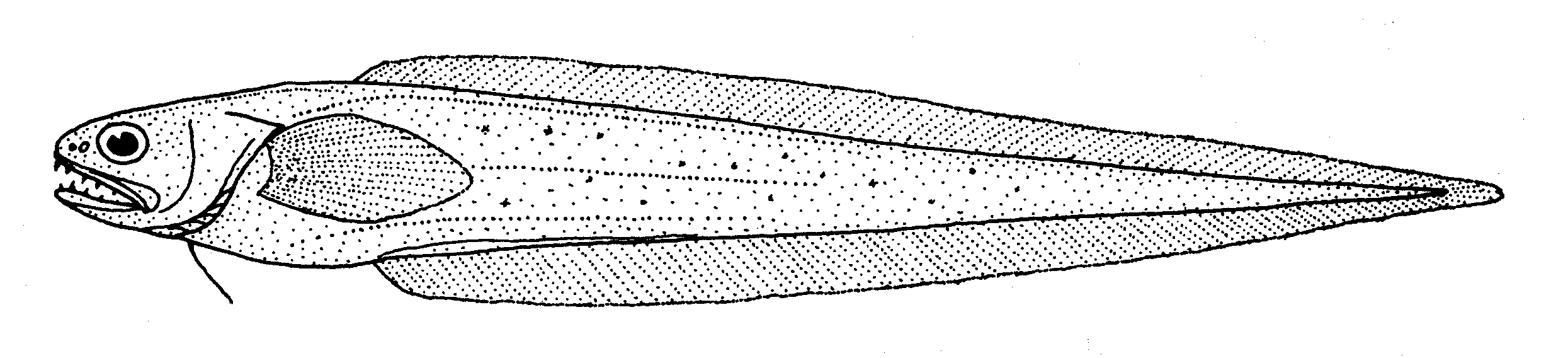
- Drawing by Dr Tony Ayling

Scientific classification
- Kingdom: Animalia
- Phylum: Chordata
- Class: Actinopterygii
- Order: Ophidiiformes
- Family: Carapidae
- Subfamily: Pyramodontinae
- Genus: Pyramodon
- Species: P. ventralis

Binomial name
- Pyramodon ventralis H. M. Smith & Radcliffe, 1913

= Pallid pearlfish =

Species of fish

The pallid pearlfish, Pyramodon ventralis, is a pearlfish of the family Carapidae, found in the Indo-western Pacific Ocean at depths between 100 and 400 m. Its length is between 25 and 30 cm.
