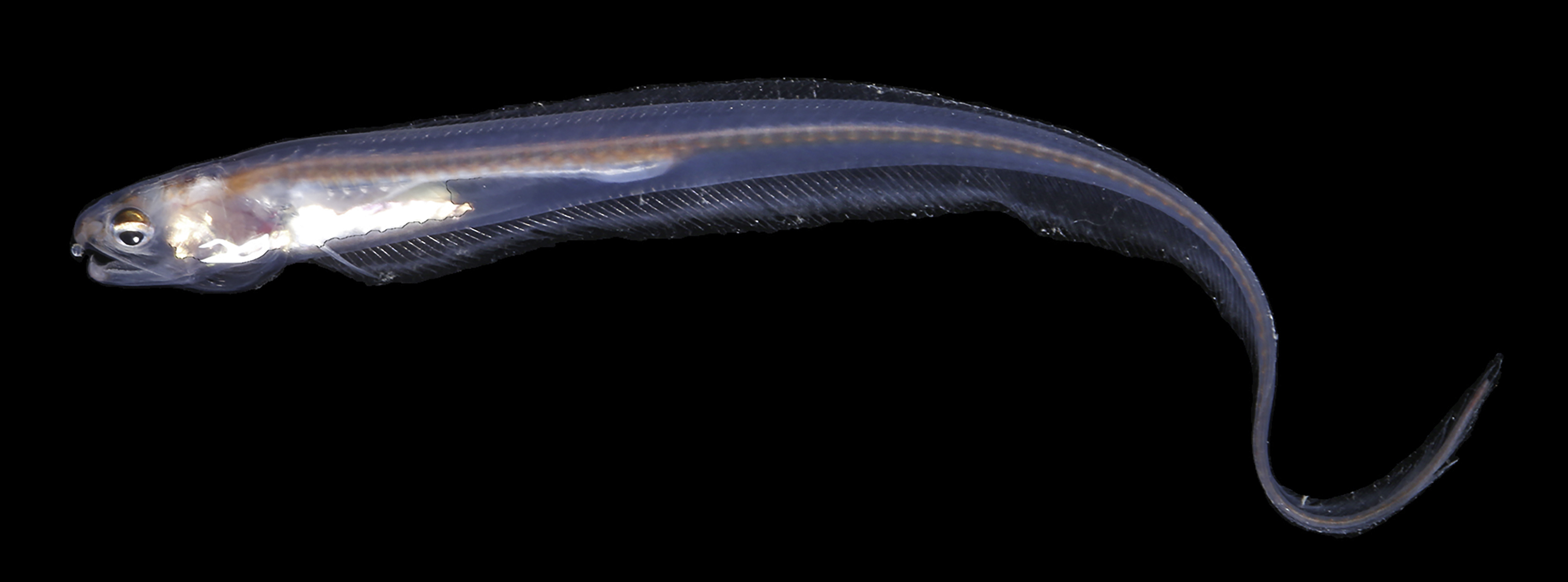

Conservation status
- Least Concern (IUCN 3.1)

Scientific classification
- Kingdom: Animalia
- Phylum: Chordata
- Class: Actinopterygii
- Order: Ophidiiformes
- Family: Carapidae
- Genus: Onuxodon
- Species: O. fowleri

Binomial name
- Onuxodon fowleri Smith

= Onuxodon fowleri =

Species of fish

Onuxodon fowleri is a species of pearlfish first described by Smith, 1955. Onuxodon fowleri is part of the genus Onuxodon and the subfamily Carapinae. No subspecies are listed in the Catalog of Life.
