= Echiodon neotes =

Conservation status
- Data Deficient (IUCN 3.1)

Scientific classification
- Kingdom: Animalia
- Phylum: Chordata
- Class: Actinopterygii
- Order: Ophidiiformes
- Family: Carapidae
- Genus: Echiodon
- Species: E. neotes

Binomial name
- Echiodon neotes Markle & Olney, 1990

Species of fish

Echiodon neotes is a species of pearlfish in the subfamily Carapinae. It is known from the Kermadec Trench (Pacific Ocean). It can grow to 23.5 cm (9.3 in) total length.
