= Echiodon anchipterus =

Conservation status
- Data Deficient (IUCN 3.1)

Scientific classification
- Kingdom: Animalia
- Phylum: Chordata
- Class: Actinopterygii
- Order: Ophidiiformes
- Family: Carapidae
- Genus: Echiodon
- Species: E. anchipterus

Binomial name
- Echiodon anchipterus Williams, 1984

Species of fish

Echiodon anchipterus, the closefin pearlfish, is a fish species described by Jeffrey T. Williams in 1984. Echiodon anchipterus is part of the genus Echiodon and the subfamily Carapinae. No subspecies are listed in the Catalog of Life.

== Range ==
The closefin pearlfish is found in the Northwest Pacific: Japan, the Western Central Pacific: Philippines, and the Southwest Pacific: Australia.
