= Thromidia seychellesensis =

Scientific classification
- Kingdom: Animalia
- Phylum: Echinodermata
- Class: Asteroidea
- Order: Valvatida
- Family: Mithrodiidae
- Genus: Thromidia
- Species: T. seychellesensis

Binomial name
- Thromidia seychellesensis Pope & Rowe, 1977

Starfish of the Mithrodiidae family

Thromidia seychellesensis is a species of starfish in the family Mithrodiidae. It occurs in Seychelles, Indian Ocean.

Thromidia seychellesensis has five cylindroid arms. The radius is at least 125 mm (4.9 in).

Fish Encheliophis homei often lives in the body cavity of Thromidia seychellesensis.
