= Star pearlfish =

Scientific classification
- Kingdom: Animalia
- Phylum: Chordata
- Class: Actinopterygii
- Division: Teleostei
- Order: Ophidiiformes
- Family: Carapidae
- Genus: Carapus
- Species: C. mourlani

Binomial name
- Carapus mourlani (Petit, 1934)

Synonyms
- Carapus mayottae Smith, 1955; Carapus pindae Smith, 1955; Carapus variegatus Fowler & Steinitz, 1956; Encheliophis mourlani (Petit, 1934); Fierasfer mourlani Petit, 1934; Oxybeles lumbricoides Bleeker, 1854 (Nomen dubium)

Species of fish

The star pearlfish, Carapus mourlani, is a species of slender, ray-finned fish in the family Carapidae. It normally lives inside a starfish or a sea cucumber.

== Description ==
The star pearlfish is a long, slim, silvery fish growing to a maximum length of 17 cm (6.7 in). It has dark-pigmented spots, known as melanophores, scattered irregularly across its translucent, scaleless body. The dorsal and anal fins run the length of the body, with the dorsal fin rays being shorter than those of the anal fin. No pelvic fins are present. The posterior part of the upper jaw has numerous pointed, cardiform teeth arranged in rows, but no large fangs or gaps occur between groups of teeth. The eyes are well developed, although these fish mainly live in darkness. The swim bladder lies below the 9th and 10th vertebrae and has two chambers. The precaudal vertebrae are 15 to 17 in number.

== Distribution ==
C. mourlani is found on reefs in the Indo-Pacific Ocean down to about 150 m (490 ft). Its range includes the coastlines of South and East Africa, the Seychelles, India, Indonesia, the Philippines, Japan, Micronesia, northern Australia, and Hawaii.

== Biology ==
The star pearlfish is a commensal of starfishes such as Culcita novaeguineae and holothurians such as Bohadschia argus and Stichopus spp. It spends most of its time in the coelomic cavity of its host, emerging, usually at night, to feed. Some species of Carapus feed on small crustaceans, other carapid fish, and possibly, polychaete worms.

This species is usually found singly in its host, or sometimes as a male and female pair. The fish works its way in through the anus of the sea cucumber. When it is living in a starfish, it enters its host through the grooves associated with the tube feet; using them as guides to find the host mouth, which it uses as an entry into the body cavity. A pair of fish may release their gametes within the body cavity of the host, and the fertilised eggs may later emerge into the water column. A study designed to discover whether there were genetic differences between the pearlfish living in holothurians and those living in starfish was inconclusive. During the experimental work, a large sea cucumber, Bohadschia argus, was put in a bucket of relatively cold water, which caused 14 pearlfish to emerge, with a further one remaining inside. This is believed to be the record number of carapid fish ever found in a single holothurian.
