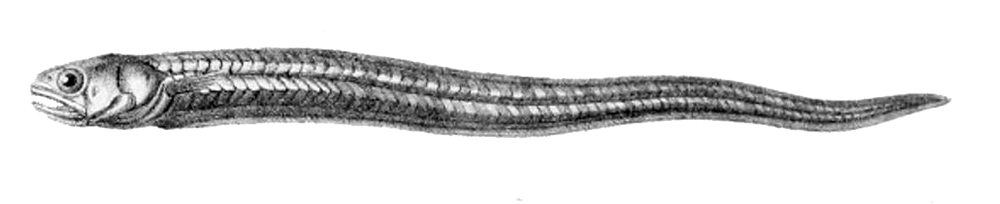
- Silver pearlfish

Conservation status
- Least Concern (IUCN 3.1)

Scientific classification
- Kingdom: Animalia
- Phylum: Chordata
- Class: Actinopterygii
- Order: Ophidiiformes
- Family: Carapidae
- Genus: Encheliophis
- Species: E. homei

Binomial name
- Encheliophis homei (Richardson, 1846)

Synonyms
- Carapus homei (Richardson, 1846); Carapus neglectus (Peters, 1855); Fierasfer affinis Günther, 1862; Fierasfer brandesu (Bleeker, 1851); Fierasfer homei (Richardson, 1846); Fierasfer neglectum Peters, 1855; Oxybeles brandesii Bleeker, 1851; Oxybeles homei Richardson, 1846

= Silver pearlfish =

Species of fish

The silver pearlfish, Encheliophis homei, is a species of eel-like fish in the family Carapidae. This pearlfish lives inside the coelom of sea cucumbers such as Bohadschia argus, Thelenota ananas , and Stichopus chloronotus. It is native to tropical and subtropical parts of the Indo-Pacific Ocean.

== Description ==
Encheliophis homei is a slender fish that grows to a maximum length of 19 cm (7.5 in). The body is transparent and melanophores and silvery patches are found on the abdomen, which contains a large swim bladder. It has a free and moveable upper jaw, small conical teeth, large eyes, and 116 to 128 vertebrae. The elongated dorsal fin has 33 to 38 soft rays and the anal fin 53 to 61. A pair of pectoral fins but no pelvic fins are present.

== Biology ==
As an adult, E. homei lives inside the body cavity of a sea cucumber. It enters and leaves the coelom through the anus, sometimes continues into the respiratory tree, and in one instance was found in the gut. Not much is known about the lifecycle of the fish, but it has a planktonic larval stage. Later, this larva settles on the seabed and searches for a sea cucumber host, in which it undergoes metamorphosis into a juvenile fish. Some competition among Encheliophis homei and another closely related fish Carapus boraborensis occurs for "ownership" of the host sea cucumber, and juveniles of E. homei have been found among the stomach contents of C. boraborensis. Aggression usually takes the form of tail biting.

After being in open water, the fish does not necessarily return to the original host, and shows no preference as to which species of sea cucumber it uses as a host. Before entering, it patrols several times along the outside surface of the sea cucumber, "sniffing" at it. It then pecks or taps with its snout around the area of the anus before entering the host, which it usually does head first, but sometimes the other way round.

At one time, the silver pearlfish was thought to be parasitic on its sea cucumber host, but examination of its stomach contents has shown that amphipods, shrimp, and small fishes are included in its diet, which shows it must exit its host, probably at night, to forage.

== Distribution ==
The silver pearlfish is native to the Indo-Pacific Ocean. Its range extends from the Red Sea and the East African coast to the Society Islands, Taiwan, and northern and eastern Australia, probably southwards as far as Tasmania. It occurs to depths of 30 m (98 ft).

== Etymology ==
The specific name honours the English surgeon and naturalist Everard Home (1756-1832) who collected along the coasts of Australia and China and who may have collected the type of this species.
