= Encheliophis chardewalli =

Conservation status
- Data Deficient (IUCN 3.1)

Scientific classification
- Kingdom: Animalia
- Phylum: Chordata
- Class: Actinopterygii
- Order: Ophidiiformes
- Family: Carapidae
- Genus: Encheliophis
- Species: E. chardewalli

Binomial name
- Encheliophis chardewalli Parmentier, 2004

Species of fish

Encheliophis chardewalli is a species of fish described by Parmentier in 2004. Encheliophis chardewalli is part of the genus Encheliophis and the Carapidae family.
