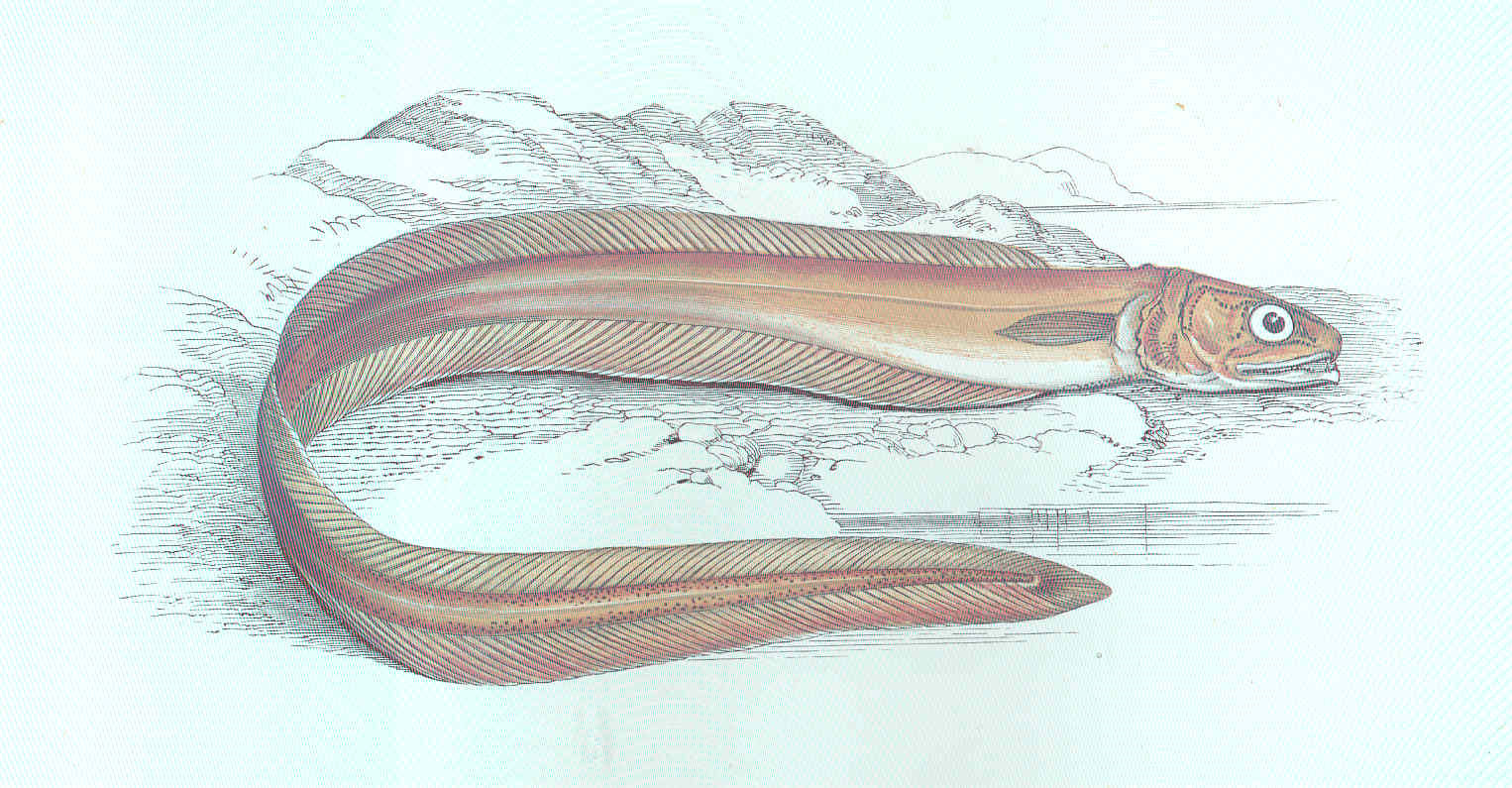
- Drawing from A History of the Fishes of the British Islands (1877)

Conservation status
- Least Concern (IUCN 3.1)

Scientific classification
- Kingdom: Animalia
- Phylum: Chordata
- Class: Actinopterygii
- Order: Ophidiiformes
- Family: Carapidae
- Genus: Echiodon
- Species: E. drummondii

Binomial name
- Echiodon drummondii (Thompson, 1837)

Synonyms
- Echiodon drummondi Thompson, 1837

= Echiodon drummondii =

Species of fish

Echiodon drummondii, sometimes called Drummond's echiodon or Drummond's pearlfish, and in Ireland simply called the pearlfish, is a species of fish in the family Carapidae (pearlfish).

It is named for James Lawson Drummond, who collected the holotype at Carnlough, Ireland in 1836.

== Description ==
Echiodon drummondii is reddish in colour with a silvery abdomen, operculum and iris and dark markings on the head. It has an eel-like body, up to 30 cm (1 ft) in length, making it among the largest of the family. Its eyes are large, and lateral line is very faint.

== Habitat ==
Echiodon drummondii is bathydemersal, living at depths of 52–403 m (171–1,322 ft) in the North Sea and the waters surrounding Great Britain and Ireland; it has also been recorded off Iceland and the Azores.

== Behaviour ==
Echiodon drummondii can be free-living and feeds on small invertebrates, fish and bottom-dwellers. It is also known to live inside sea cucumbers; the cucumber opens its anus to breathe in, and the pearlfish swims in. Eggs have been discovered in the seabed off County Kerry.
