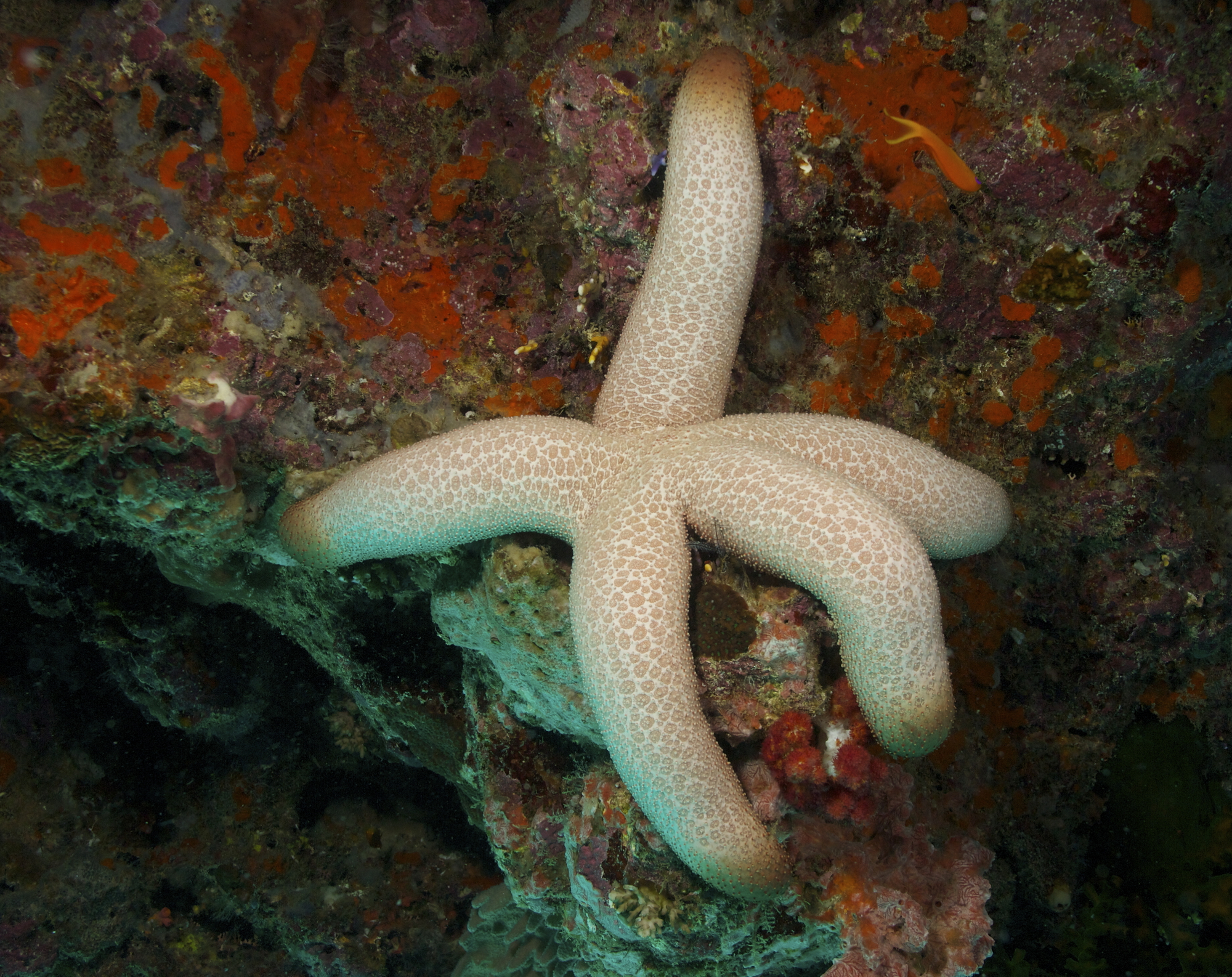

Scientific classification
- Kingdom: Animalia
- Phylum: Echinodermata
- Class: Asteroidea
- Order: Valvatida
- Family: Mithrodiidae
- Genus: Thromidia
- Species: T. catalai

Binomial name
- Thromidia catalai Pope & Rowe, 1977

= Thromidia catalai =

Heavy starfish

Species of starfish

Thromidia catalai, sometimes called the heavy starfish, is a species of starfish in the family Mithrodiidae in the order Valvatida. It is native to the Indo-Pacific region. Thromidia catalai is one of the largest and heaviest starfishes in the world. It is reported to weigh as much as 6 kg (13 lb) and have a diameter of 60 to 65 cm (24 to 26 in). This species was first described by the Australian biologists E. C. Pope and F. W. E. Rowe in 1977, the type locality being New Caledonia.

== Description ==
Thromidia catalai is a large starfish with five arms and a diameter of up to 70 cm (28 in), weighing up to 6 kg (13 lb). The surface is covered with low tubercles, giving it a granular appearance. The arms are robust and cylindrical, not tapering much and having rounded tips. The disc is small, and both disc and arms are a pinkish-beige colour, apart from the tips of the arms, which are a dark orange-brown. In contrast to other members of the genus Thromidia, the tips of the arms have small, widely spaced tubercles. The only other starfish with which this species could be confused is the closely related Thromidia gigas, but that species, though a similar size, has paler arm tips and is only found in the southern Indian Ocean, around Madagascar, Réunion and South Africa.

== Distribution and habitat ==
Thromidia catalai is found in the tropical Indo-Pacific region, its range extending from Indonesia to Hawaii, and from southern Japan to New Caledonia and northern Australia. It is found typically in and between reefs in the places where detritus settles, at depths between about 15 and 130 m (50 and 430 ft), but usually deeper than 30 m (100 ft) on the continental shelf. Although seldom encountered, this may be because of the considerable depth at which it lives rather than its rarity.

== Ecology ==
Little is known of the feeding habits of this starfish, but related species are carnivorous with a diet mainly consisting of molluscs and echinoderms. The starfish everts its stomach to blanket the prey, secretes enzymes and digests it. As with other starfishes, the sexes are separate and the eggs and sperm are liberated into the water column where fertilization takes place.
