= Thromidia brycei =

Scientific classification
- Kingdom: Animalia
- Phylum: Echinodermata
- Class: Asteroidea
- Order: Valvatida
- Family: Mithrodiidae
- Genus: Thromidia
- Species: T. brycei

Binomial name
- Thromidia brycei Marsh, 2009

Species of starfish

Thromidia brycei, the thick-armed seastar, is a large, obese species of starfish in the family Mithrodiidae. It is native to the North Western Australia region and was described in 2009.

== Description ==
Thromidia brycei is a large, obese starfish with a relatively small disc and five slightly tapering thick arms. The body is covered by thick pink, cream to light brown blotches on the skin which can sometimes be completely brown. The skeleton is covered in thick skin which is composed of small plates which are linked by radiating trabeculae. The tubercles are covered by rounded polygonal granules and small pointed almost scale like granules on the side. The tubercles continue at the same size to the ends of the arms.

== Habitat and distribution ==
Thromidia brycei is found in the North Western Australia region. It is usually found on sandy shallows, mud, or rock typically with red and brown algae or encrusting organisms, often times with sponges, gorgonians, and alcyonacea at depths of 15-150 metres.
