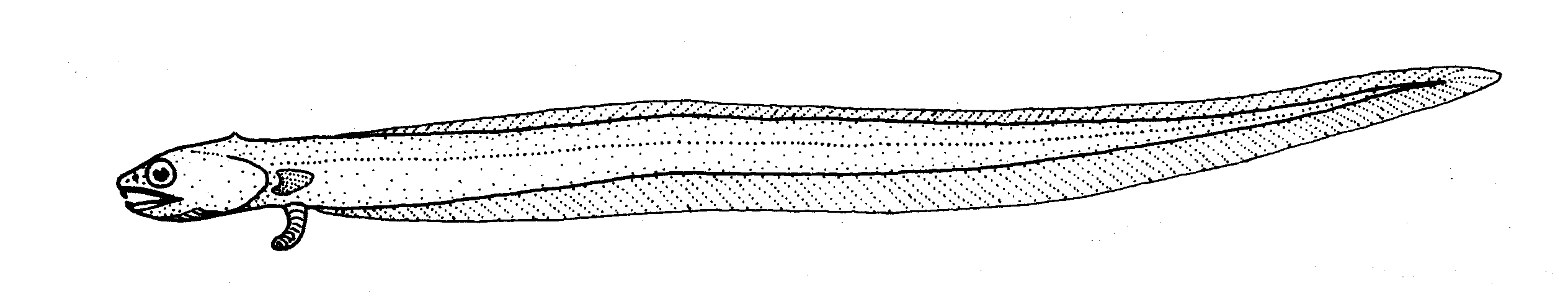
- Drawing by Dr Tony Ayling

Conservation status
- Least Concern (IUCN 3.1)

Scientific classification
- Kingdom: Animalia
- Phylum: Chordata
- Class: Actinopterygii
- Order: Ophidiiformes
- Family: Carapidae
- Genus: Echiodon
- Species: E. rendahli

Binomial name
- Echiodon rendahli (Whitley, 1941)

Synonyms
- Carapus rendahli Whitley, 1941

= Rendahl's messmate =

Species of fish

Rendahl's messmate (Echiodon rendahli) is a pearlfish of the family Carapidae, found in the southwest Pacific Ocean around Australia and New Zealand at depths to 60 metres (200 ft). Its length is between 10 and 12 centimetres (3.9 and 4.7 in).The larvae has a long filament on its head which bears some resemblance to a siphonophore. These fish live within sponges. The specific name honours the Swedish naturalist and artist Hialmar Rendahl who collected the specimens in the Tasman Sea which were used by Gilbert Percy Whitley to describe this species.

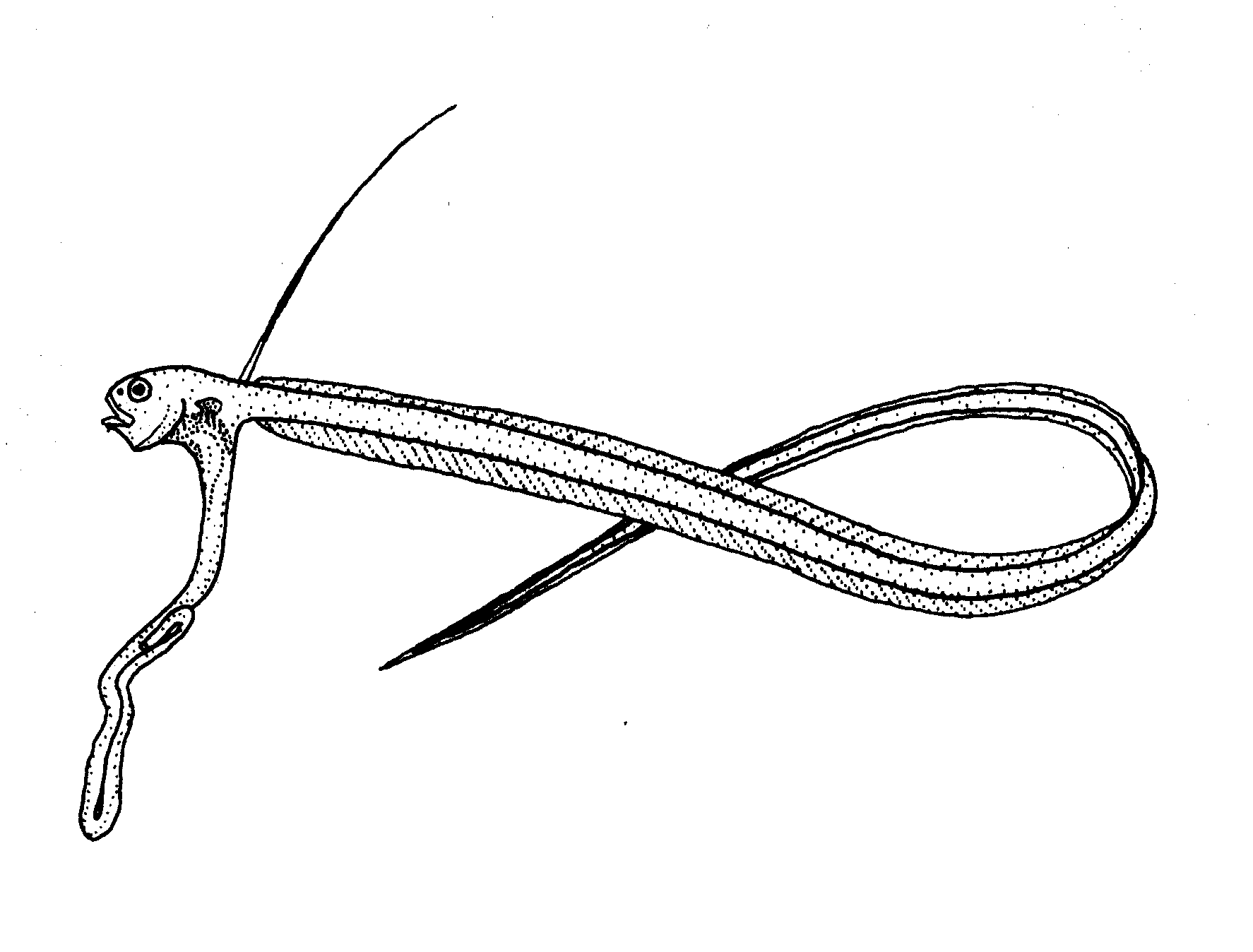
Juvenile Echiodon rendahli Drawing by Dr Tony Ayling
