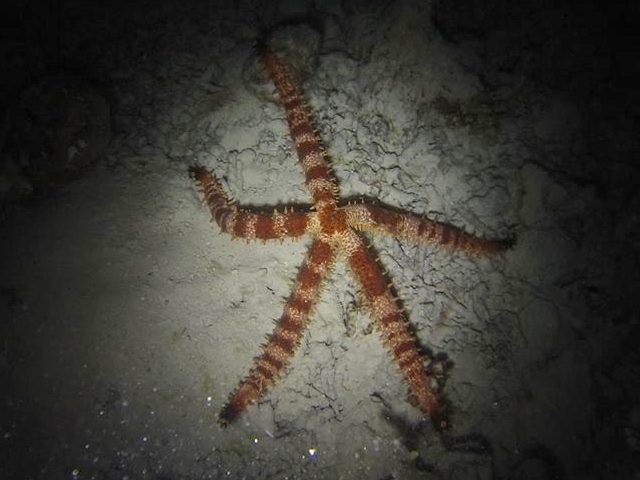
- Mithrodia clavigera in the Maldives

Scientific classification
- Kingdom: Animalia
- Phylum: Echinodermata
- Class: Asteroidea
- Order: Valvatida
- Family: Mithrodiidae
- Genus: Mithrodia; Gray, 1840

= Mithrodia =

Genus of starfishes

The Mithrodia is a genus of starfish in the family Mithrodiidae.

== List of species ==
- Mithrodia bradleyi Verrill, 1870 -- East Pacific
- Mithrodia clavigera (Lamarck, 1816) -- Circumtropical
- Mithrodia fisheri Holly, 1932 -- Hawaii.
- Mithrodia bailleui Perrier (MS) in Engel, John & Cherbonnier, 1948 (nomen nudum)
- Mithrodia victoriae—Former name of Mithrodia clavigera for the Atlantic Ocean.

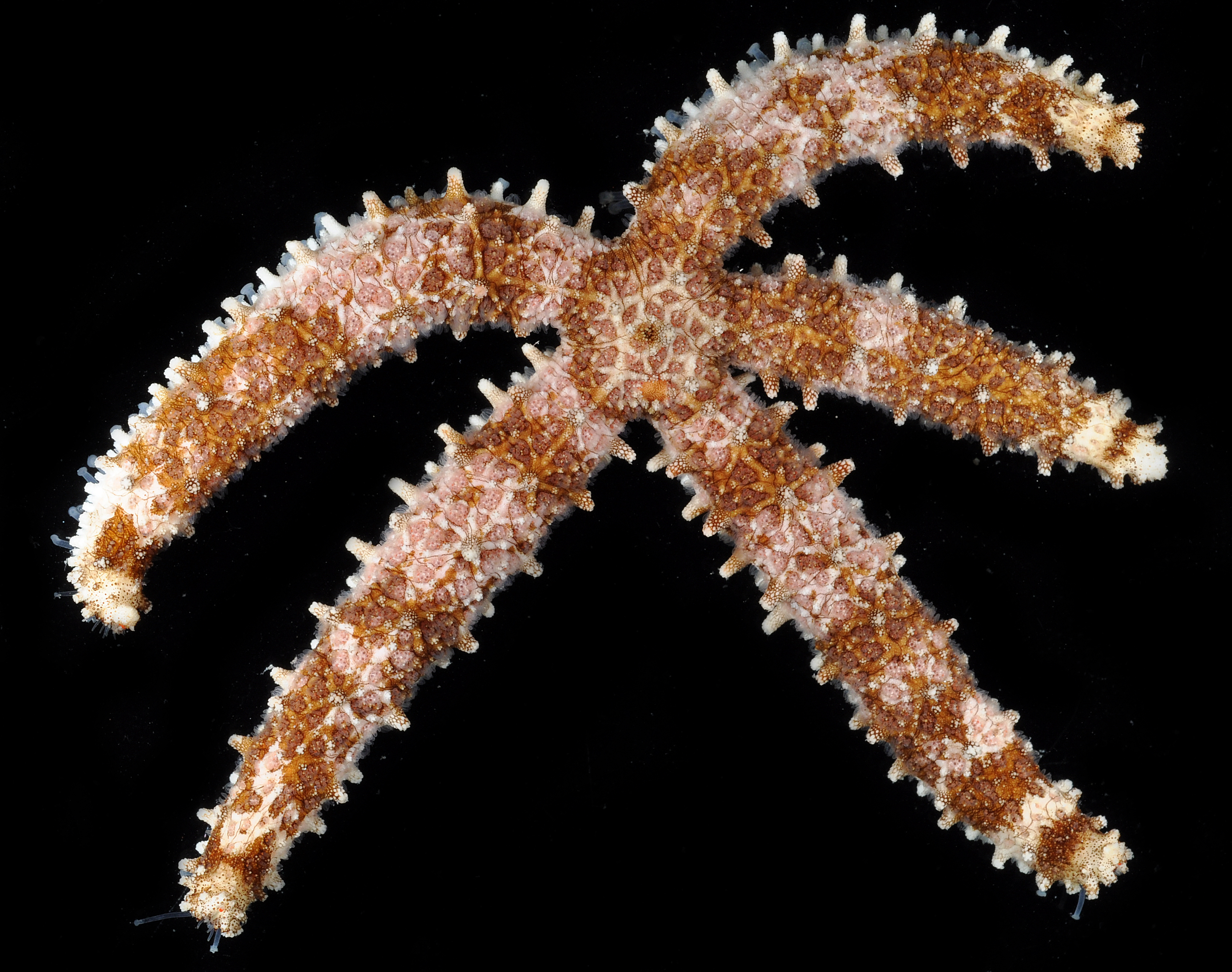
Mithrodia clavigera
