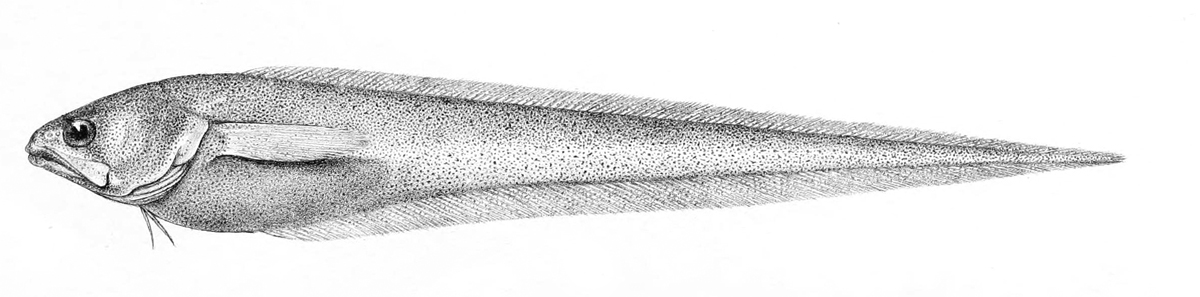
- Dogtooth pearlfish (P. punctatus)
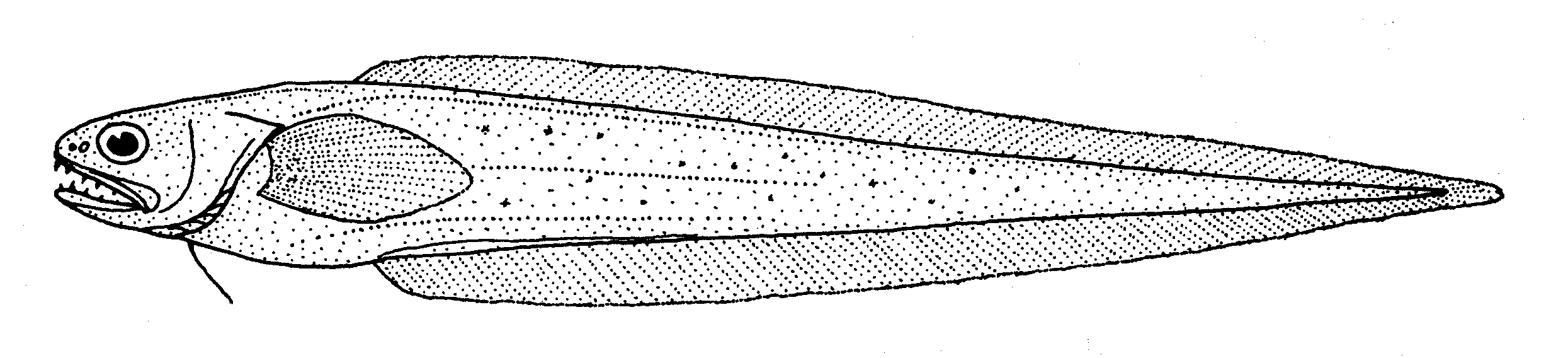
- Pallid pearlfish (P. ventralis)

Scientific classification
- Kingdom: Animalia
- Phylum: Chordata
- Class: Actinopterygii
- Order: Ophidiiformes
- Family: Carapidae
- Subfamily: Pyramodontinae
- Genus: Pyramodon; H. M. Smith & Radcliffe, 1913

Type species
- Pyramodon ventralis H. M. Smith & Radcliffe, 1913

Synonyms
- Cynophidium Regan, 1914

= Pyramodon =

Genus of fishes

Pyramodon is a genus of pearlfishes, with these currently recognized species:

- Pyramodon lindas Markle & Olney, 1990 (blackedge pearlfish)
- Pyramodon parini Markle & Olney, 1990
- Pyramodon punctatus (Regan, 1914) (dogtooth pearlfish)
- Pyramodon ventralis H. M. Smith & Radcliffe, 1913 (pallid pearlfish)
