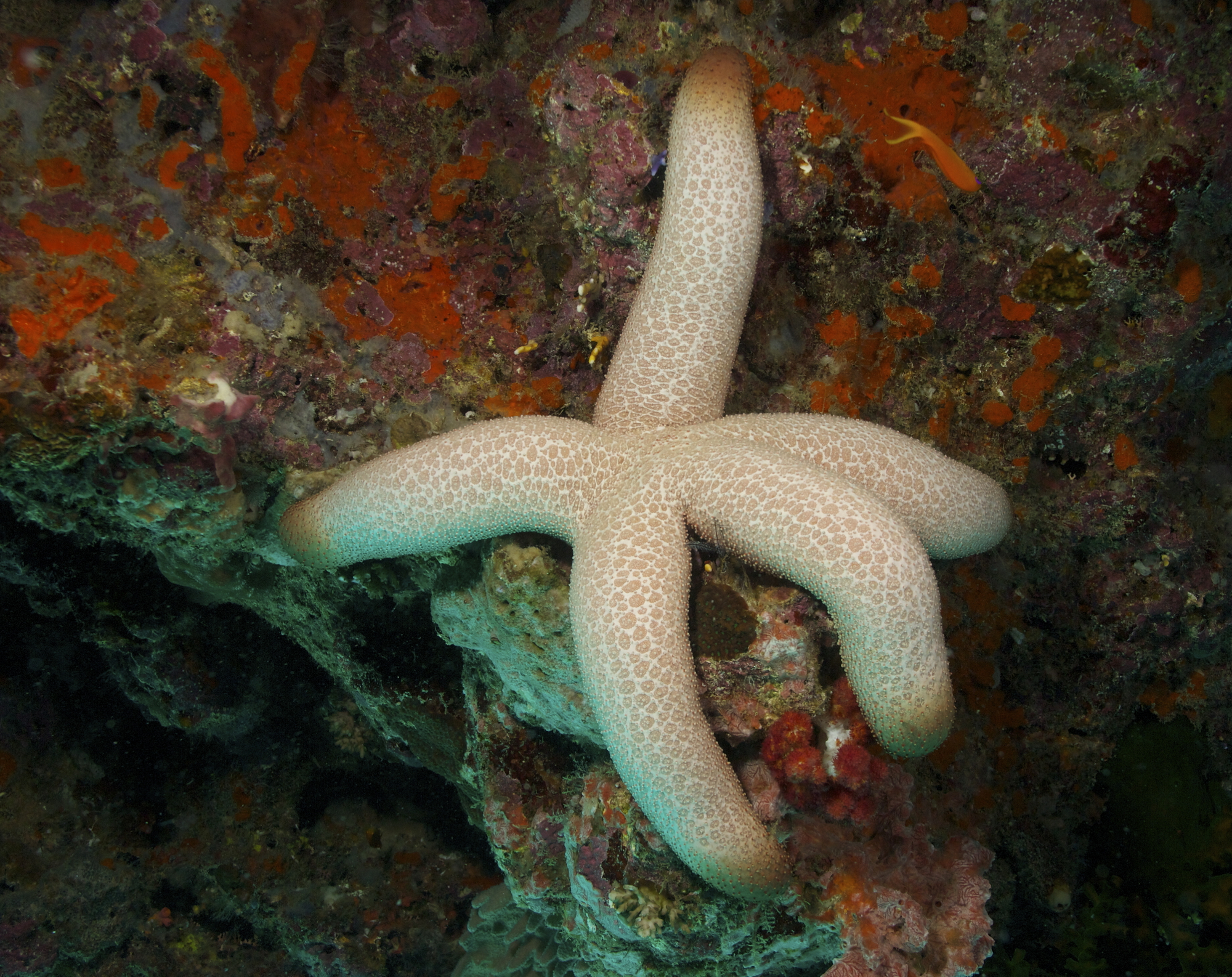
- Thromidia catalai

Scientific classification
- Kingdom: Animalia
- Phylum: Echinodermata
- Class: Asteroidea
- Order: Valvatida
- Family: Mithrodiidae
- Genus: Thromidia; Pope & Rowe, 1977

Species
- 4 species (see text)

= Thromidia =

Genus of starfishes

Thromidia is a genus of starfish in the family Mithrodiidae.

== Description and characteristics ==
These are unusually massive sea stars with five sausage-shaped arms, containing probably the heaviest species of Asteroidea, up to 6 kg.

== Species ==
There are four recognized species according to World Register of Marine Species:

- Thromidia brycei Marsh, 2009 – Western Australia
- Thromidia catalai Pope & Rowe, 1977 – West Pacific
- Thromidia gigas (Mortensen, 1935) – South-west Indian ocean
- Thromidia seychellesensis Pope & Rowe, 1977 – Seychelles
