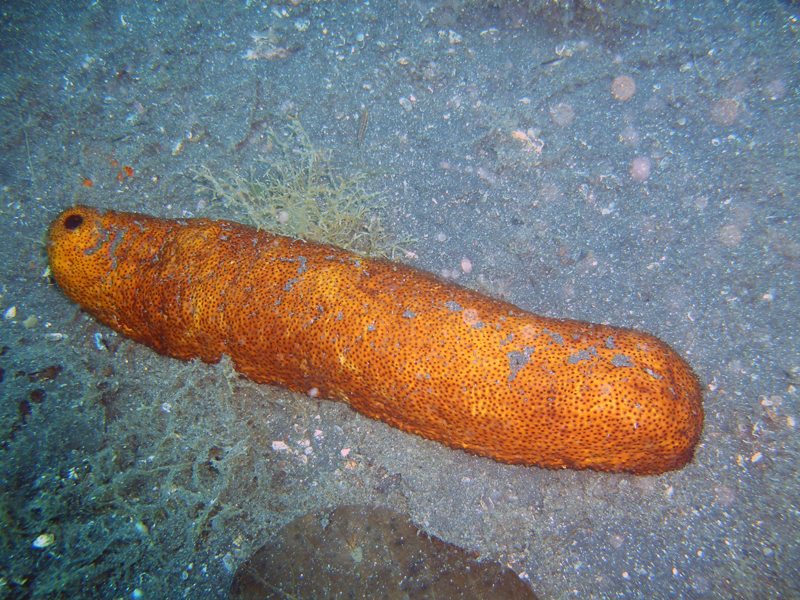

Conservation status
- Data Deficient (IUCN 3.1)

Scientific classification
- Kingdom: Animalia
- Phylum: Echinodermata
- Class: Holothuroidea
- Order: Holothuriida
- Family: Holothuriidae
- Genus: Bohadschia
- Species: B. marmorata

Binomial name
- Bohadschia marmorata Jaeger, 1833

Synonyms
- Holothuria marmorata Jaeger, 1833; Holothuria utrimquestigmosa Haacke, 1880; Sporadipus (Colpochirota) ualanensis Brandt, 1835

= Bohadschia marmorata =

Species of sea cucumber

Bohadschia marmorata, commonly known as the brown sandfish or chalky cucumber, is a species of sea cucumber in the family Holothuriidae. It lives on the seabed in shallow waters in the Indo-Pacific region.

== Description ==
Bohadschia marmorata is cylindrical in shape and grows to about 35 centimetres (14 in) long. The body wall is tough and leathery and has a rough texture due to the calcareous spicules it contains. It is covered in translucent papillae up to 1 centimetre (0.39 in) across and a few short spines. The anterior end of the body is somewhat narrowed and has a mouth surrounded by a ring of retractile tentacles. The posterior end is rounded and has an anal opening. Adjoining this is the cloaca through which defensive white sticky threads, the cuvierian tubules, may be ejected when the animal is stressed. The cloaca is also connected to the respiratory tree, into and out of which water is pumped for gas exchange. The body colour is cream or orange partially obscured by variable numbers of dark brown speckles and blotches. On the underside is a wide pale-coloured longitudinal stripe and many short, slender tube feet with knobbly tips.

== Distribution and habitat ==
Bohadschia marmorata is found in the Indo-Pacific Ocean. The range extends from the Red Sea and east coast of Africa to Japan, the Philippines and Australia. It lives on the sandy or gravelly bottoms of shallow water areas and seagrass meadows at depths down to about 36 metres (118 ft). It is often semi-submerged in the sand.

== Biology ==
Bohadschia marmorata is a detritivore. It uses its tube feet to move around and scoops sand, mud and debris into its mouth with its oral tentacles. Having processed this material in its gut, it voids the remains, leaving a characteristic trail of sand on the seabed.
