= Onuxodon =

Scientific classification
- Kingdom: Animalia
- Phylum: Chordata
- Class: Actinopterygii
- Order: Ophidiiformes
- Family: Carapidae
- Subfamily: Carapinae
- Genus: Onuxodon; J. L. B. Smith, 1955

Type species
- Carapus parvibrachium Fowler, 1927

Genus of fishes

Onuxodon is an Indo-Pacific genus of pearlfishes from the family Carapidae. The generic name is derived from the Greek onyx meaning "claw" and odon meaning "tooth", referring to the sharp fang like teeth of Onuxodon parvibrachium. Species in this genus are distributed from South Africa to Hawaii. They live commensally with molluscs. The three currently recognized species are:

- Onuxodon fowleri (J. L. B. Smith, 1955) (Fowler's pearlfish)
- Onuxodon margaritiferae (Rendahl, 1921) (bivalve pearlfish)
- Onuxodon parvibrachium (Fowler, 1927) (oyster pearlfish)
