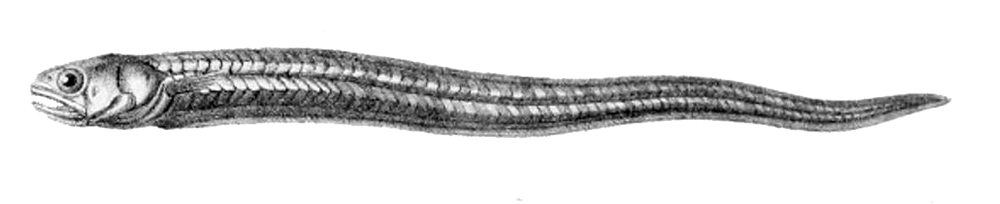
- Encheliophis homei

Scientific classification
- Kingdom: Animalia
- Phylum: Chordata
- Class: Actinopterygii
- Order: Ophidiiformes
- Family: Carapidae
- Subfamily: Carapinae
- Genus: Encheliophis; J. P. Müller, 1842

Type species
- Encheliophis vermicularis Müller, 1842

= Encheliophis =

Genus of fishes

Encheliophis is a genus of pearlfishes, with seven currently recognized species:

- Encheliophis boraborensis (Kaup, 1856) (pinhead pearlfish)
- Encheliophis chardewalli Parmentier, 2004
- Encheliophis gracilis (Bleeker, 1856) (graceful pearlfish)
- Encheliophis homei (J. Richardson, 1846) (silver pearlfish)
- Encheliophis sagamianus (S. Tanaka (I), 1908)
- Encheliophis vermicularis J. P. Müller, 1842 (worm pearlfish)
- Encheliophis vermiops Markle & Olney, 1990 (pygmy pearlfish)
