= Tetragondacnus spilotus =

Conservation status
- Data Deficient (IUCN 3.1)

Scientific classification
- Kingdom: Animalia
- Phylum: Chordata
- Class: Actinopterygii
- Order: Ophidiiformes
- Family: Carapidae
- Subfamily: Tetragondacninae; M. E. Anderson & Satria, 2007
- Genus: Tetragondacnus; M. E. Anderson & Satria, 2007
- Species: T. spilotus

Binomial name
- Tetragondacnus spilotus M. E. Anderson & Satria, 2007

Species of fish

Tetragondacnus spilotus is a species of pearlfish found in the Pacific waters off of Sumatra where it has been recovered at a depth of just over 500 metres (1,600 ft). This species is the only known member of its genus.
