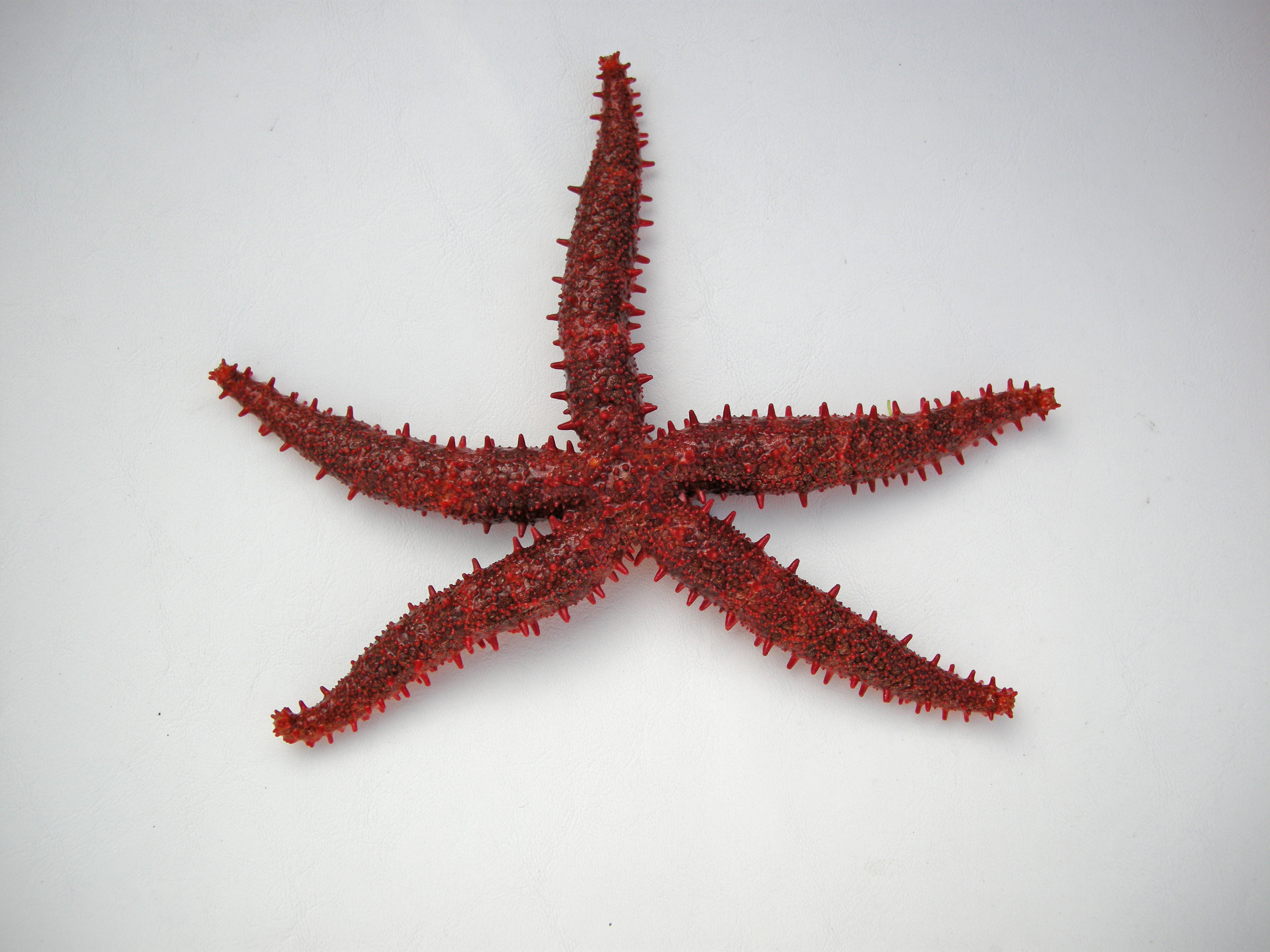
- Mithrodia bradleyi
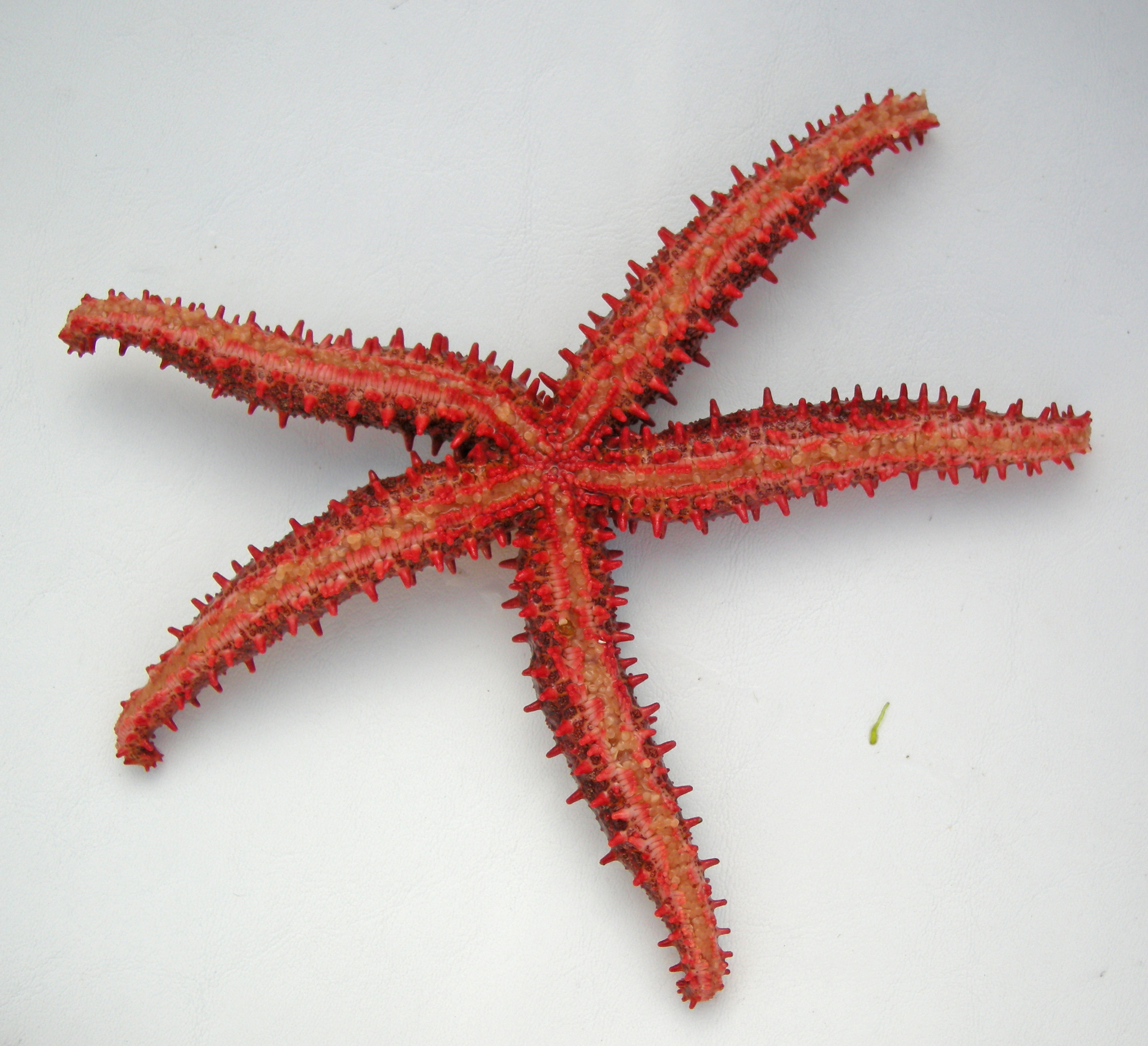
- Mithrodia bradleyi underside

Scientific classification
- Kingdom: Animalia
- Phylum: Echinodermata
- Class: Asteroidea
- Order: Valvatida
- Family: Mithrodiidae
- Genus: Mithrodia
- Species: M. bradleyi

Binomial name
- Mithrodia bradleyi (Verrill, 1870)

Synonyms
- Mithrodia enriquecasoi Caso, 1976

= Mithrodia bradleyi =

Species of starfish

Mithrodia bradleyi, known as Bradley's sea star, is a species of sea star. It was first described to science by Addison Emory Verrill in 1870. It was named after Frank Howe Bradley, who collected, in Panama, the type specimen described by Verrill.

== Description ==
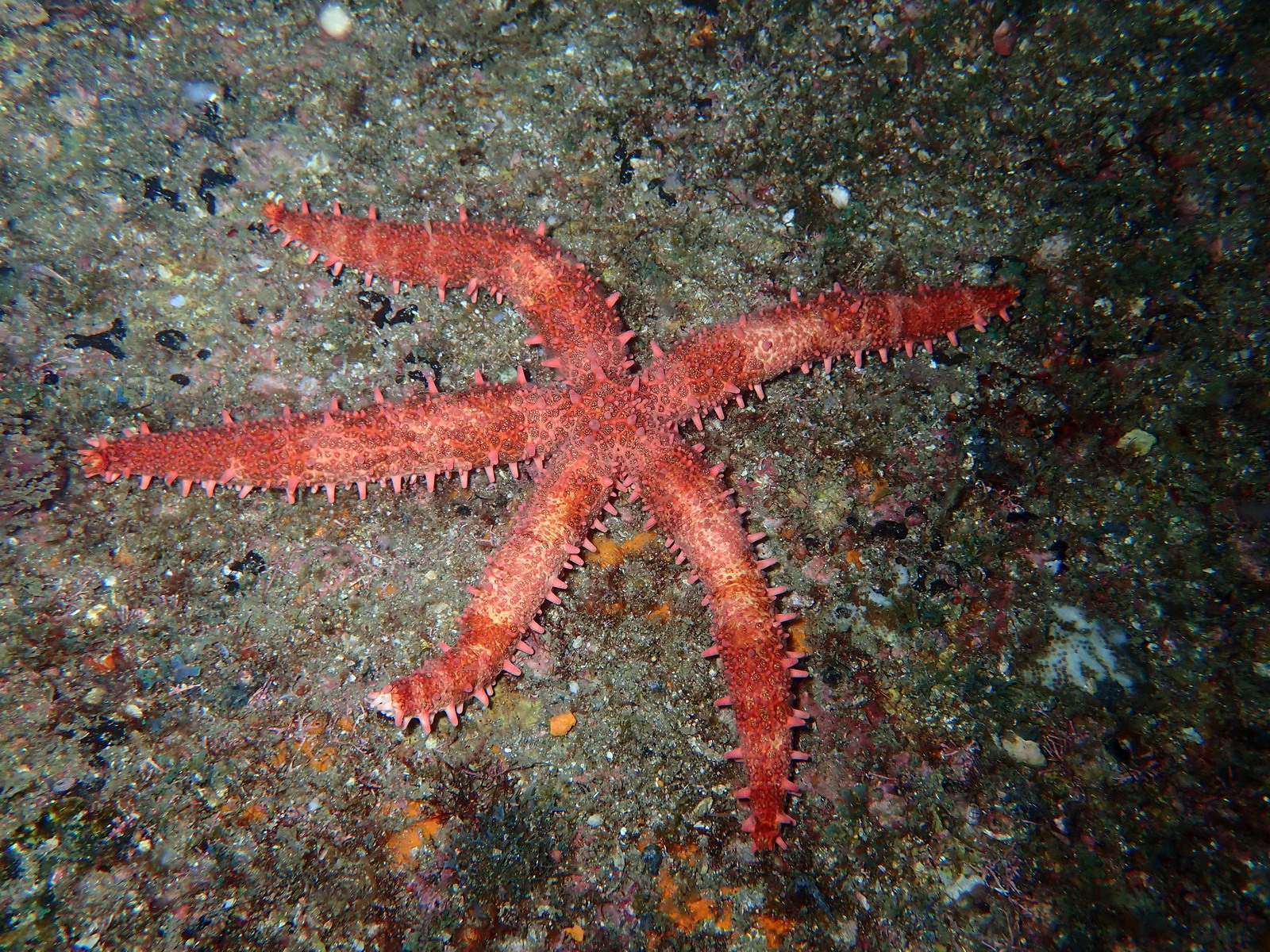
Mithrodia bradleyi in the Gulf of California

Bradley's sea star has five arms that are banded in lighter and darker shades of red or red-brown. The disk is small. The arms are covered with many small bumps and fewer, more prominent spines. The spines are arranged in rows, including a row that runs right along the top of each arm, and typically two more rows that run the length of the arms on either side. The arms are rounded, almost circular in cross-section. The sea star can obtain a diameter of 20 centimetres (7.9 in).

== Distribution ==
Bradley's sea star lives in the eastern Pacific Ocean from Mexico to Chile, including the Gulf of California. It is also found in the Galapagos Islands. It lives on rocky bottoms and coral reefs from the intertidal zone to 50 metres (160 ft) deep. This animal lives in a water temperature band from 19.74 °C (67.53 °F) to 24.327 °C (75.789 °F). This temperature range is cooler than a typical tropical fish tank, so this sea star is not collected for the aquarium trade.
