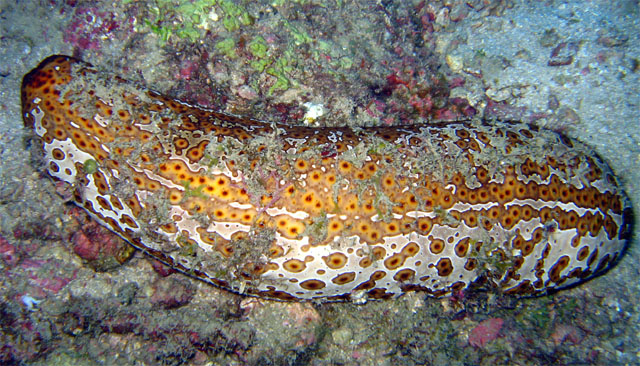
- Bohadschia argus

Scientific classification
- Kingdom: Animalia
- Phylum: Echinodermata
- Class: Holothuroidea
- Order: Holothuriida
- Family: Holothuriidae
- Genus: Bohadschia; Jaeger, 1833

Type species
- Bohadschia marmorata Jaeger, 1833

Species
- 12–14 species (see text)

Synonyms
- Colpochirota Brandt, 1835; Holothuria (Bohadschia); Perseis Gistel, 1848; Persites Gistel, 1848; Sporadipus Brandt, 1835

= Bohadschia =

Genus of sea cucumbers

Bohadschia is a genus of sea cucumbers in the family Holothuriidae. They are among the largest, most common, and conspicuous sea cucumbers on coral reefs. They have large, loaf-like bodies that are often strikingly colored.

== Species ==
As of 2024, the World Register of Marine Species recognizes 12 species in the genus Bohadschia:

- Bohadschia argus (Jaeger, 1833)
- Bohadschia atra (Massin, Rasolofonirina, Conand & Samyn, 1999)
- Bohadschia cousteaui (Cherbonnier, 1954)
- Bohadschia koellikeri (Semper, 1868)
- Bohadschia maculisparsa (Cherbonnier & Féral, 1984)
- Bohadschia marmorata (Jaeger, 1833)
- Bohadschia mitsioensis (Cherbonnier, 1988)
- Bohadschia ocellata (Jaeger, 1833)
- Bohadschia paradoxa (Selenka, 1867)
- Bohadschia steinitzi (Cherbonnier, 1963)
- Bohadschia subrubra (Quoy & Gaimard, 1834)
- Bohadschia vitiensis (Semper, 1868)

In addition, two undescribed species are known:

- Bohadschia sp. 1 – Known from Bali, Okinawa Island, the Philippines, and Hawaii.
- Bohadschia sp. 2 – Known only from a single tissue sample from the Red Sea; may be synonymous with Bohadschia steinitzi.
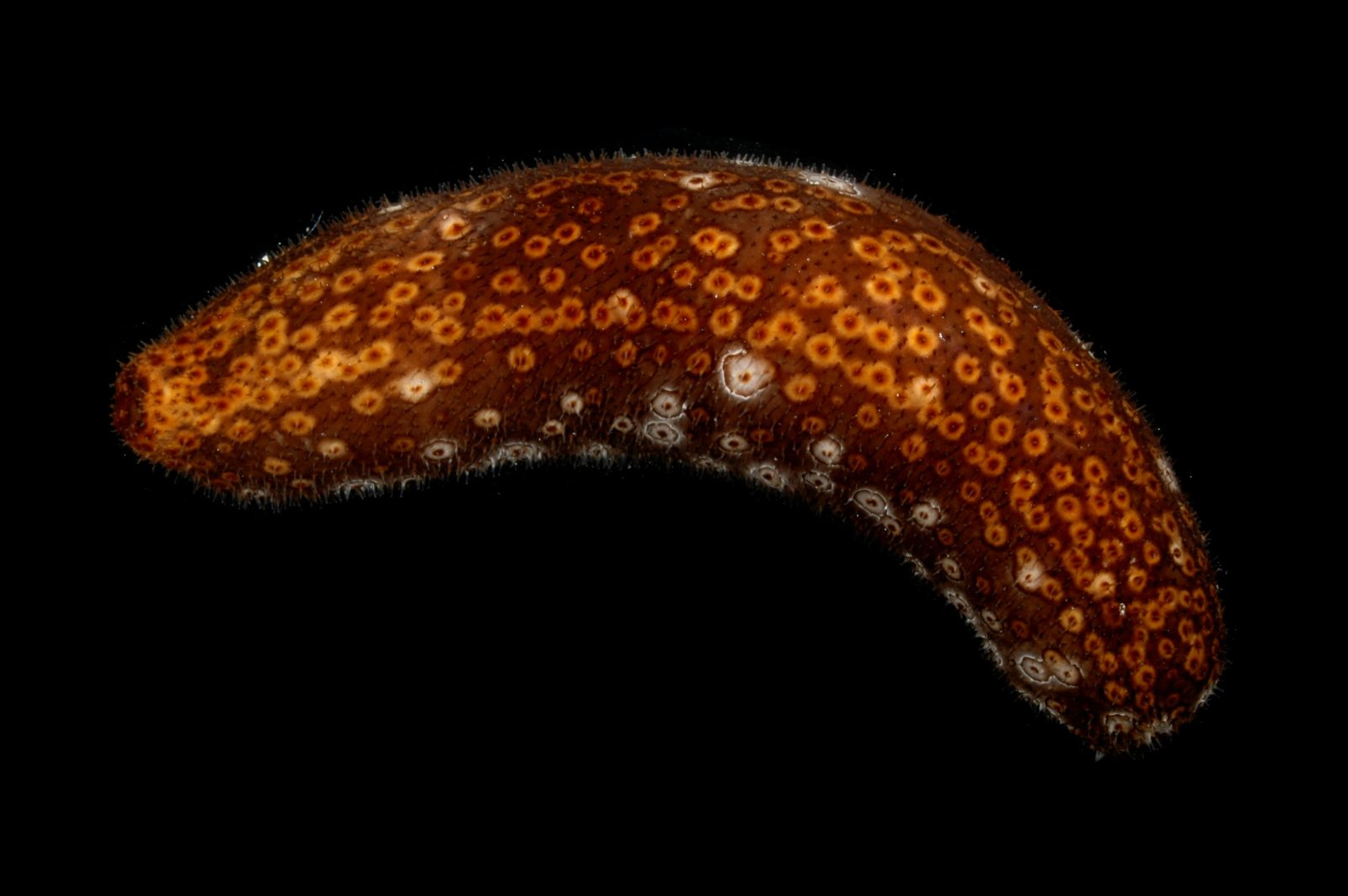
Bohadschia argus

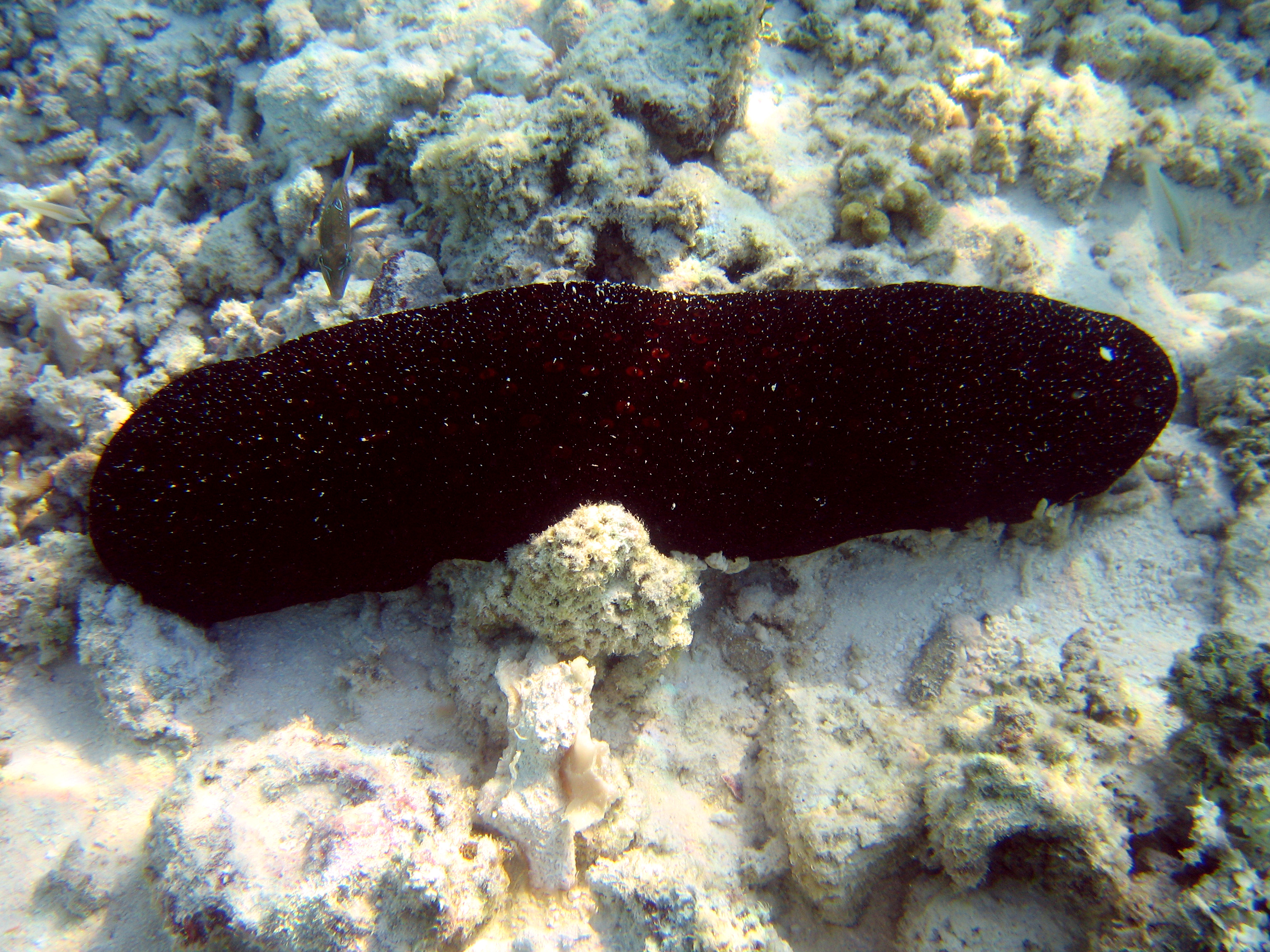
Bohadschia atra

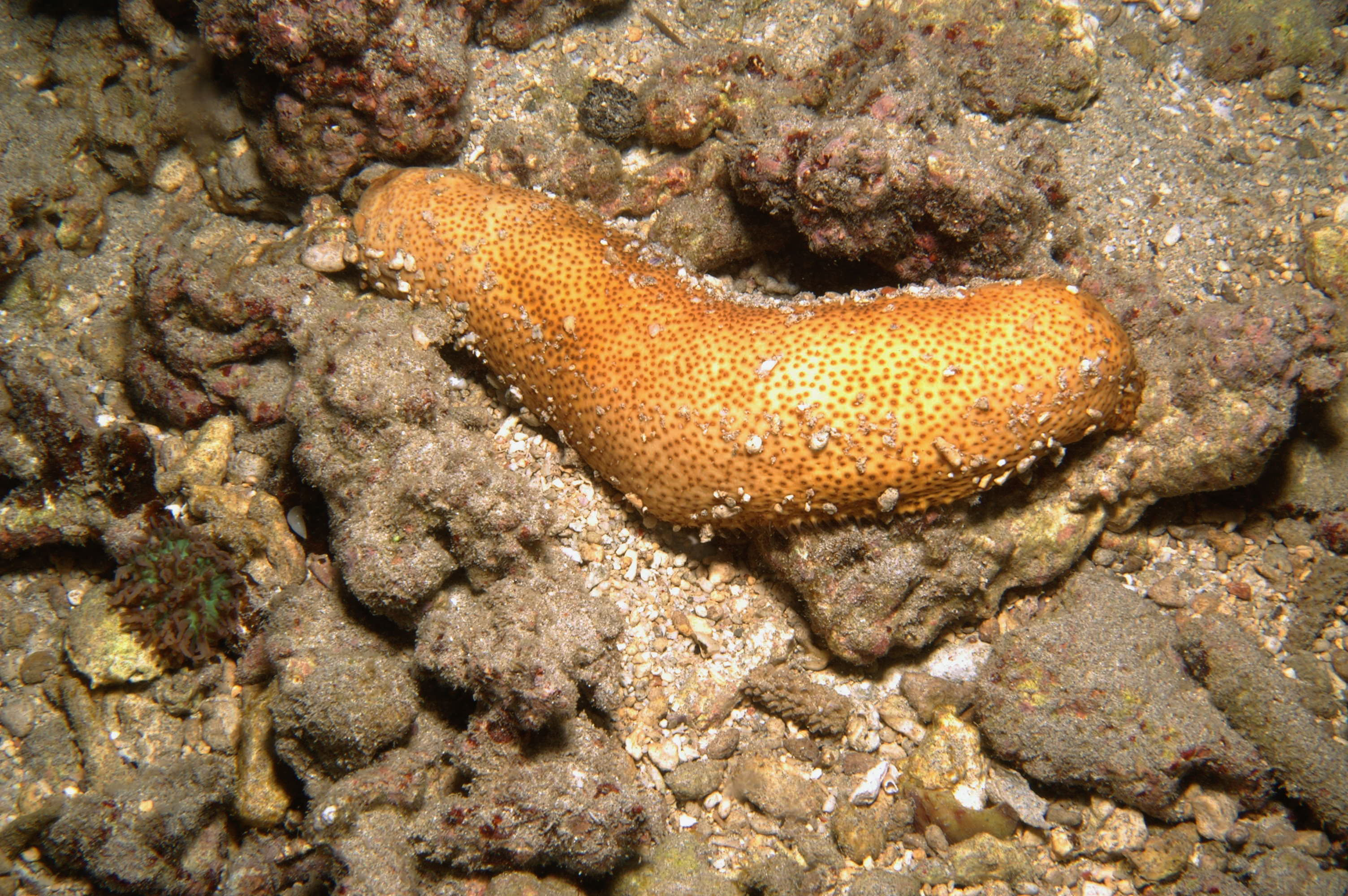
Bohadschia bivittata

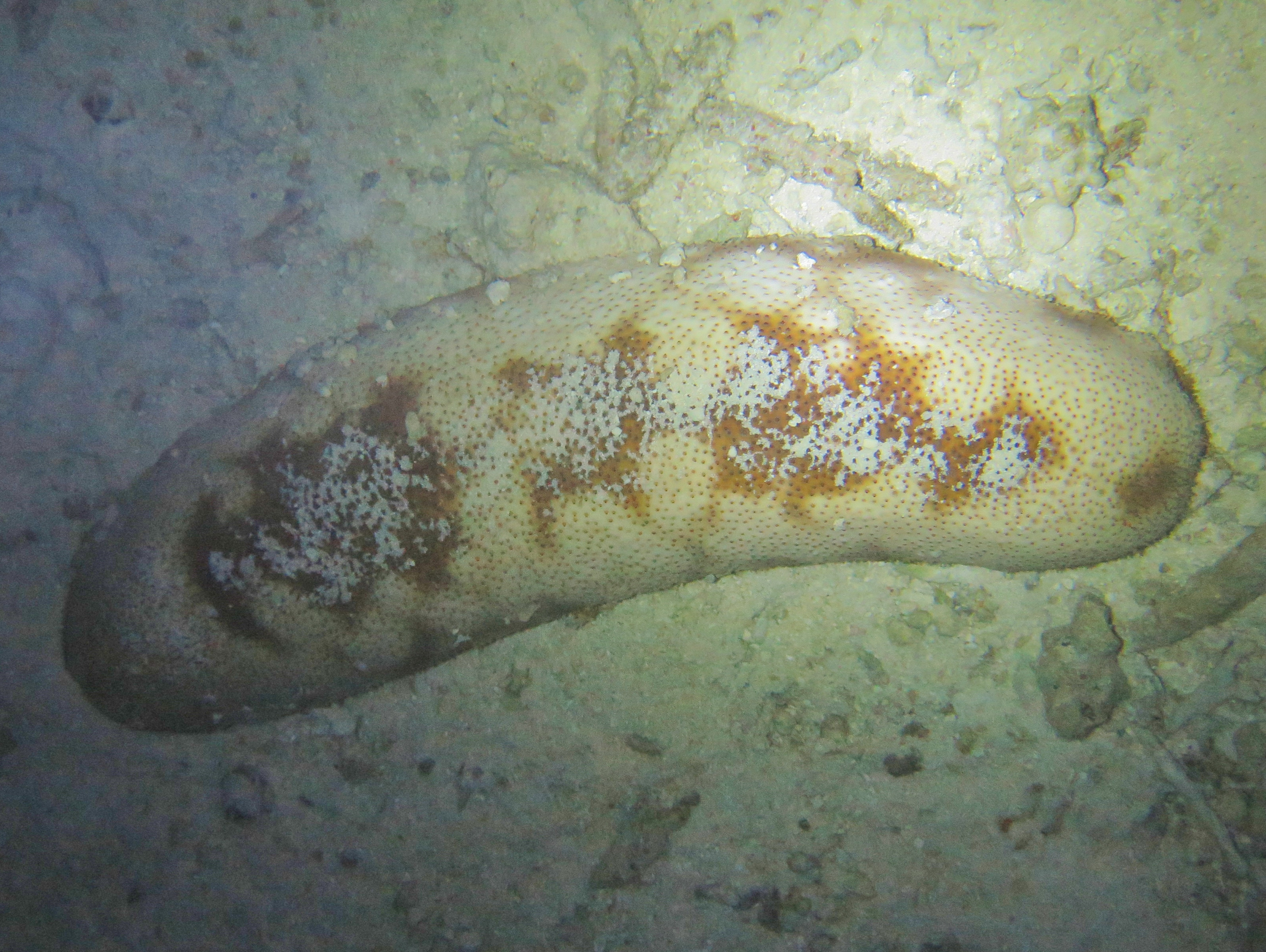
Bohadschia koellikeri

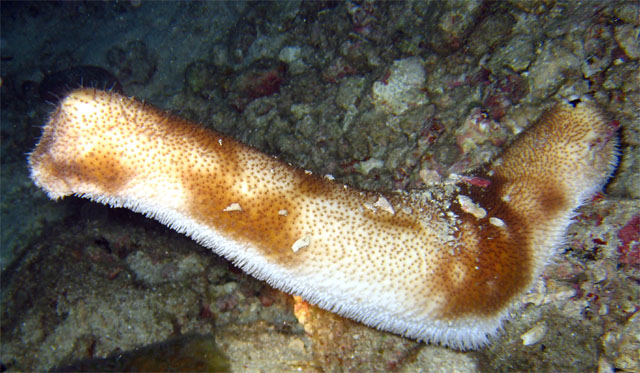
Bohadschia marmorata

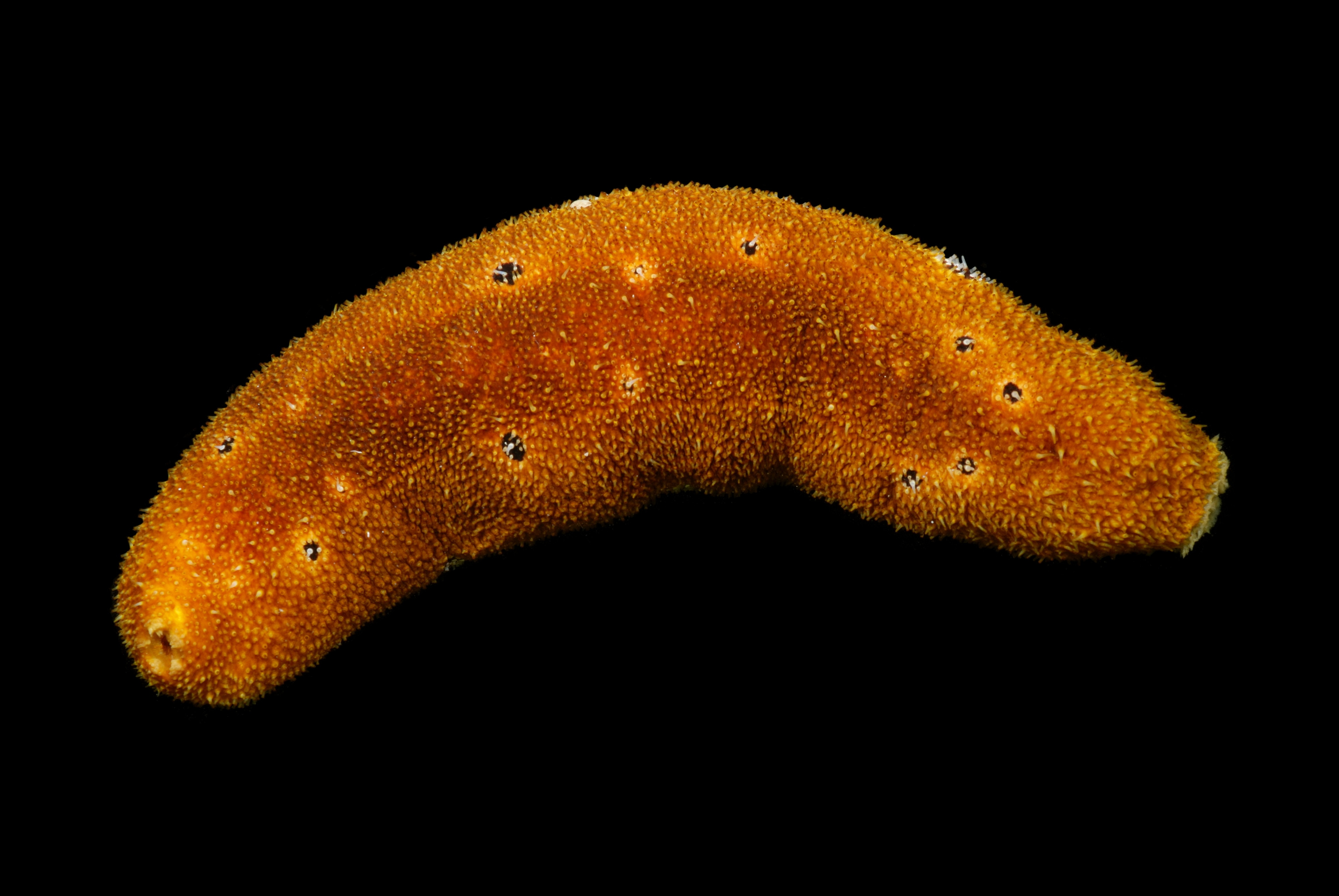
Bohadschia subrubra

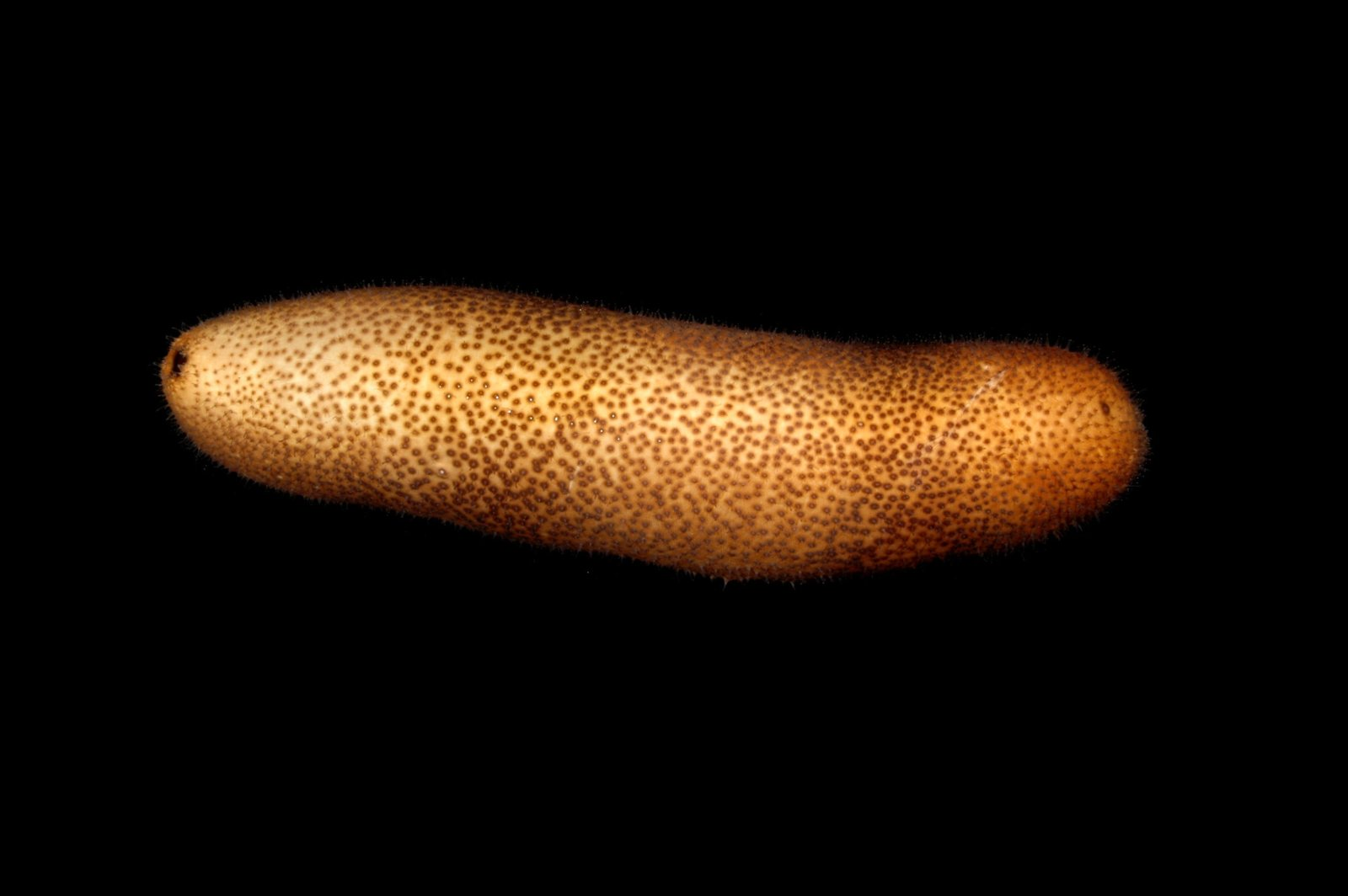
Bohadschia vitiensis
