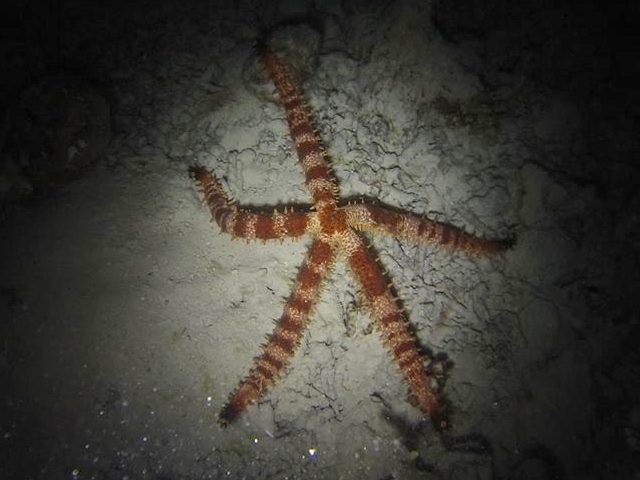
- Mithrodia clavigera in the Maldives

Scientific classification
- Kingdom: Animalia
- Phylum: Echinodermata
- Class: Asteroidea
- Order: Valvatida
- Family: Mithrodiidae
- Genus: Mithrodia
- Species: M. clavigera

Binomial name
- Mithrodia clavigera (Lamarck, 1816)

= Mithrodia clavigera =

Species of starfish

Mithrodia clavigera is a species of tropical starfish in the family Mithrodiidae. It has pale flesh tone with large brick-red patches. Its specimens preserved in alcohol become uniformly white.
