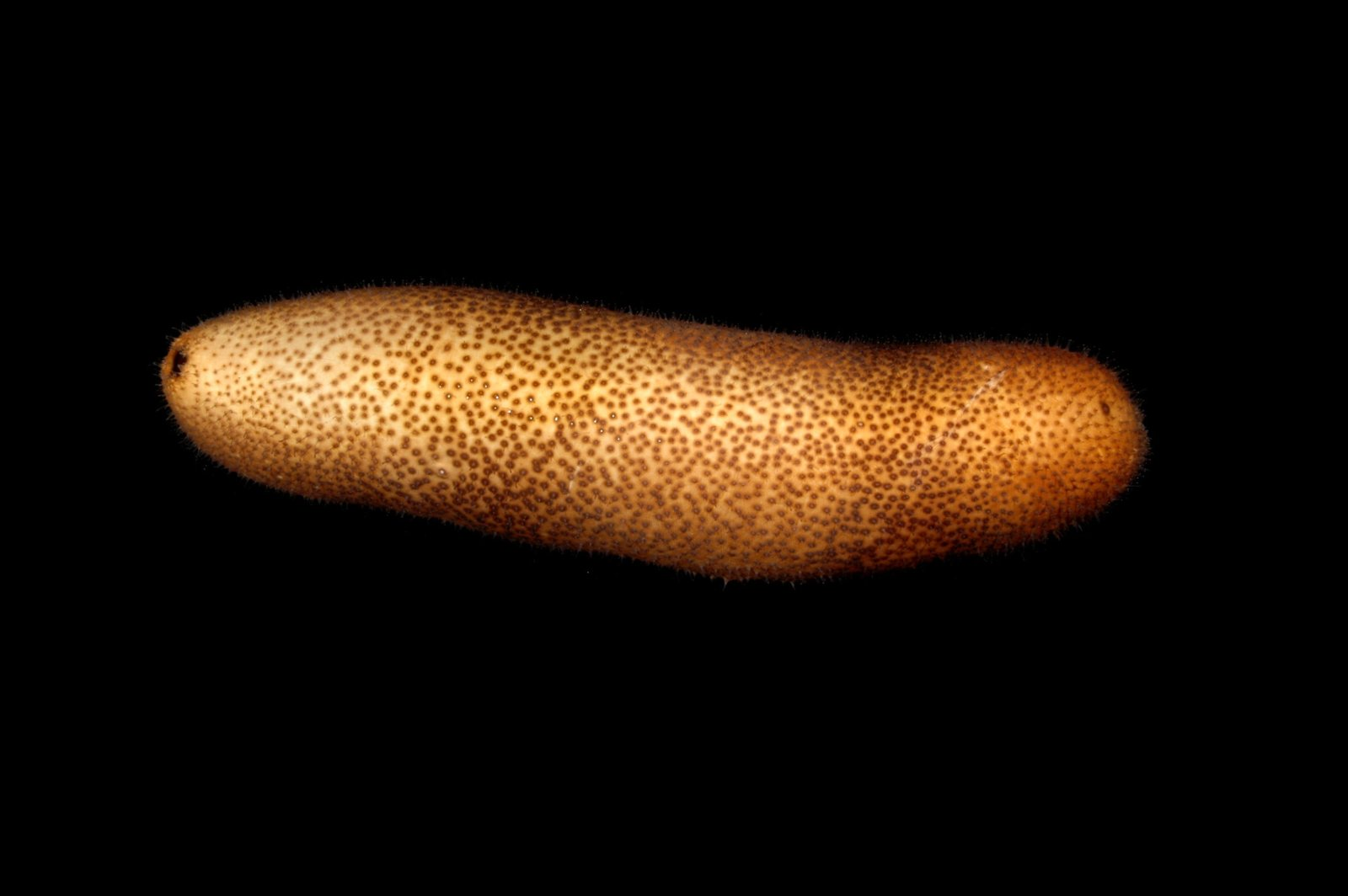

Conservation status
- Data Deficient (IUCN 3.1)

Scientific classification
- Kingdom: Animalia
- Phylum: Echinodermata
- Class: Holothuroidea
- Order: Holothuriida
- Family: Holothuriidae
- Genus: Bohadschia
- Species: B. vitiensis

Binomial name
- Bohadschia vitiensis (Semper, 1868)

Synonyms
- Holothuria vitiensis Semper, 1868

= Bohadschia vitiensis =

Species of sea cucumber

Bohadschia vitiensis is a species of sea cucumber in the family Holothuriidae. It is also known as the brown sandfish and brown sea cucumber. It is widespread in shallow waters of the Indo-Pacific. It appears to be able to hybridize with Bohadschia argus.

Bohadschia vitiensis can grow to 50 cm (20 in) in total length. The average weight is 1,200–1,600 g (42–56 oz). It is harvested commercially, which has led to local depletions.
