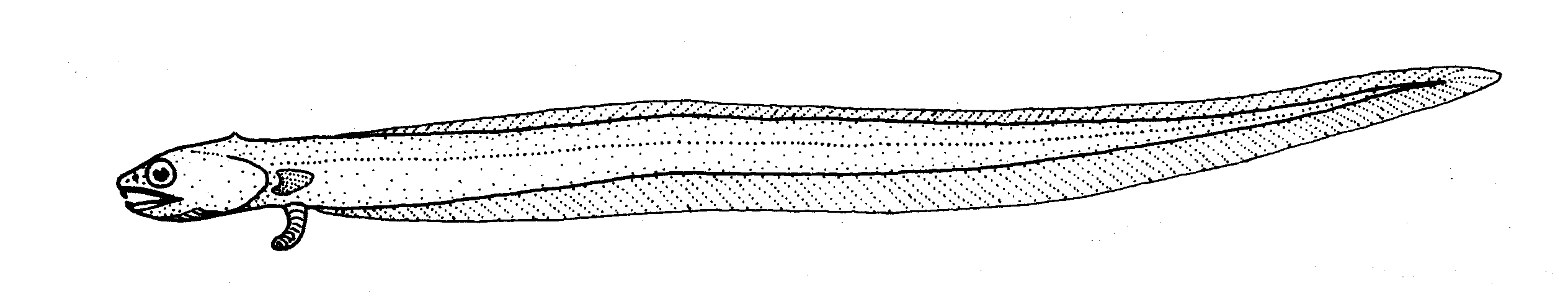
- Rendahl's messmate, E. rendahli

Scientific classification
- Kingdom: Animalia
- Phylum: Chordata
- Class: Actinopterygii
- Order: Ophidiiformes
- Family: Carapidae
- Subfamily: Carapinae
- Genus: Echiodon; W. Thompson, 1837

Type species
- Echiodon drummondii Thompson, 1837

= Echiodon =

Genus of fishes

Echiodon is a genus of pearlfishes, with these currently recognized species:

- Echiodon anchipterus J. T. Williams, 1984 (closefin pearlfish)
- Echiodon atopus M. E. Anderson, 2005
- Echiodon coheni J. T. Williams, 1984
- Echiodon cryomargarites Markle, J. T. Williams & Olney, 1983 (messmate)
- Echiodon dawsoni J. T. Williams & Shipp, 1982 (Chain pearlfish)
- Echiodon dentatus (G. Cuvier, 1829)
- Echiodon drummondii W. Thompson, 1837
- Echiodon exsilium Rosenblatt, 1961 (nocturnal pearlfish)
- Echiodon neotes Markle & Olney, 1990
- Echiodon pegasus Markle & Olney, 1990
- Echiodon prionodon Parmentier, 2012
- Echiodon pukaki Markle & Olney, 1990
- Echiodon rendahli (Whitley, 1941) (Rendahl's messmate)

The name derives from Ancient Greek εχις (echis, "viper") and ὀδόν (odon, "tooth").
