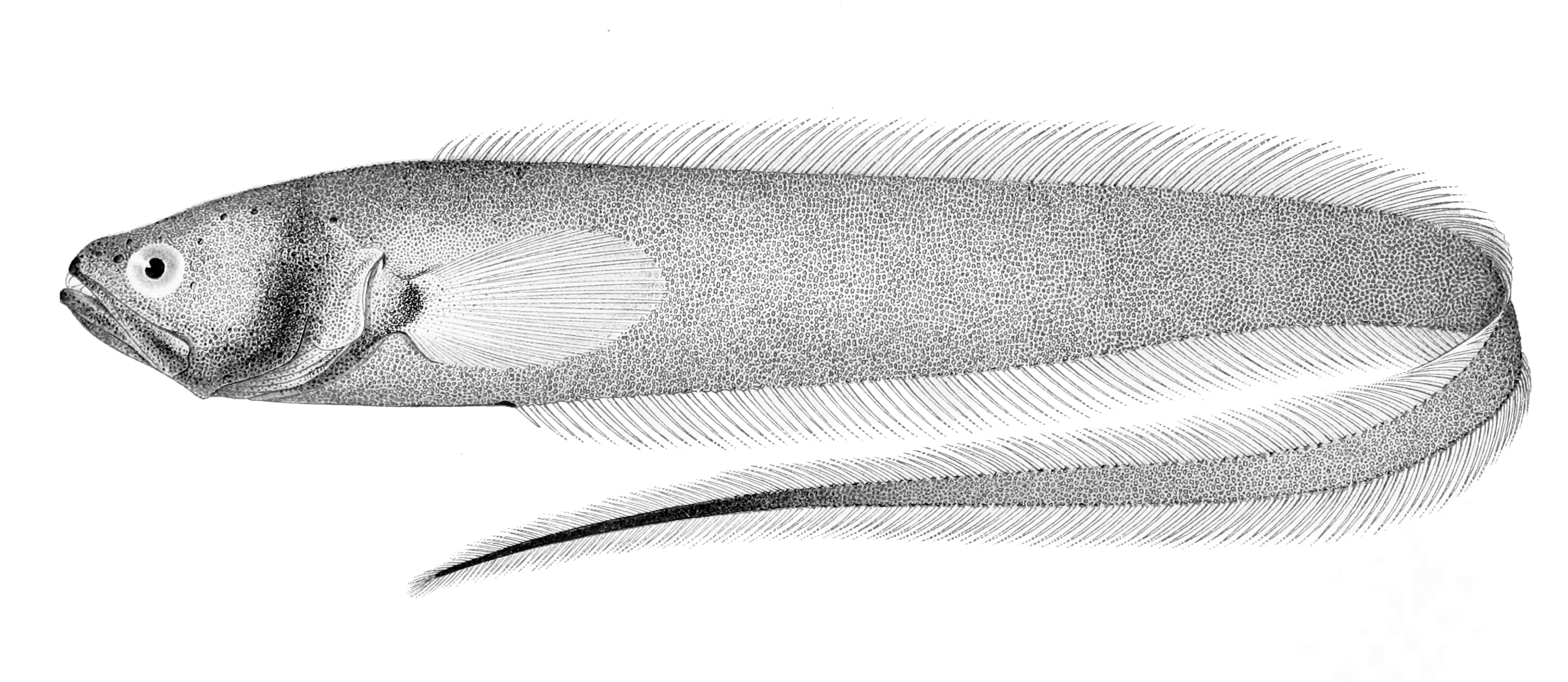

Conservation status
- Least Concern (IUCN 3.1)

Scientific classification
- Kingdom: Animalia
- Phylum: Chordata
- Class: Actinopterygii
- Division: Teleostei
- Order: Ophidiiformes
- Family: Carapidae
- Subfamily: Pyramodontinae
- Genus: Snyderidia
- Species: S. canina

Binomial name
- Snyderidia canina C. H. Gilbert, 1905

Synonyms
- Snyderidia bothrops Robins & Nielsen, 1970

= Snyderidia =

Species of fish

Snyderidia canina is a species of pearlfish found in all tropical waters but those of the eastern Pacific Ocean, depths from 110 to 1,762 m (360 to 5,780 ft). This species grows to a length of 26.8 cm (10.6 in). This fish is the only known species in its genus which was named in honour of the ichthyologist John Otterbein Snyder (1867–1943) for the assistance he lent to Charles Henry Gilbert on the cruise to Hawaii on which the type specimen was collected.
