= Bohadschia paradoxa =

Conservation status
- Data Deficient (IUCN 3.1)

Scientific classification
- Kingdom: Animalia
- Phylum: Echinodermata
- Class: Holothuroidea
- Order: Holothuriida
- Family: Holothuriidae
- Genus: Bohadschia
- Species: B. paradoxa

Binomial name
- Bohadschia paradoxa (Selenka, 1867)

Synonyms
- Holothuria paradoxa Selenka, 1867

Species of sea cucumber

Bohadschia paradoxa is a sea cucumber in the family Holothuriidae that is common in the Indo-Pacific.
