= James Lawson Drummond =

Irish physician, naturalist and botanist

James Lawson Drummond (c. 1783 – 1853) was an Irish medical doctor, naturalist and botanist.

Drummond was born in Larne, Co. Antrim and educated at the Belfast Academy. He received a surgical training at the Belfast Academical Institution and was an apprentice surgeon in the Royal Navy. After serving as navy surgeon in the Mediterranean from 1807 to 1813, he retired from the navy in May 1813 and then further studied medicine in Edinburgh. With a thesis on the comparative anatomy of the eye, Drummond graduated M.D. from Edinburgh on 24 June 1814.

In 1814 he was Physician to Belfast Dispensary and in the Belfast Academical Institution where in 1818 he had been appointed Professor of Anatomy and Physiology. In 1822, with William Drennan, Robert Tennent, and James MacDonnell, he was one of four physicians who revived the Belfast Medical Society, and in 1835 was the first president of the Belfast medical school established with the now "Royal" Belfast Academical Institution, In the same year, he was appointed Professor of Botany.

Together with MacDonnell, Tennent and five other prominent citizens of the town (locally known as the apostles), he co-founded the Belfast Natural History Society (later the Belfast Natural History and Philosophical Society) in 1821, becoming its first president. In 1831 the society established the first museum in Ireland erected by public subscription - the forerunner of the Ulster Museum. Drummond was also one of the leading promotors of the Botanic Garden in Belfast.

The standard author abbreviation J.L.Drumm. is used to indicate this person as the author when citing a botanical name. The Drummond's sea cucumber Thyonidium drummondi (Thompson, 1840) was named for him, as was the pearlfish Echiodon drummondii.

A collection of his notebooks are held at the University of St Andrews.

His elder brother was the poet and controversialist William Hamilton Drummond.
