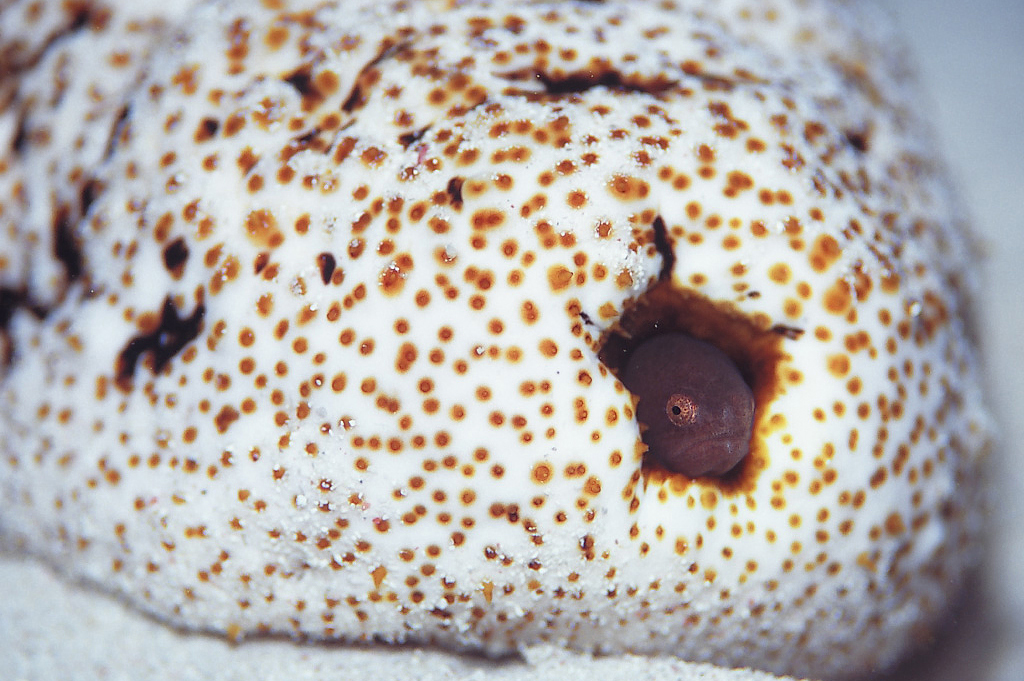
- A pinhead pearlfish, Encheliophis boraborensis, at Kaltim, Indonesia - night dive

Scientific classification
- Kingdom: Animalia
- Phylum: Chordata
- Class: Actinopterygii
- Order: Ophidiiformes
- Family: Carapidae
- Genus: Encheliophis
- Species: E. boraborensis

Binomial name
- Encheliophis boraborensis (Kaup, 1856)

Synonyms
- Carapus parvipinnis (Kaup, 1856); Carapus boraborensis (Kaup, 1856); Encheliophis parvipinnis (Kaup, 1856); Fierasfer boraborensis Kaup, 1856; Fierasfer kagoshimanus Steindachner & Döderlein, 1887; Fierasfer parvipinnis Kaup, 1856; Jordanicus parvipinnis (Kaup, 1856); Rhizoiketicus carolinensis Vaillant, 1893

= Pinhead pearlfish =

Species of fish

The pinhead pearlfish, Encheliophis boraborensis, is a species of slender, ray-finned fish in the family Carapidae found in the tropical Indo-Pacific Ocean; it normally lives inside the body cavity of a sea cucumber such as the pineapple sea cucumber (Thelenota ananas) or the leopard sea cucumber (Bohadschia argus).

== Description ==
The pinhead pearlfish is a slender, tapering, eel-like fish that can grow to a length of 30 cm (12 in). It has very small eyes and near the jaws are star-shaped melanophores which are more numerous in older specimens. This fish has no scales or pelvic fins, but does have short pectoral fins and an elongated dorsal fin with 31 to 42 soft rays. The equally long anal fin has 45 to 57 soft rays, and C. boraborensis is the only species in the family to have melanophores on its anal fins. It is a medium brown-coloured fish with a solid body and much enlarged swim bladder that occupies most of its body cavity.

== Distribution ==
The pinhead pearlfish is found in the Indo-Pacific Ocean at depths to 150 m (490 ft). Its range extends from Mauritius and the Society Islands, northwards to Taiwan and the Yaeyama Islands, including the Mariana Islands and Caroline Islands.

== Biology ==
E. boraborensis is normally found living in the body cavity of a sea cucumber which it enters through the anus. The leopard sea cucumber (B. argus) is favoured and the pineapple sea cucumber (T. ananas) is also used for this purpose. Competition between carapid fish occurs for the right to occupy a host. Two male adults were observed to fight when inside the sea cucumber until one was killed, other fish have been found with bite marks on its tail and one adult was found to have a juvenile silver pearlfish (Encheliophis homei) in its stomach. Whereas Encheliophis homei emerges at night from its host to forage, Encheliophis boraborensis, with its small eyes and specialised mouthparts, may at least in part feed on its host's tissues.

When E. boraborensis enters a host and finds a carapid fish already present, it makes a noise. The sounds emitted are regular pulses and the timing in males and females is different, so it is possible to tell the sex of the fish from the sounds it makes. If the fish already present is the closely related silver pearlfish, the sound is often reduced to a single longer pulse. When E. homei enters a sea cucumber already occupied by E. boraborensis, the sound it emits is also often reduced to a single pulse, but in this case it is shorter than its normal call. Both fish are able to change their calls, adapting them to whichever species of fish they encounter inside their hosts.
