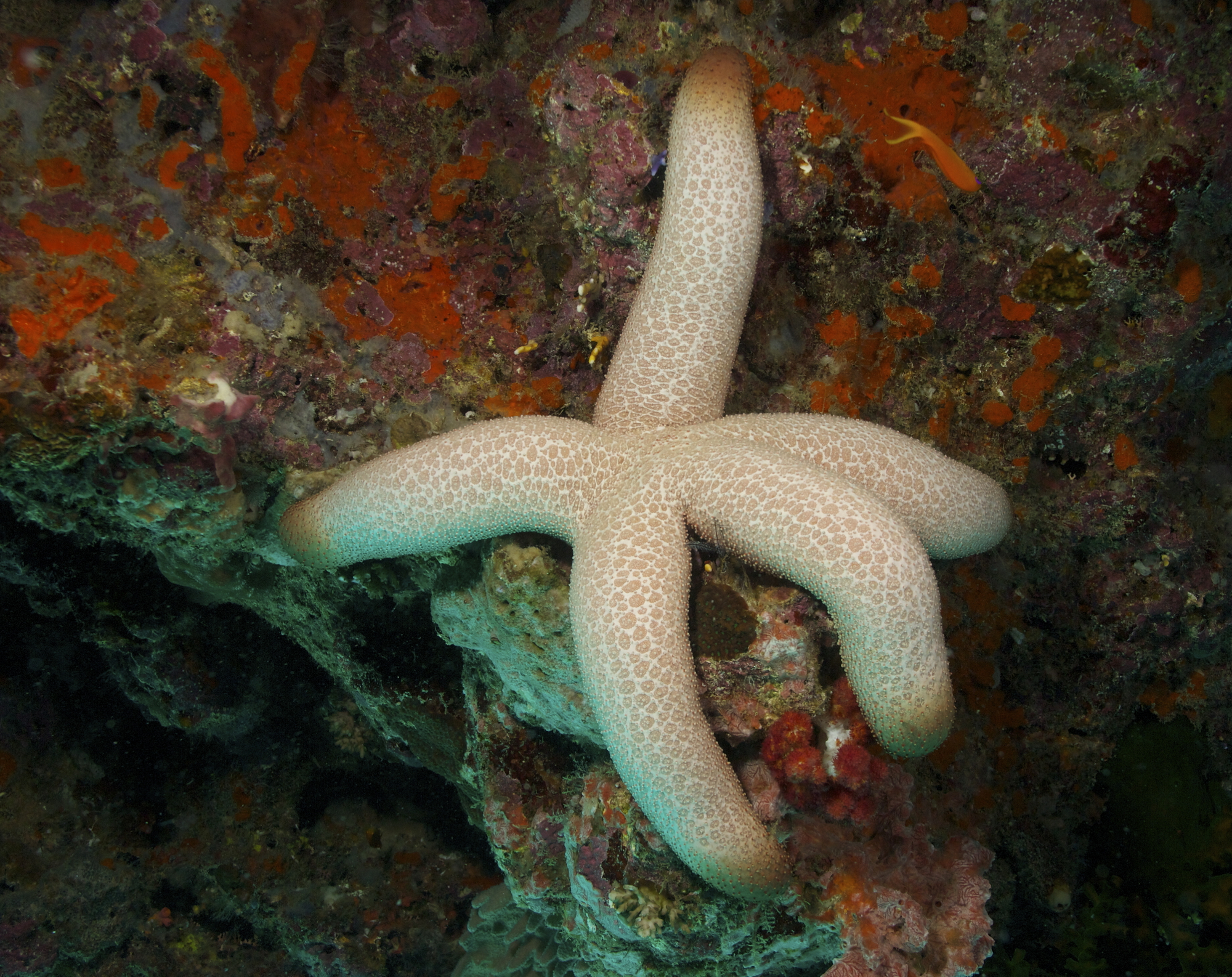
- Thromidia catalai

Scientific classification
- Kingdom: Animalia
- Phylum: Echinodermata
- Class: Asteroidea
- Order: Valvatida
- Family: Mithrodiidae; Viguier, 1878

= Mithrodiidae =

Family of starfishes

The Mithrodiidae is a family of starfish in the order Valvatida.

Members of this family are big to huge tropical sea stars with 5 arms, rounded in cross-section.

== List of genera and species ==
- Genus Mithrodia Gray, 1840
  - Mithrodia bradleyi Verrill, 1870
  - Mithrodia clavigera (Lamarck, 1816)
  - Mithrodia fisheri Holly, 1932
- Genus Thromidia Pope & Rowe, 1977
  - Thromidia brycei Marsh, 2009
  - Thromidia catalai Pope & Rowe, 1977
  - Thromidia gigas (Mortensen, 1935)
  - Thromidia seychellesensis Pope & Rowe, 1977

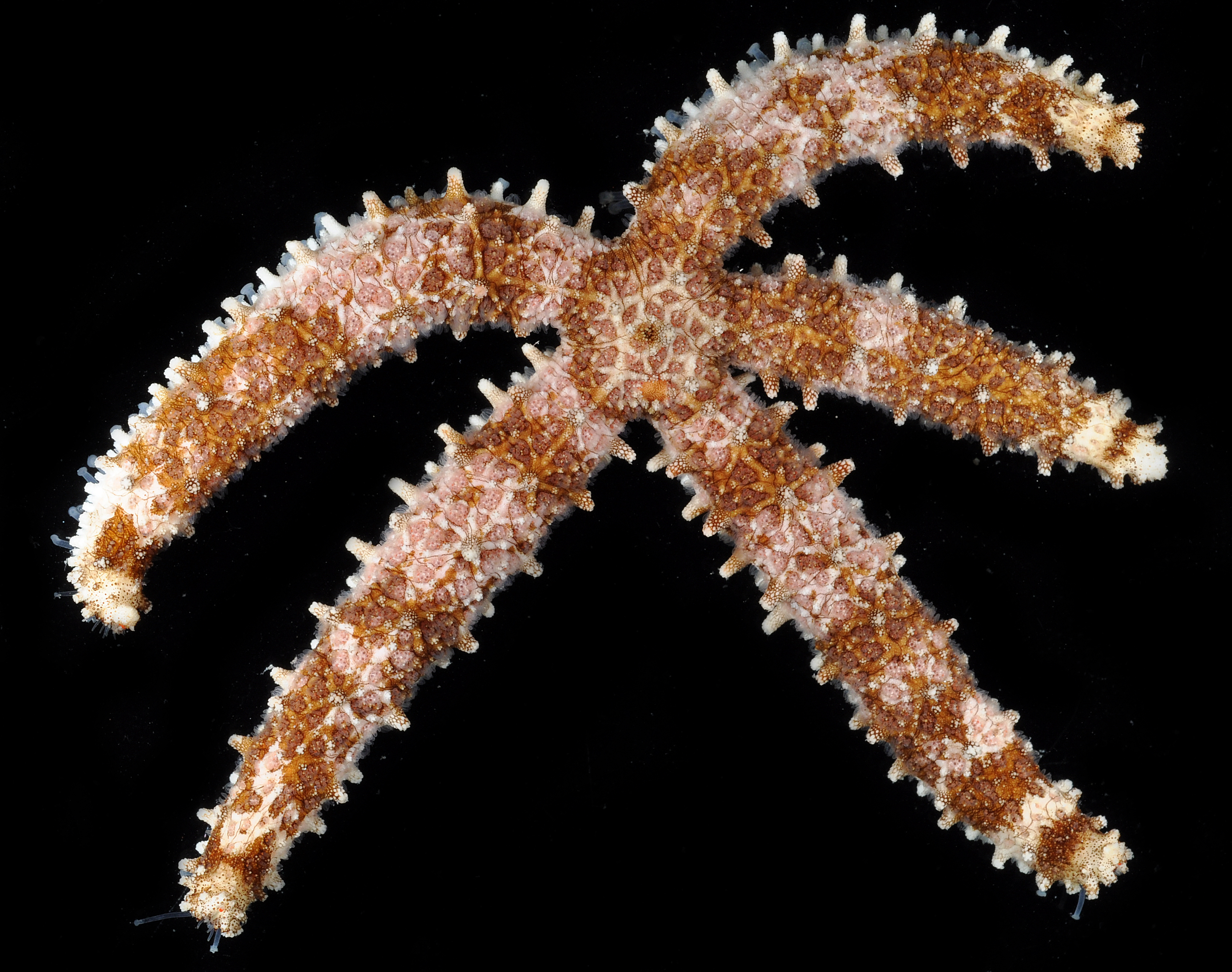
Mithrodia clavigera
