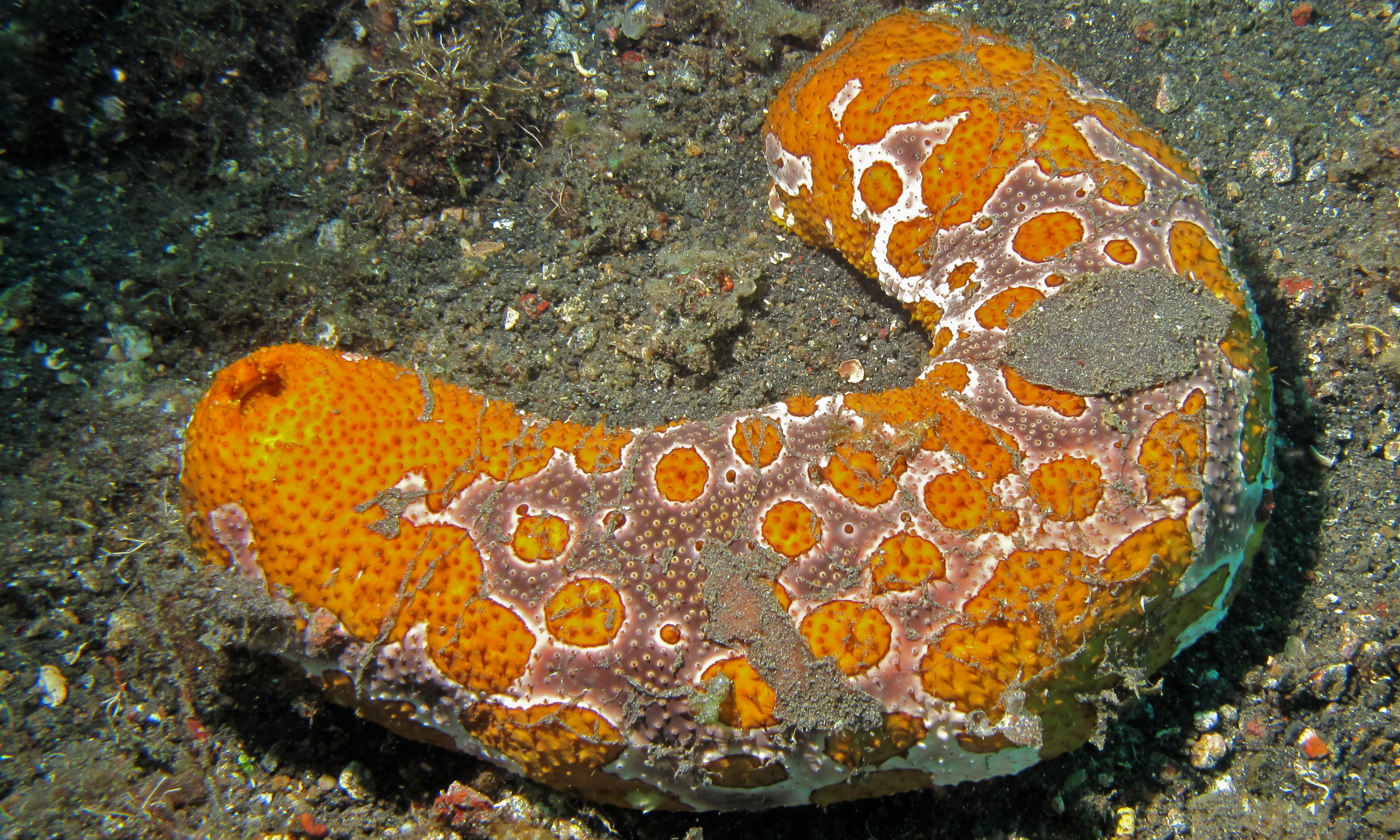
- Bohadschia ocellata off the coast of Sulawesi, Indonesia

Conservation status
- Not evaluated (IUCN 3.1)

Scientific classification
- Kingdom: Animalia
- Phylum: Echinodermata
- Class: Holothuroidea
- Order: Holothuriida
- Family: Holothuriidae
- Genus: Bohadschia
- Species: B. ocellata

Binomial name
- Bohadschia ocellata Jaeger, 1833

Synonyms
- Holothuria (Holothuria) ocellata Jaeger, 1833

= Bohadschia ocellata =

Species of sea cucumber

Bohadschia ocellata, also known as the polka-dotted sea cucumber, is a species of sea cucumber in the family Holothuriidae. It is native to the tropical Western Indo-Pacific region.

== Distribution and habitat ==
Bohadschia ocellata has a wide distribution, and is known to occur in the Timor Sea, South China Sea, Philippine Sea, and the Great Barrier Reef (particularly in and around the waters of Lizard Island National Park) at depths between 7.6 and 88.2 m (20 and 290 ft). It prefers water temperatures between 24.2 and 27.6 °C (75.6 and 81.7 °F).
