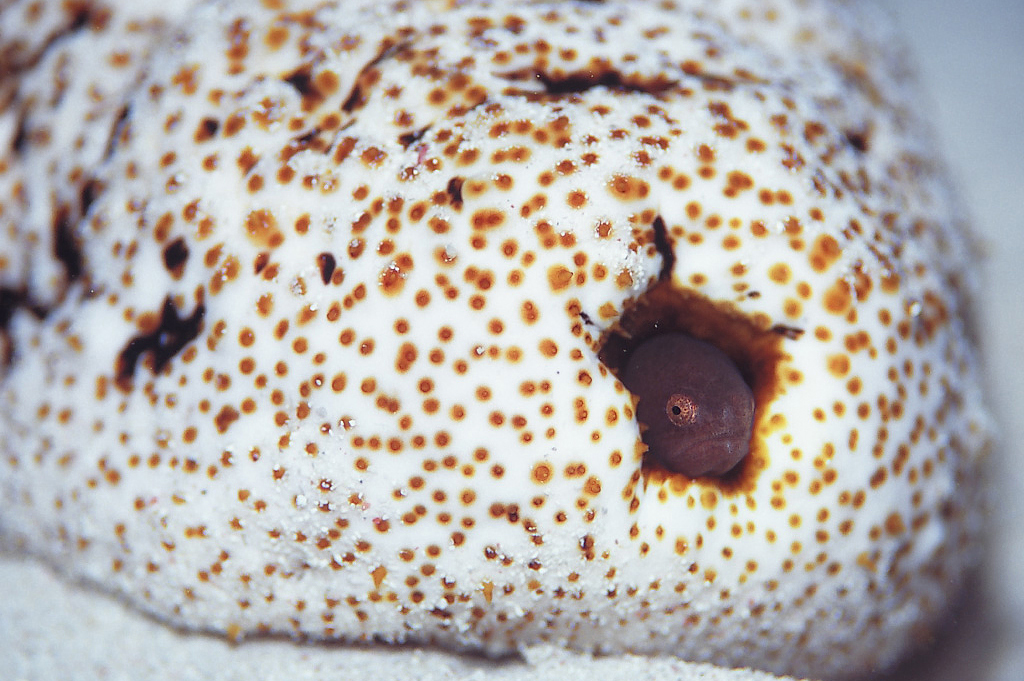
- A pinhead pearlfish, Encheliophis boraborensis, at Kaltim, Indonesia - night dive

Scientific classification
- Kingdom: Animalia
- Phylum: Chordata
- Class: Actinopterygii
- Order: Ophidiiformes
- Family: Carapidae
- Subfamily: Carapinae; Poey, 1867

= Carapinae =

Subfamily of fishes

Carapinae is a subfamily of pearlfishes, of the family Carapidae. The subfamily consists of five genera:

- Carapus Rafinesque, 1810
- Echiodon Thompson, 1837
- Encheliophis Müller, 1842
- Eurypleuron Markle & Olney, 1990
- Onuxodon J. L. B. Smith, 1955
