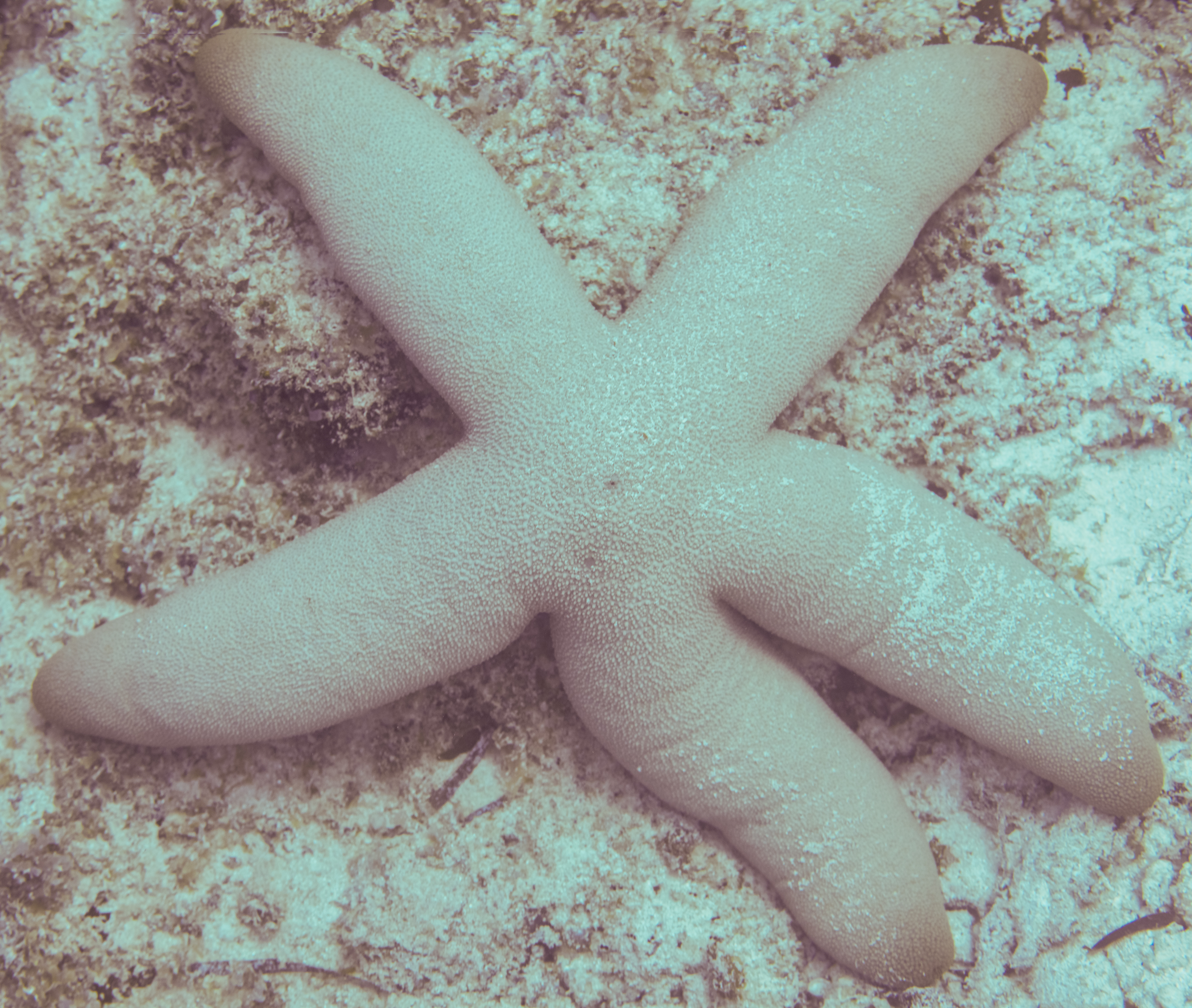

Scientific classification
- Kingdom: Animalia
- Phylum: Echinodermata
- Class: Asteroidea
- Order: Valvatida
- Family: Mithrodiidae
- Genus: Thromidia
- Species: T. gigas

Binomial name
- Thromidia gigas Mortensen, 1935

= Thromidia gigas =

Species of starfish

Thromidia gigas is a species of starfish in the family Mithrodiidae. It was described by Ole Theodor Jensen Mortensen in 1935. It lives in the Indian Ocean off the coast of eastern South Africa and southern Madagascar. This species is probably the largest echinoderm in terms of bulk, and may exceed 13 pounds (5.9 kg).
