= Eurypleuron =

Conservation status
- Data Deficient (IUCN 3.1)

Scientific classification
- Kingdom: Animalia
- Phylum: Chordata
- Class: Actinopterygii
- Order: Ophidiiformes
- Family: Carapidae
- Genus: Eurypleuron; Markle & Olney, 1990
- Species: E. owasianum

Binomial name
- Eurypleuron owasianum (Matsubara, 1953)

Synonyms
- Carapus owasianus Matsubara, 1953; Eurypleuron cinereum (J. L. B. Smith, 1955)

Genus of fishes

Eurypleuron is a monotypic genus of pearlfishes, family Carapidae. It contains only Eurypleuron owasianum, the eel pearlfish, which is a moderately sized fish reaching 22–24 cm (8.7–9.4 in) total length, found in the Southern Indian and Pacific Oceans.

The Catalog of Fishes considers Eurypleuron cinereum a synonym of Eurypleuron owasianum, rendering the genus monotypic.
