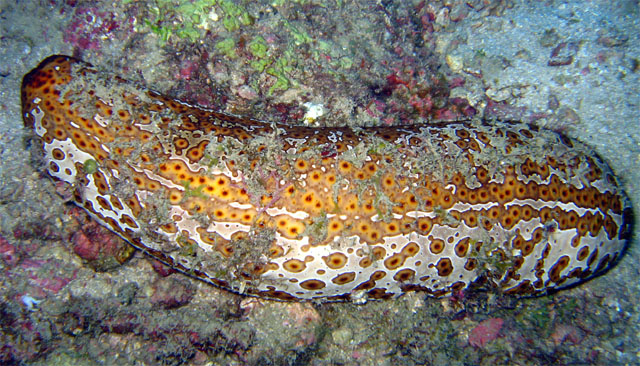
- B. argus photographed near Pulau Aur

Conservation status
- Least Concern (IUCN 3.1)

Scientific classification
- Kingdom: Animalia
- Phylum: Echinodermata
- Class: Holothuroidea
- Order: Holothuriida
- Family: Holothuriidae
- Genus: Bohadschia
- Species: B. argus

Binomial name
- Bohadschia argus Jaeger, 1833

Synonyms
- Holothuria argus Jaeger, 1833

= Bohadschia argus =

Species of sea cucumber

Bohadschia argus, the leopard sea cucumber, leopardfish, or tigerfish, is a species of sea cucumber in the family Holothuriidae. It is native to the tropical Western Indo-Pacific region.

== Description ==
Bohadschia argus has the same roughly cylindrical body plan shared by most sea cucumbers. On average, it measures approximately 36 cm (14 in) in length and 1.8 to 2.2 kg (4.0 to 4.9 lb) in weight, with a maximum recorded length of 60 cm (24 in). Its tough outer body wall, around 10 mm (0.39 in) in thickness, is firm and leathery to the touch. Its dorsal side is greyish-brown in coloration, and covered in numerous yellow eyespots, similar to those of its vernacular namesake. The underside is usually paler in coloration, although some specimens remain uniformly brown throughout.

There are several rows of tube feet on the underside, which it uses for locomotion. Surrounding the mouth at the anterior end is a ring of paddle-shaped, black feeding tentacles with white fringes. The anus, at the posterior end, has Cuvierian tubules situated at its base, which are readily ejected as sticky threads if the animal is disturbed or handled. These contain toxins which deter predators and are irritating to human skin.

Bohadschia argus appears to be able to hybridize with Bohadschia vitiensis.

== Distribution and habitat ==
Bohadschia argus inhabits shallow tropical waters throughout the eastern Indian Ocean and the western Pacific. It is commonly found in and around coral reefs on exposed, sandy areas of the seabed, typically at depths of 2 to 10 m (6.6 to 32.8 ft) below the surface.

== Ecology and behavior ==
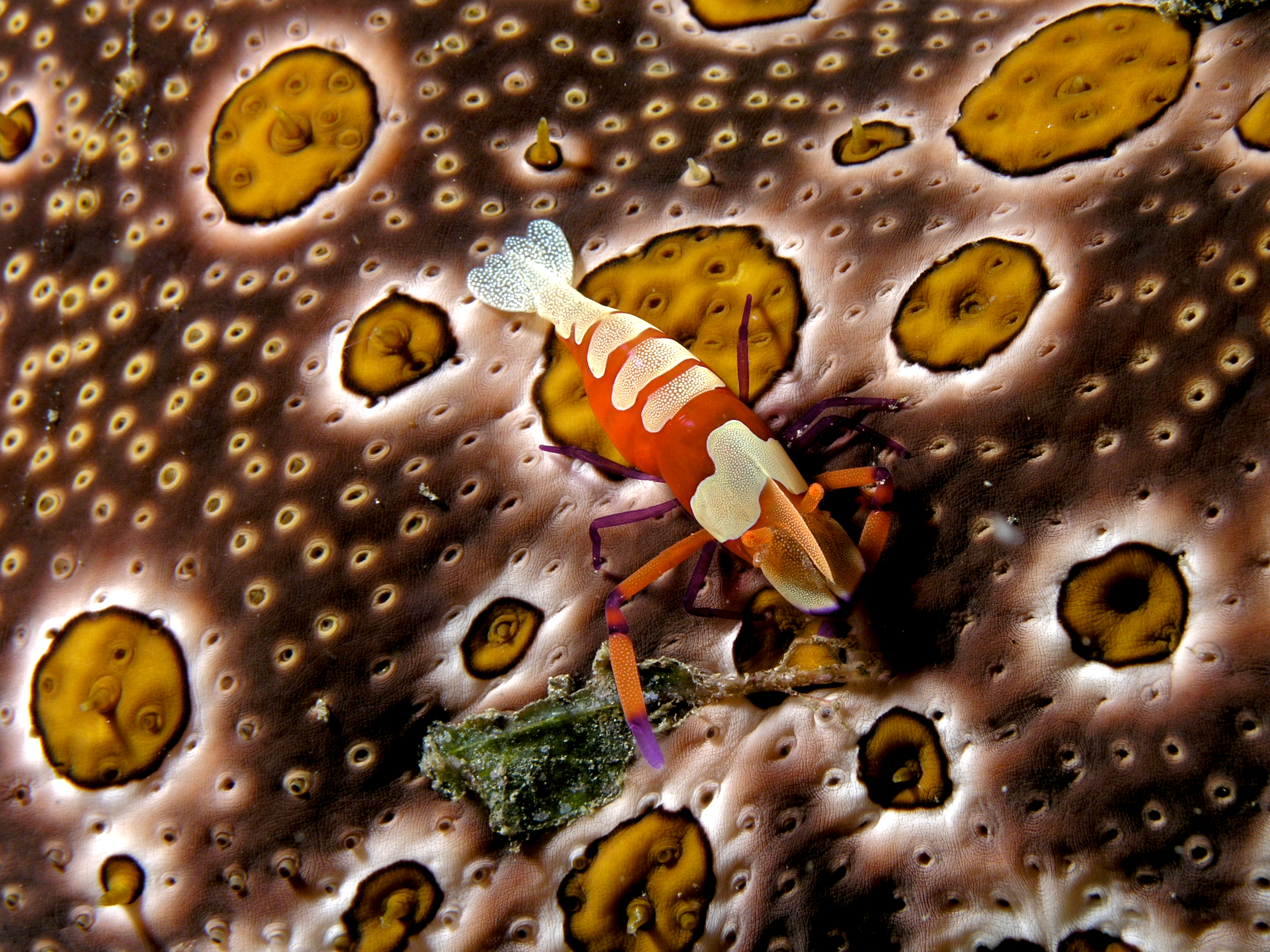
Emperor shrimp (Zenopontonia rex) on a Bohadschia argus

Bohadschia argus is an detritivore. As it moves across the seabed, it sweeps sand grains and detritus into its mouth using its sticky tentacles. It obtains some nourishment from the biofilm that coats the grains.

=== Symbiotic relationships ===
Pearlfish of the species Carapus mourlani (star pearlfish) and Encheliophis boraborensis (pinhead pearlfish) are sometimes found living in the coelomic cavity of Bohadschia argus, typically entering head-first through the sea cucumber's anus. In a study in the Banda Islands in the South Moluccan Sea, a group of 15 star pearlfish were found living within the body cavity of a single Bohadschia argus. Carapus mourlani, which have a mutualistic relationship with Bohadschia argus, will aggressively defend their sea cucumber from the parasitic Encheliophis boraborensis, and in some cases may even fight them to the death.

The emperor shrimp (Zenopontonia rex) is often associated with Bohadschia argus, and may help keep it clear of ectoparasites.

== Uses ==
A new triterpene glycoside, Arguside A, has been extracted from the tissues of Bohadschia argus. This compound appears to exhibit cytotoxicity against several different types of human tumor cells.
