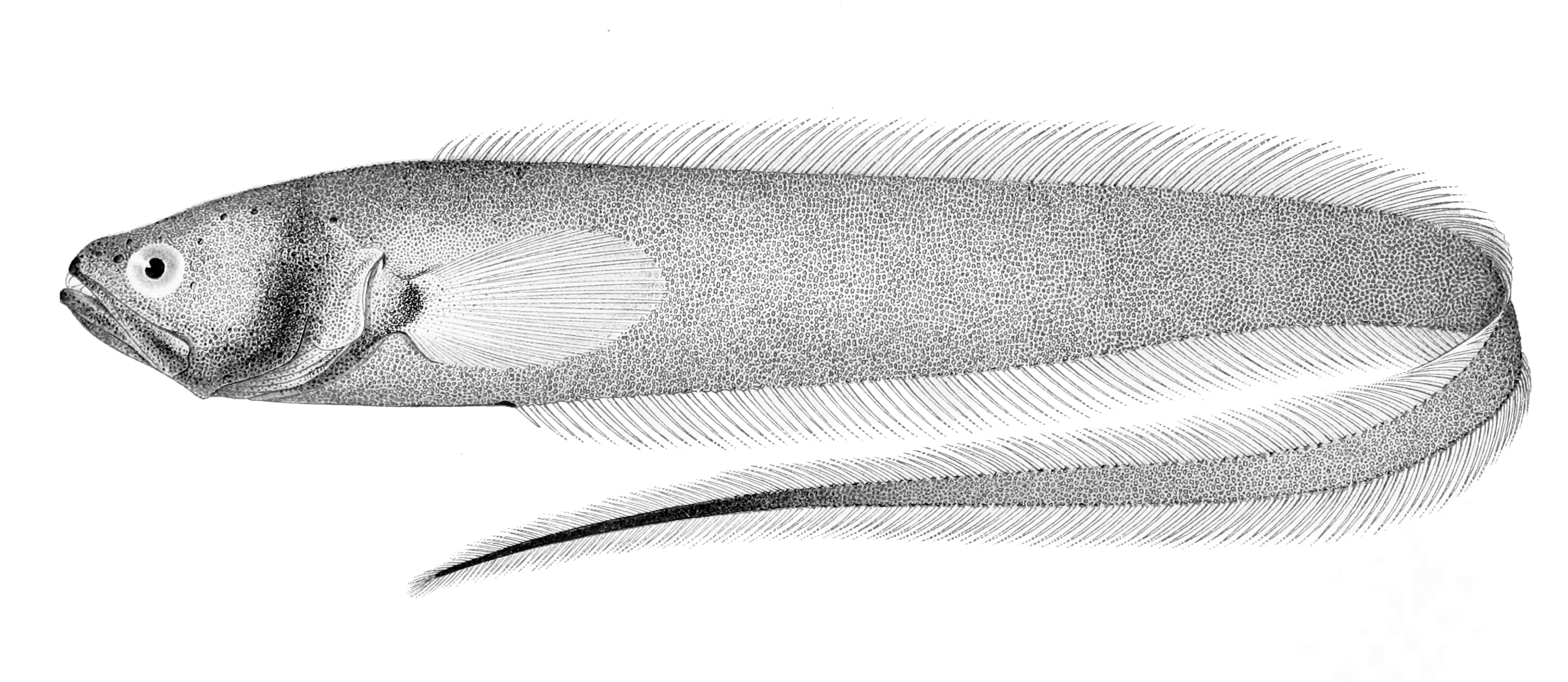
- Snyderidia canina

Scientific classification
- Kingdom: Animalia
- Phylum: Chordata
- Class: Actinopterygii
- Order: Ophidiiformes
- Family: Carapidae
- Subfamily: Pyramodontinae; J. L. B. Smith, 1955

= Pyramodontinae =

Subfamily of fishes

Pyramodontinae is a subfamily of pearlfishes, of the family Carapidae. The subfamily consists of two genera:

- Pyramodon H. M. Smith & Radcliffe, 1913
- Snyderidia C. H. Gilbert, 1905
