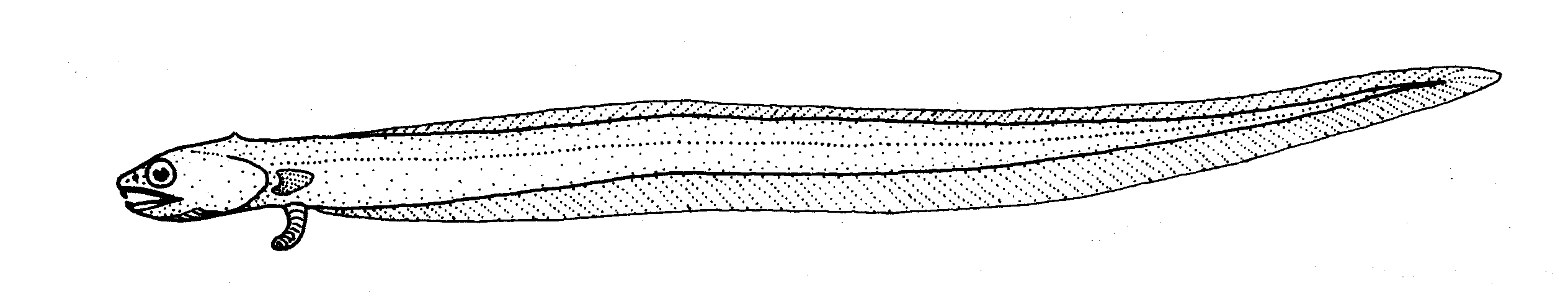
- Echiodon rendahli

Scientific classification
- Kingdom: Animalia
- Phylum: Chordata
- Class: Actinopterygii
- Order: Ophidiiformes
- Suborder: Ophidioidei
- Family: Carapidae; Poey, 1867

Sub-families & Genera
- Carapinae; Carapus; Echiodon; Encheliophis; Eurypleuron; Onuxodon; Pyramodontinae; Pyramodon; Snyderidia; Tetragondacninae; Tetragondacnus

= Pearlfish =

Family of fishes

Pearlfish are marine fish in the ray-finned fish family Carapidae. Pearlfishes inhabit the tropical waters of the Atlantic, Indian, and Pacific Oceans at depths to 2,000 m (6,600 ft), along oceanic shelves and slopes. They are slender, elongated fish with no scales, translucent bodies, and dorsal fin rays which are shorter than their anal fin rays. Adults of most species live symbiotically inside various invertebrate hosts, and some live parasitically inside sea cucumbers. The larvae are free living.

== Characteristics ==
Pearlfishes are slender, distinguished by having dorsal fin rays that are shorter than their anal fin rays. They have translucent, scaleless bodies reminiscent of eels. The largest pearlfish are about 50 cm (20 in) in length. They reproduce by laying oval-shaped eggs, about 1 mm in length.

== Ecology ==
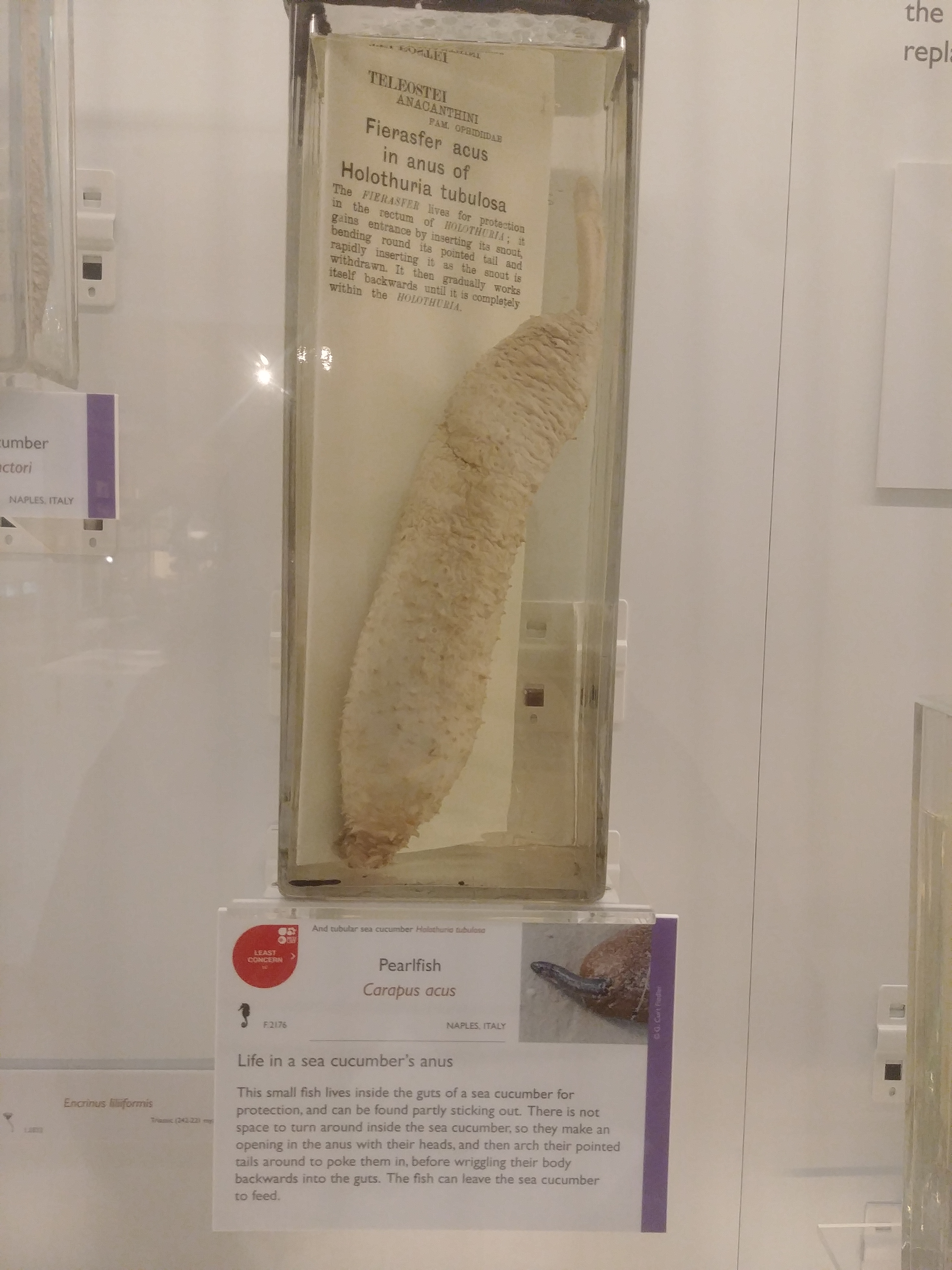
Pearlfish preserved emerging from anus of sea cucumber, Zoology Museum, Cambridge

Pearlfishes are unusual in that the adults of most species live inside various types of invertebrates. They typically live inside clams, sea cucumbers, starfish, or sea squirts, and are simply commensal, not harming their hosts. However, some species are known to be parasitic towards sea cucumbers, eating their gonads and other internal organs. Pearlfish usually live alone, or in pairs.

Regardless of the habits of the adults, the larvae of pearlfish are free-living among the plankton. Pearlfish larvae can be distinguished by the presence of a long filament in front of their dorsal fins, sometimes with various appendages attached.

== Genera ==
The genera are divided into three major groupings based on their level of symbiosis:

- Echiodon and Snyderidia - free-living
- Carapus and Onuxodon - commensal
- Encheliophis - mostly parasitic, fish in this group live in invertebrate hosts found in shallow-water coral communities such as bivalves, sea cucumbers, and starfish.
