= Dr. K.K. Mohammed Koya Sea Cucumber Conservation Reserve =

Sea cucumber conservation area

- Cheriyapani Conservation Reserve
- Location within India
- Location: Lakshadweep, India
- Nearest city: Bitra
- Coordinates: 11.902°N 71.783°E
- Area: 239 km^{2} (92 sq mi)
- Established: 27 February 2020
- Governing body: Ministry of Environment, Forest and Climate Change

The Dr. K.K. Mohammed Koya Sea Cucumber Conservation Reserve is a marine protected area located off the coast of the Indian union territory of Lakshadweep, approximately 50 km (31 mi) northwest of the island of Bitra. Formally established by Indian authorities on February 27th, 2020, the reserve covers 239 km^{2} (92 sq mi) of the Arabian Sea, including parts of the Byramgore (Cheriyapani) Reef, and is the world's first conservation area specifically dedicated to the protection of sea cucumbers.

== Background ==
=== Sea cucumbers in the black market ===
Since 2001, sea cucumbers have been protected in India under Schedule I of the Wild Life (Protection) Act, 1972 (WLPA), affording them the same level of protection under the law as endangered species such as tigers and lions. This includes a total ban on their commercial harvest and transportation in any form. This sharp decrease in supply has created an exorbitant demand for them in the Asian black market, especially for use in traditional Chinese medicine for the treatment of erectile dysfunction. In recent years, this has increased to the point where criminal organizations such as the Japanese yakuza reportedly make more money from smuggling sea cucumbers into countries such as China and Malaysia than they do from the sale of methamphetamine.

=== Establishment of Indian conservation reserves ===
Proposals for the creation of a marine protected area (MPA) in India to combat this trend have existed as early as 2003. Proposals for the Aggatti Conservation Reserve were first moved in 2008, and in 2020, three MPAs were created in Lakshadweep: the Dr. K.K. Mohammed Koya Sea Cucumber Conservation Reserve, the Attakoya Thangal Marine Reserve 344 km^{2} (133 sq mi), and the PM Sayeed Marine Birds Conservation Reserve 62 km^{2} (24 sq mi). Collectively, they cover a total area of 685 km^{2} (264 sq mi).

== List of protected species ==
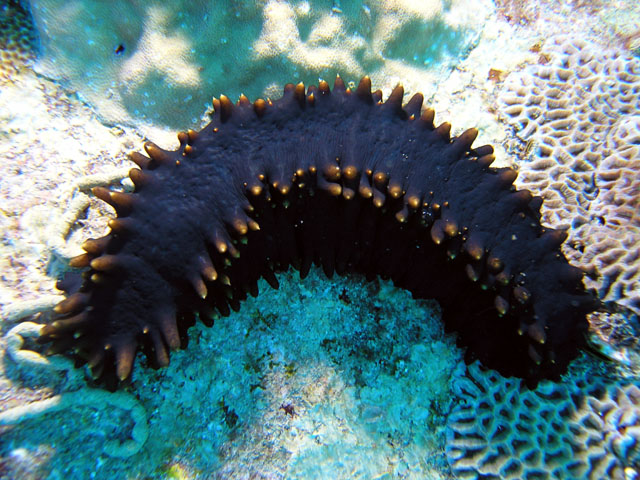
Stichopus chloronotus is one of the most abundant species in the area.

The following 21 species of sea cucumbers are known to occur throughout the Lakshadweep archipelago, including the Dr. K.K. Mohammed Koya Sea Cucumber Conservation Reserve. Vulnerable and endangered species, as assessed by the IUCN Red List, are marked with VU and EN.

- Family Holothuriidae (15 sp.)
  - Genus Actinopyga
    - Actinopyga mauritiana VU
  - Genus Bohadschia
    - Bohadschia sp. 1
    - Bohadschia sp. 2
  - Genus Holothuria
    - Holothuria atra
    - Holothuria cinerascens
    - Holothuria difficilis
    - Holothuria edulis
    - Holothuria hilla
    - Holothuria leucospilota
    - Holothuria nobilis EN
    - Holothuria pardalis
    - Holothuria pervicax
    - Holothuria scabra EN
  - Genus Labidodemas
    - Labidodemas rugosum
  - Genus Pearsonothuria
    - Pearsonothuria graeffei

- Family Synaptidae (3 sp.)
  - Genus Euapta
    - Euapta godeffroyi
  - Genus Opheodesoma
    - Opheodesoma grisea
  - Genus Synapta
    - Synapta maculata

- Family Stichopodidae (3 sp.)
  - Genus Stichopus
    - Stichopus chloronotus
    - Stichopus herrmanni
  - Genus Thelenota
    - Thelenota ananas EN

== See also ==
- Sea cucumbers as food
- Trepanging
