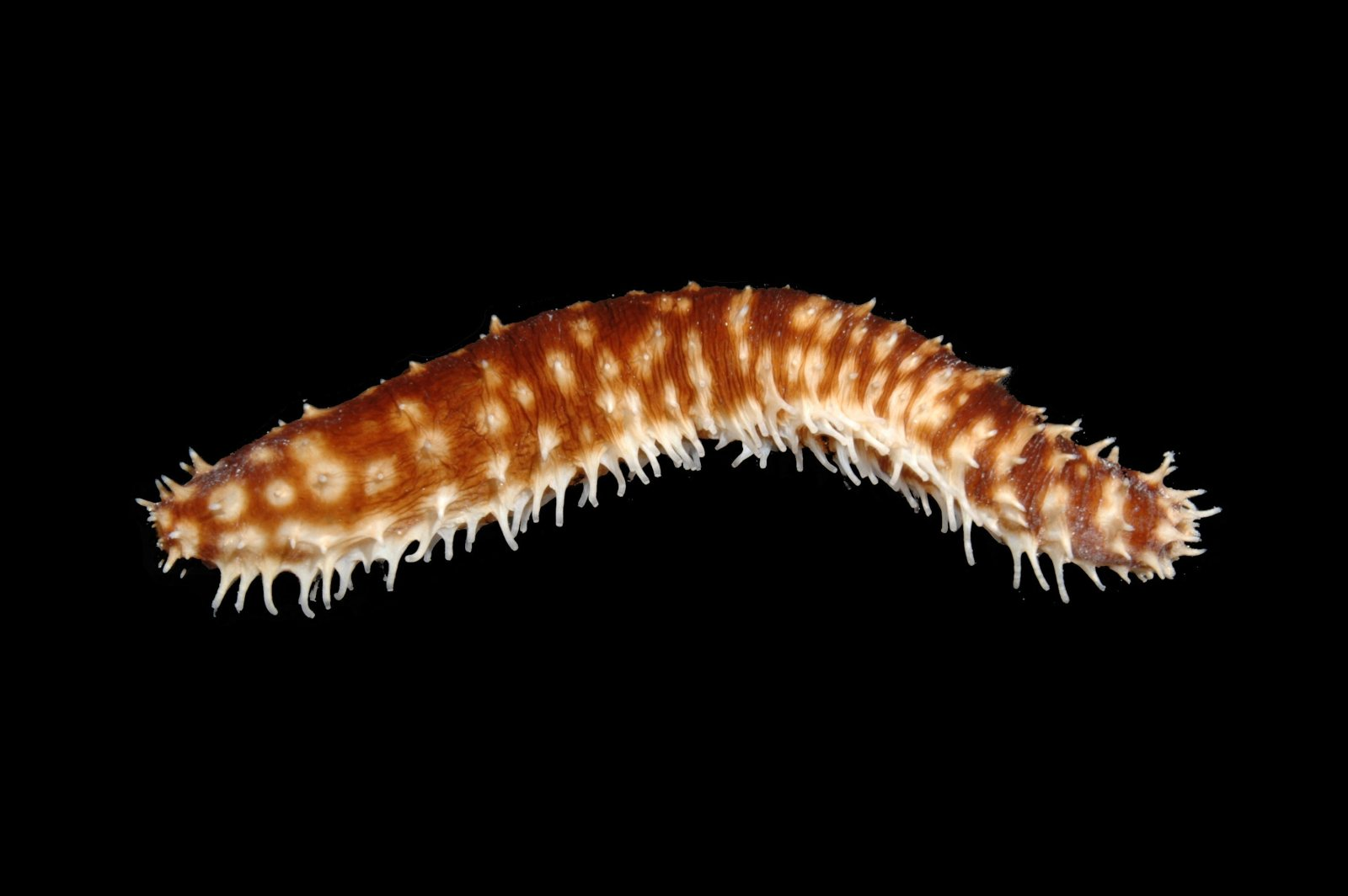

Conservation status
- Least Concern (IUCN 3.1)

Scientific classification
- Kingdom: Animalia
- Phylum: Echinodermata
- Class: Holothuroidea
- Order: Holothuriida
- Family: Holothuriidae
- Genus: Holothuria
- Subgenus: Mertensiothuria
- Species: H. hilla

Binomial name
- Holothuria hilla Lesson, 1830

Synonyms
- Holothuria decorata von Marenzeller, 1882; Holothuria fasciola Quoy & Gaimard, 1834; Holothuria fuscopunctata Quoy & Gaimard, 1834; Holothuria macleari Bell, 1884; Holothuria patagonica Perrier R., 1904; Labidodemas leucopus Haacke, 1880; Labidodemas neglectum Haacke, 1880; Stichopus gyrifer Selenka, 1867

= Holothuria hilla =

Species of sea cucumber

Holothuria hilla is a species of sea cucumber in the subgenus Mertensiothuria of the genus Holothuria. Some common names include the contractile sea cucumber, the sand sifting sea cucumber and the tigertail sea cucumber, and in Hawaii it is known as the light spotted sea cucumber. It is found in the Indo-Pacific region and the Red Sea.

== Description ==
Holothuria hilla is a cylindrical sea cucumber, tapering slightly at the posterior end. It can grow to a length of about 40 cm (16 in) and a diameter of 5 cm (2 in). The integument is thin, soft and wrinkled. The dorsal surface is covered with longitudinal rows of tube feet modified into thornlike conical papillae with broad bases, sometimes joined in pairs. These are creamy-white, in contrast to the pinkish, golden or brown background colour of the skin. The ventral surface is similar in colour but the papillae are ranged in four or five rows and are longer and yellowish. The mouth is on the underside and is surrounded by a ring of twenty, yellowish peltate tentacles. This species has Cuvierian tubules but does not expel them defensively as do some other species.

== Distribution and habitat ==
This species is found in the Red Sea, Persian Gulf and the tropical west and central Indo-Pacific oceans, as far east as Hawaii, and even Panama. It is mainly found at less than 30 m (100 ft), but occasionally as deep as 200 m (660 ft), on sandy, rocky and coral substrates, in lagoons, seagrass meadows and flat areas.

== Ecology ==
Holothuria hilla is a detritivore, raking sand into its mouth with its oral tentacles, extracting and digesting the bacteria, animal and vegetal particles, and voiding the sand through its anus. In this way it churns up significant areas of the seabed.

Reproduction is either sexual, when the male and female liberate their gametes into the water column, or asexual, by fission. Sexual reproduction mostly occurs at hotter times of year and asexual reproduction when it is cooler. In Réunion, where the species is rare, fission is the only breeding method that has been observed. The animal stops feeding and conceals itself while splitting; the missing parts regenerate and are often paler in colour than the original parts.
