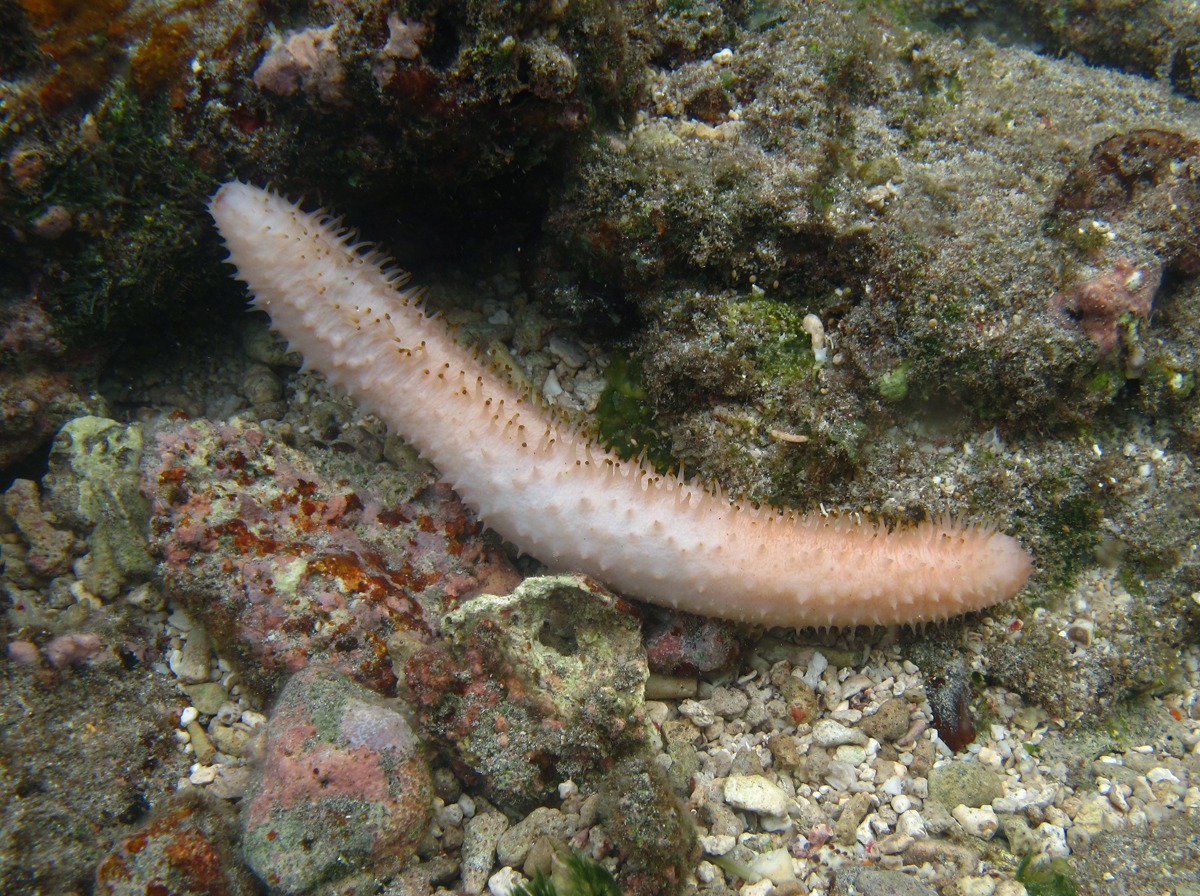
- Labidodemas pertinax

Scientific classification
- Kingdom: Animalia
- Phylum: Echinodermata
- Class: Holothuroidea
- Order: Holothuriida
- Family: Holothuriidae
- Genus: Labidodemas; Selenka, 1867

Species
- 8 species (see text)

Synonyms
- Holothuria (Irenothuria) Deichmann, 1958; Irenothuria Deichmann, 1958

= Labidodemas =

Genus of sea cucumber

Labidodemas is a genus of marine sea cucumbers in the family Holothuriidae. The genus was erected by Emil Selenka in 1867.

== Species ==
The World Register of Marine Species recognises the following species:

- Labidodemas americanum Deichmann, 1938
- Labidodemas maccullochi (Deichmann, 1958)
- Labidodemas pertinax (Ludwig, 1875)
- Labidodemas pseudosemperianum Massin, Samyn & Thandar, 2004
- Labidodemas quadripartitum Massin, Samyn & Thandar, 2004
- Labidodemas rugosum (Ludwig, 1875)
- Labidodemas semperianum Selenka, 1867
- Labidodemas spineum Massin, Samyn & Thandar, 2004
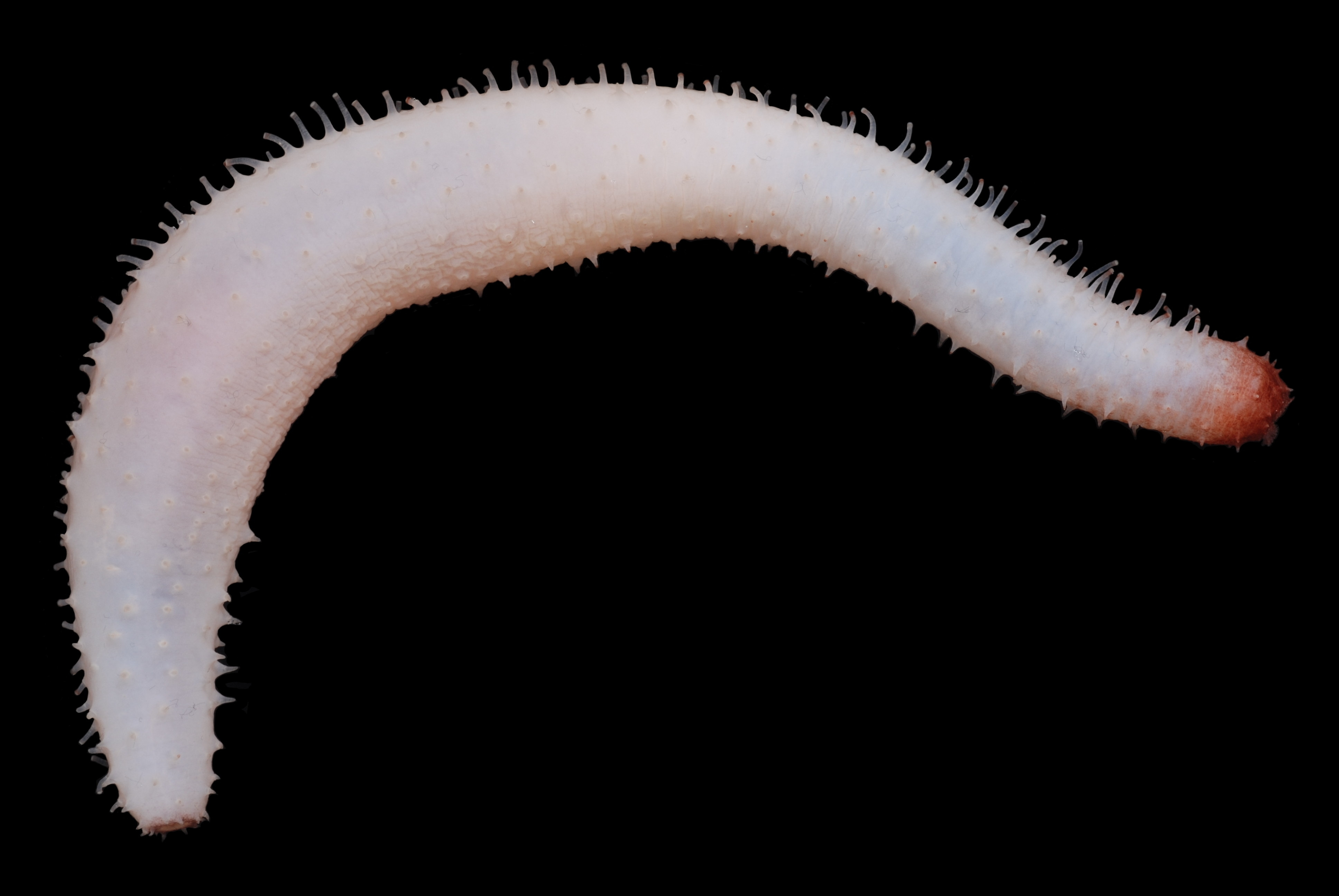
Labidodemas pertinax

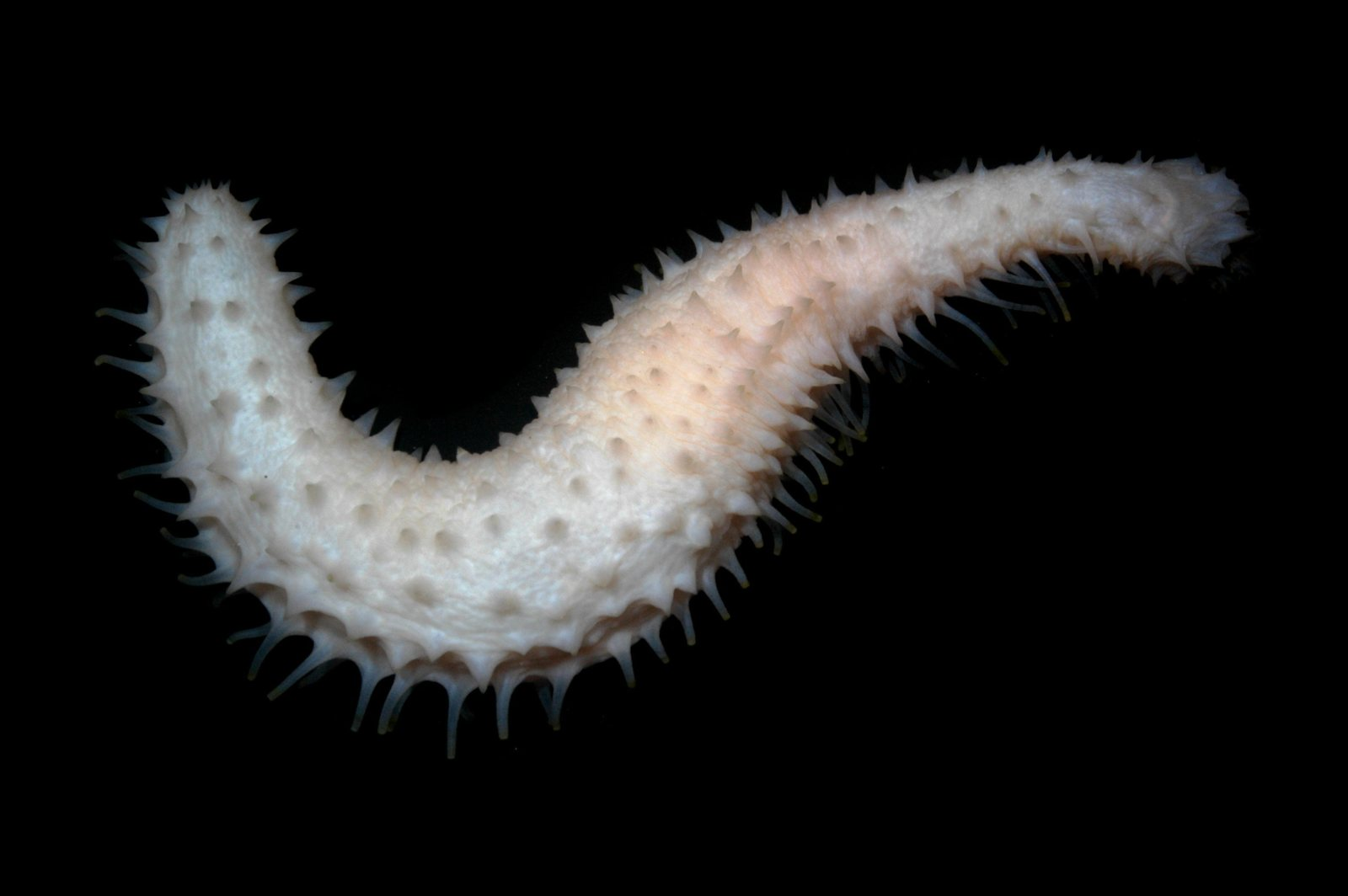
Labidodemas rugosum

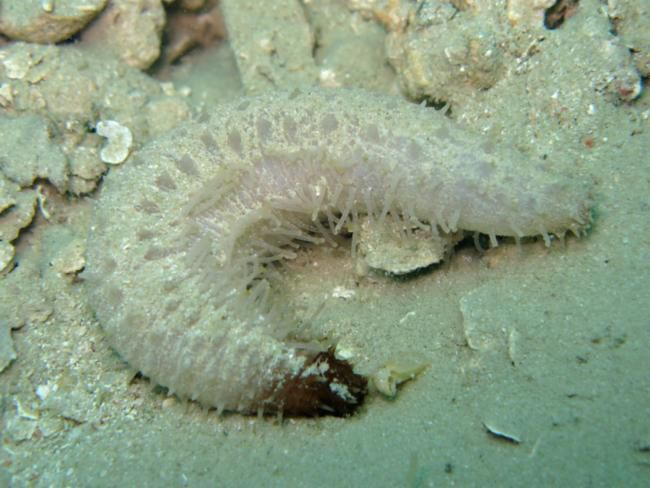
Labidodemas semperianum
