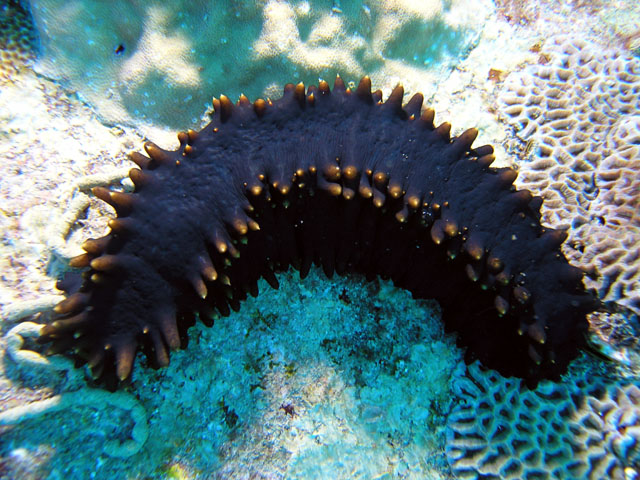

Conservation status
- Least Concern (IUCN 3.1)

Scientific classification
- Kingdom: Animalia
- Phylum: Echinodermata
- Class: Holothuroidea
- Order: Synallactida
- Family: Stichopodidae
- Genus: Stichopus
- Species: S. chloronotus

Binomial name
- Stichopus chloronotus Brandt, 1835

Synonyms
- Holothuria quadrangularis Lesson, 1830; Holothuria viridis Quoy & Gaimard, 1952; Stichopus chloronotos Brandt, 1835; Stichopus chloronotus fuscus Pearson, 1903; Stichopus cylindricus Haacke, 1880; Stichopus hirotai Mitsukuri, 1912

= Stichopus chloronotus =

Species of sea cucumber

Stichopus chloronotus is a species of sea cucumber. Common names include the greenfish sea cucumber, the spiky sea cucumber and the black knobby sea cucumber. It is native to the Indo-Pacific region. It has a wide range and is abundant and the IUCN lists it as being of "Least Concern".

== Description ==
Stichopus chloronotus is a fairly large species growing to about 25 cm (10 in) with a firm but pliable body and a squarish cross section. The skin is smooth but there are numerous conical fleshy papillae in longitudinal rows, and these are larger on the lower lateral angles. This sea cucumber is a deep blackish-green in colour, and has yellow or red tips to the papillae.

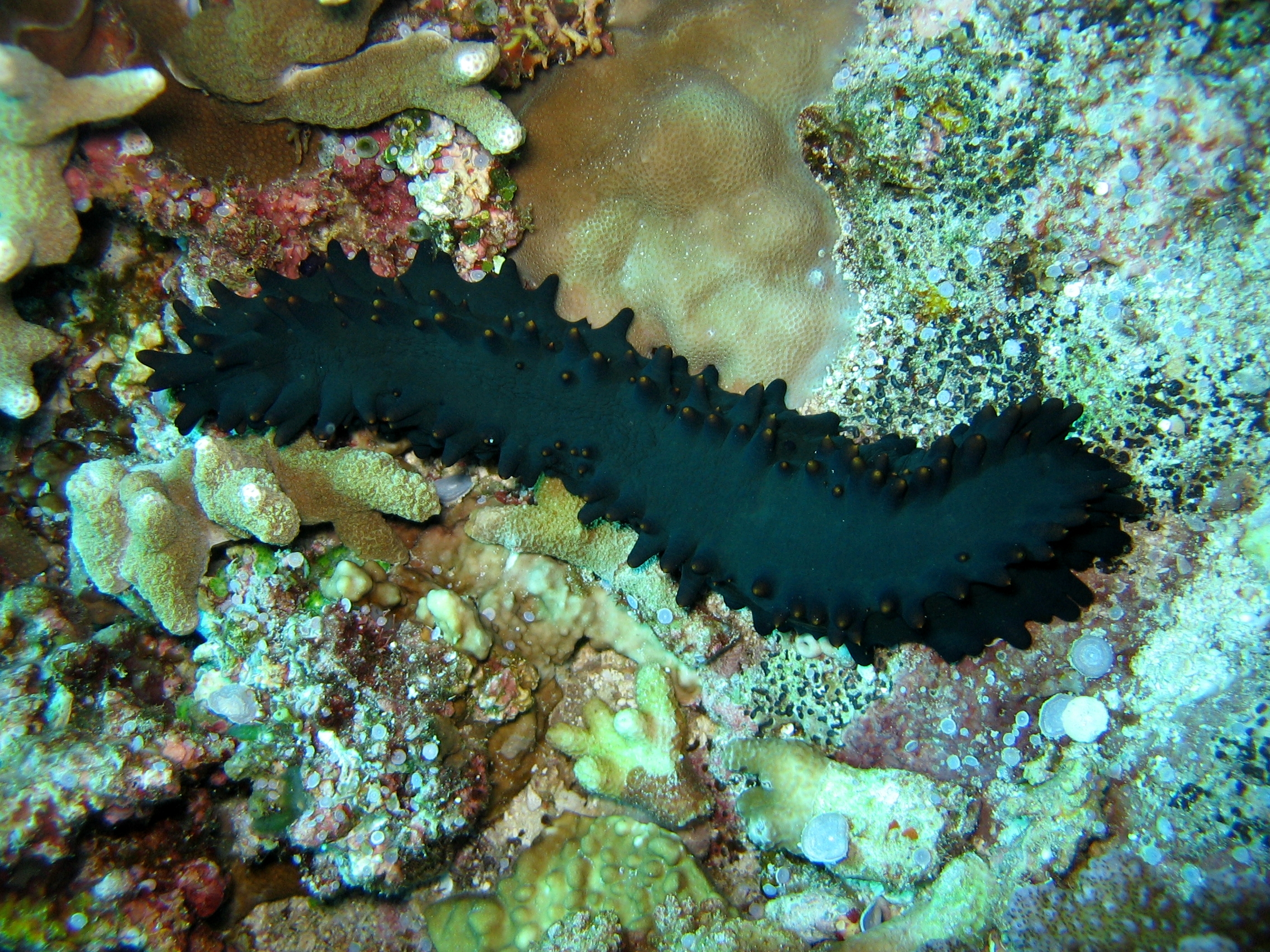

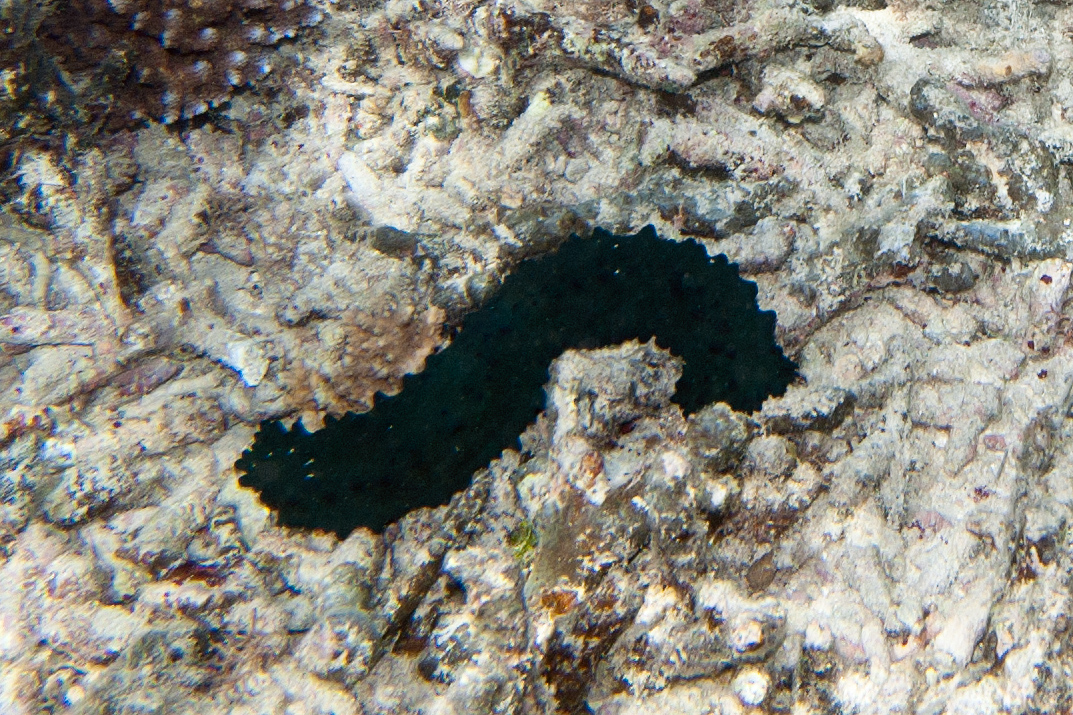

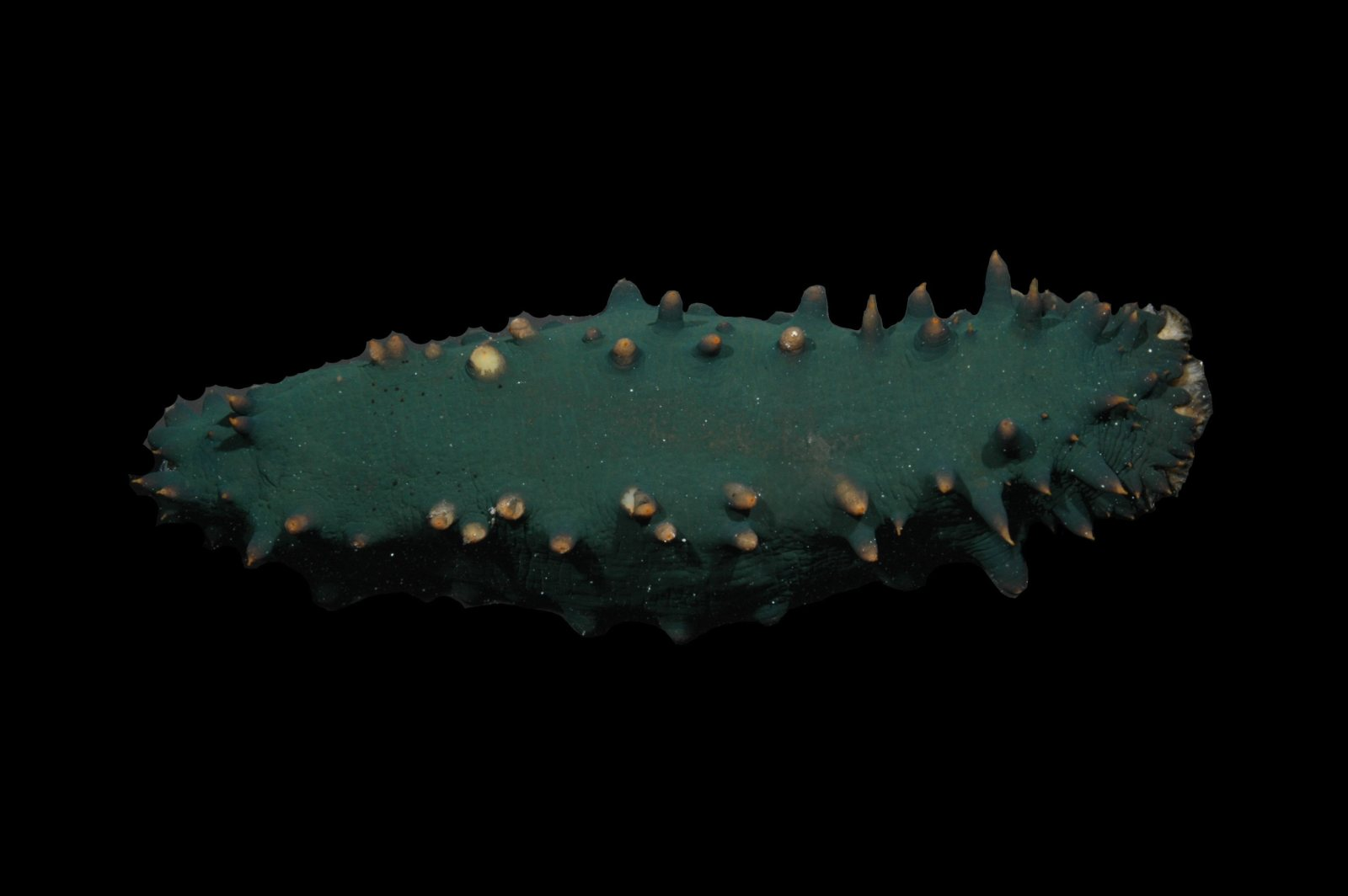

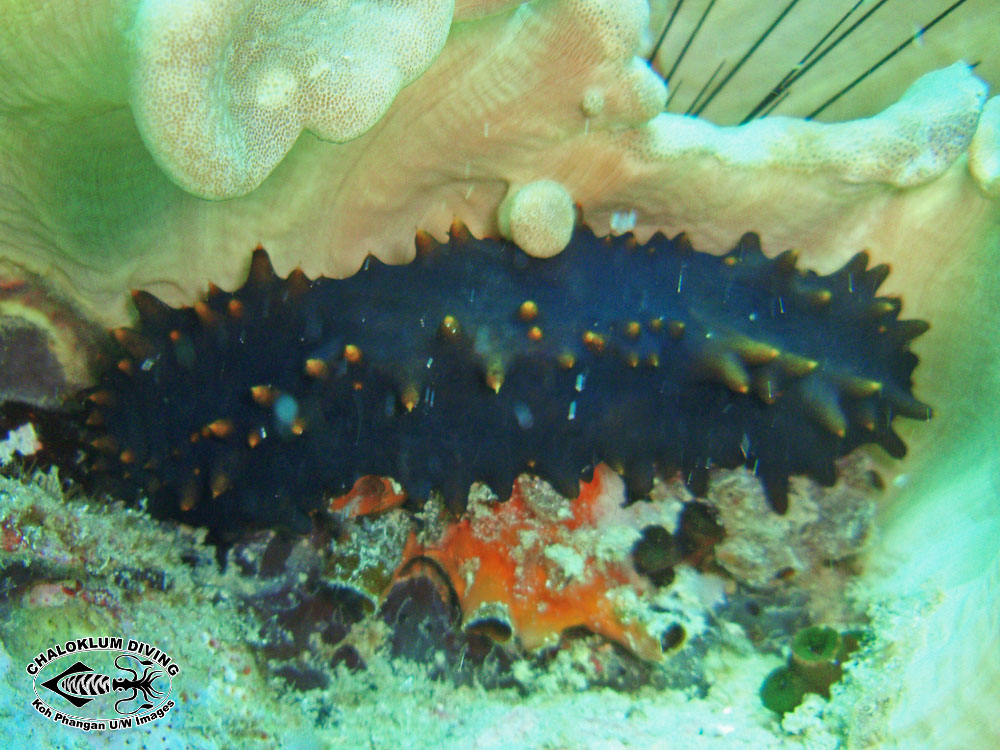
Some specimens can be blueish

== Distribution and habitat ==
Stichopus chloronotus is native to the Indo-Pacific. Its range extends from the Red Sea and the East Coast of Africa, through Madagascar, the Seychelles, the Comores and Réunion to Australia, Indonesia, China, Japan, Guam, Fiji, Tonga and Samoa. It lives on reefs, but can also be found on rubble located on the outer reef flats at depths down to about 12 m (39 ft).

== Biology ==
Stichopus chloronotus is a detritivore and sifts through the sediment on the seabed with its tentacles and feeds on detritus and other organic matter including plant and animal remains, bacteria, protozoa, diatoms and faeces. In the process it swallows a lot of sand and plays an important part in churning up and aerating the seabed.

Stichopus chloronotus can reproduce asexually by undergoing transverse fission, forming two new individuals which each regenerate the missing parts. It can also reproduce sexually.

== Status ==
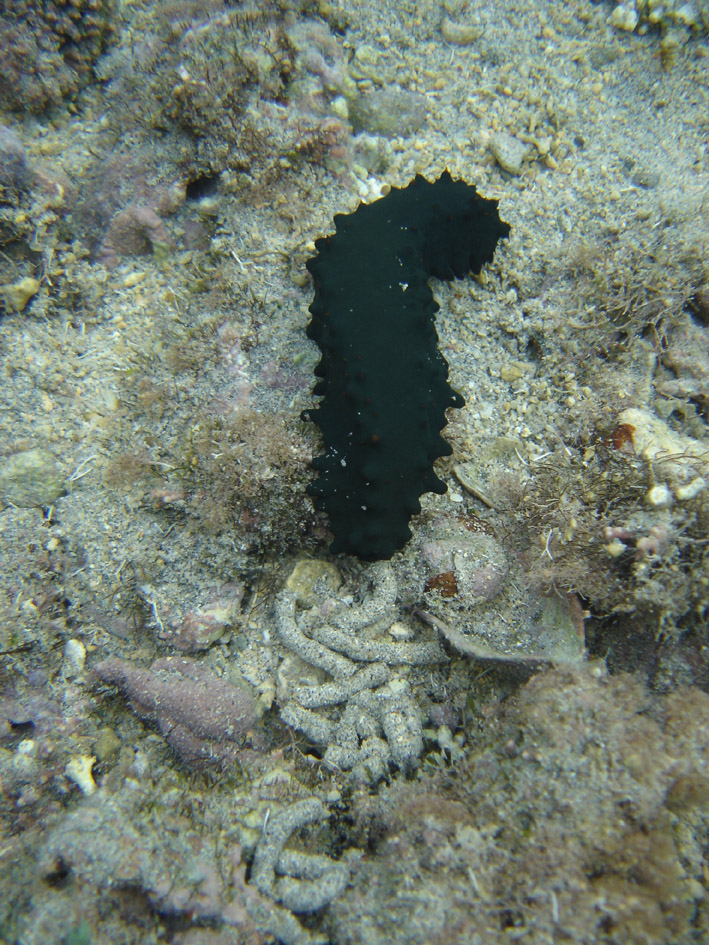
Stichopus chloronotus processes a lot of sand

Stichopus chloronotus is gathered for human consumption across much of its range. Although not one of the most important species for this purpose, it resembles the much-favoured Japanese sea cucumber Apostichopus japonicus and is increasingly being caught in some areas as supplies of that species dwindle. This species has a widespread distribution and is common in many parts of its range so the IUCN lists it as being of "Least Concern". It is also known to occur in several protected areas, including the Dr. K.K. Mohammed Koya Sea Cucumber Conservation Reserve in Lakshadweep, India.
