= Cuvierian tubules =

Tubes found in some sea cucumbers

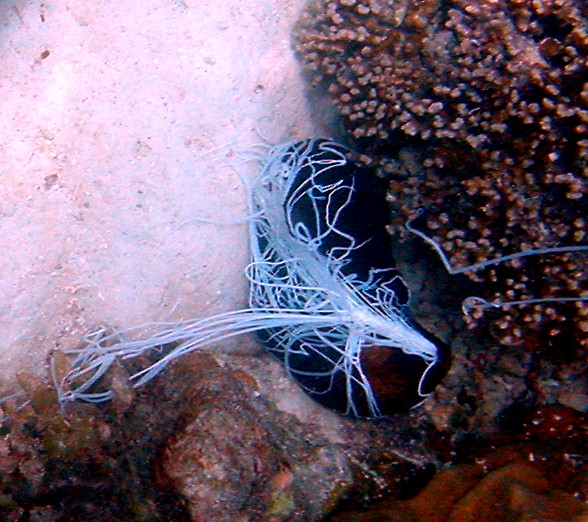
Sea cucumber emitting Cuvierian tubules

Cuvierian tubules are clusters of fine tubes located at the base of the respiratory tree in some sea cucumbers in the genera Bohadschia, Holothuria and Pearsonothuria, all of which are included in the family Holothuriidae. The tubules can be discharged through the anus when the sea cucumber is stressed. They lengthen when they come into contact with seawater and become adhesive when they encounter objects, functioning as a form of defense against predators or sources of danger.

Cuverian tubules are named after the French zoologist Georges Cuvier, who first described them.

== Mode of action ==
There may be several hundred Cuvierian tubules which are attached to the left respiratory tree and lie freely in the coelomic fluid in the body cavity.

When stressed, the sea cucumber faces away from the attacker and contracts its body wall muscles sharply. This causes the wall of the cloaca to tear and the anus to gape and the free ends of some of the tubes to be ejected. Water from the respiratory tree is forced into these tubules causing a rapid expansion and they elongate by up to 20 times their original length. They have great tensile strength and become sticky when they encounter any object. The adhesive is unique among marine invertebrates and a firm grip is obtained in under ten seconds. The mass of threads can entangle and immobilize potential predators such as small fish or crabs. The threads become detached from the sea cucumber which crawls away. The tubules contain a toxic saponin called holothurin, which is also present in the body wall in some sea cucumber species.

Cuverian tubules are readily regenerated, a process that takes about 17 days in Holothuria leucospilota and five weeks in Holothuria forskali.

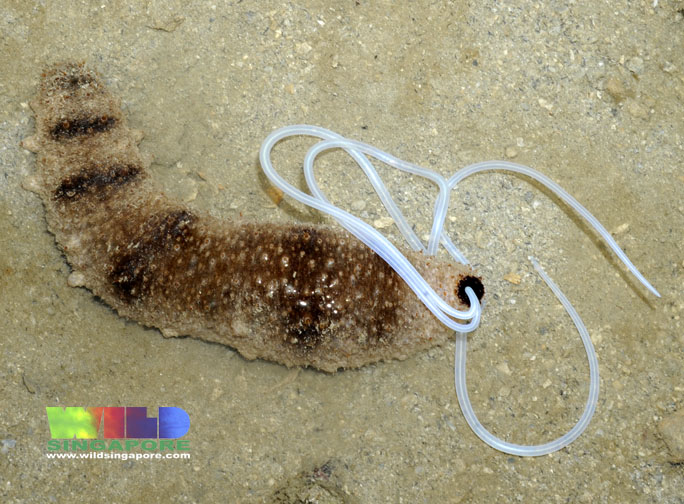
Holothuria fuscocinerea

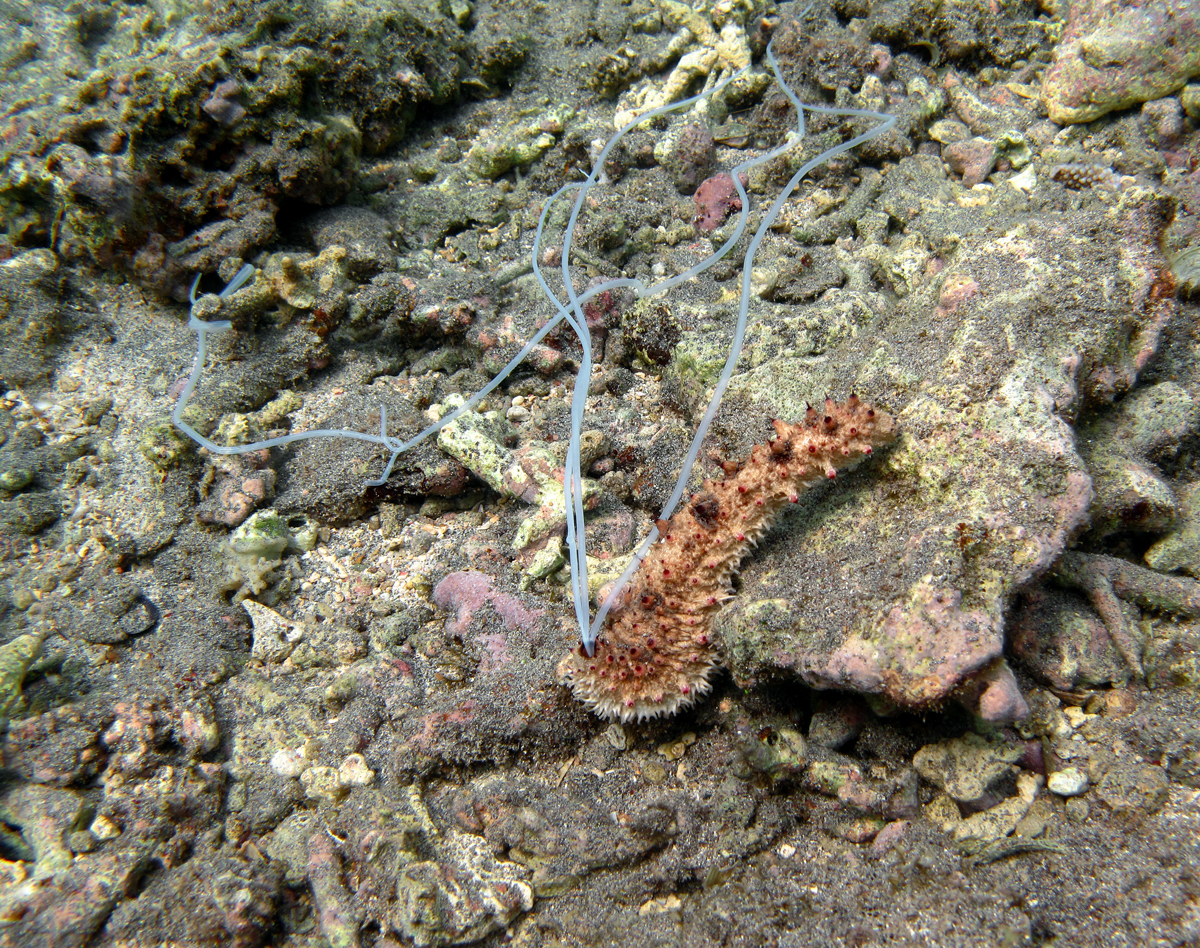
Holothuria pervicax

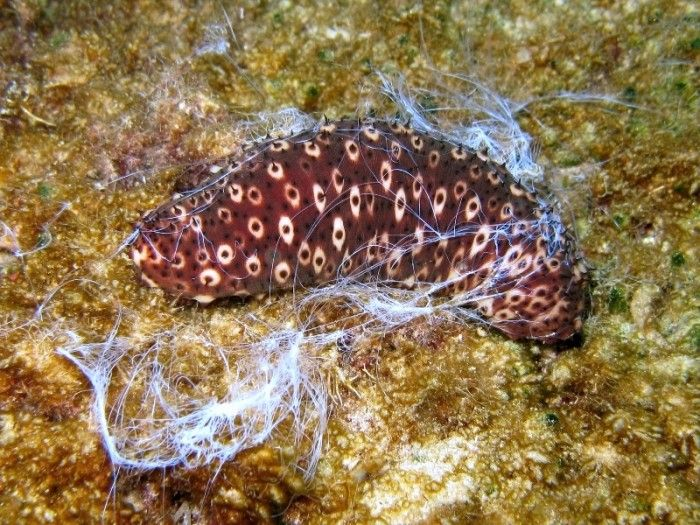
Holothuria sanctori

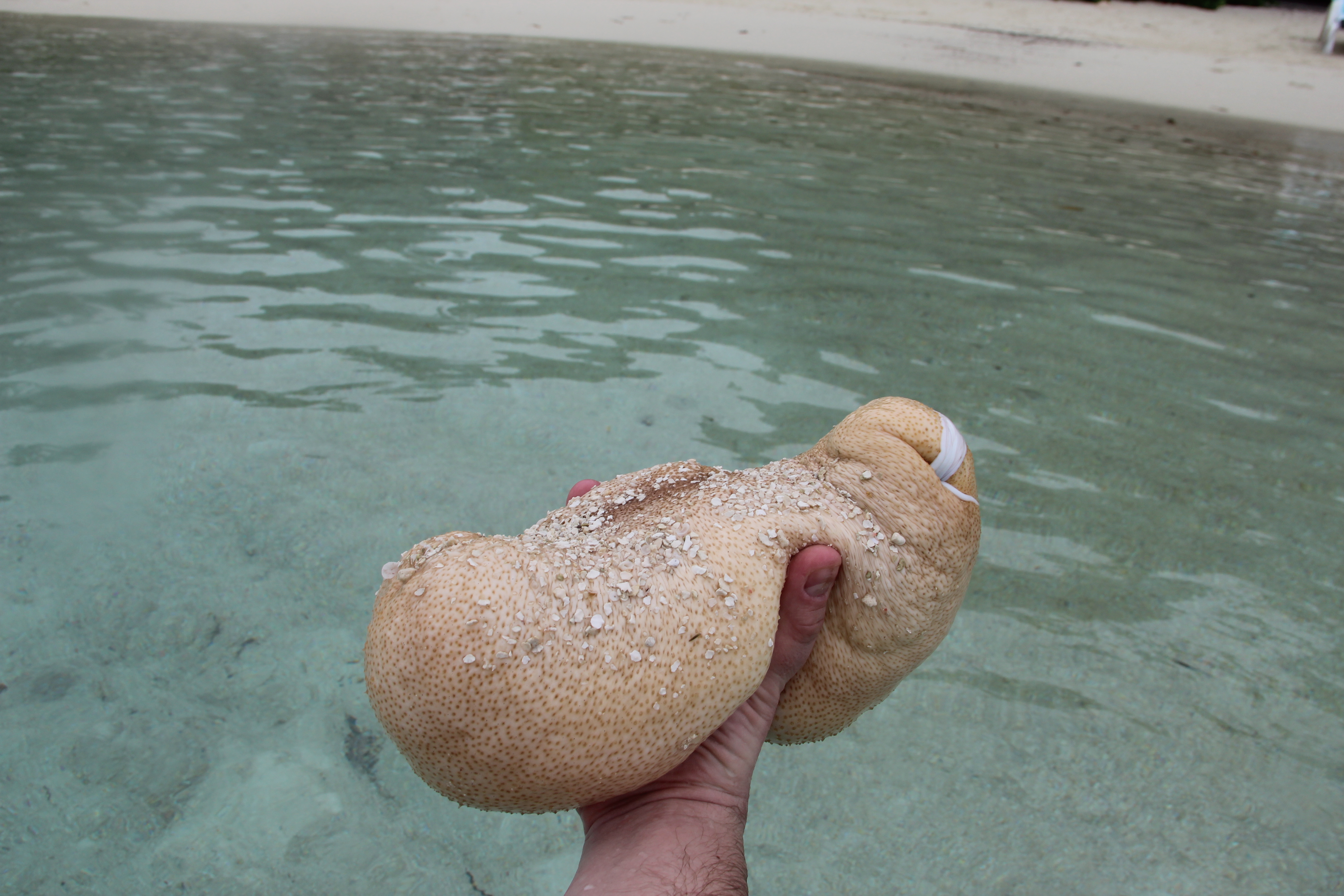
Bohadschia vitiensis held in hand out of the water

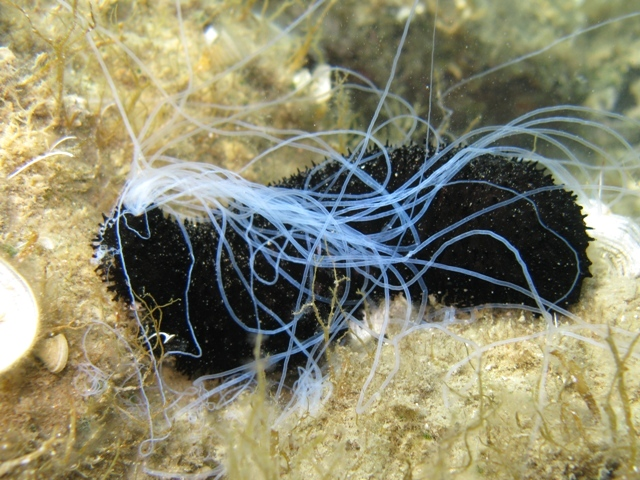
Holothuria forskali

== See also ==
- Evisceration (autotomy)
