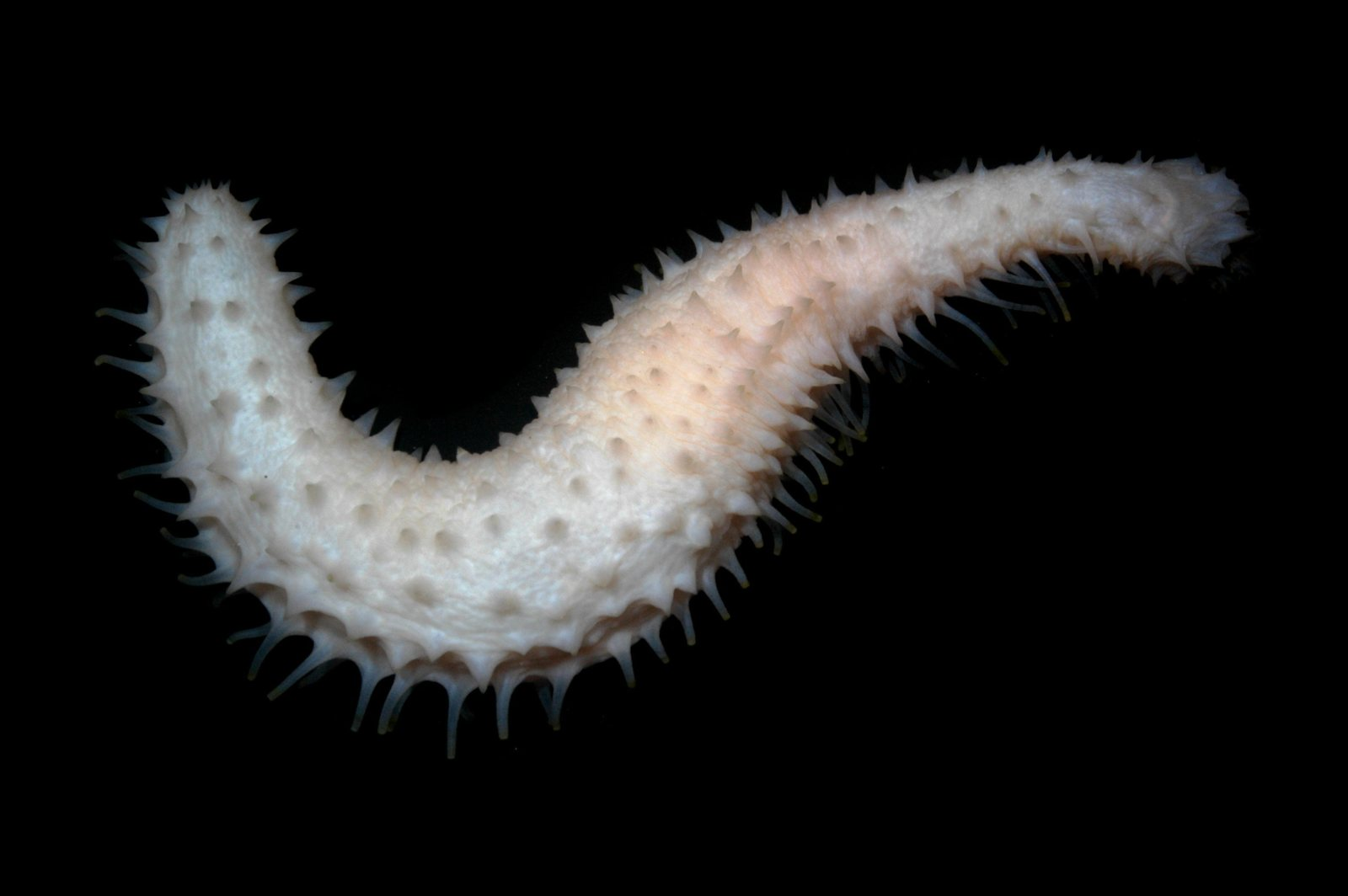

Conservation status
- Least Concern (IUCN 3.1)

Scientific classification
- Kingdom: Animalia
- Phylum: Echinodermata
- Class: Holothuroidea
- Order: Holothuriida
- Family: Holothuriidae
- Genus: Labidodemas
- Species: L. rugosum

Binomial name
- Labidodemas rugosum (Ludwig, 1875)

Synonyms
- Holothuria rugosa Ludwig, 1875; Holothuria triremis Sluiter, 1901

= Labidodemas rugosum =

Species of sea cucumber

Labidodemas rugosum is a species of sea cucumber in the family Holothuriidae. It is native to the tropical Indo-Pacific region.

== Description ==
Labidodemas rugosum has a distinctive white-pink hue. It is covered in long pinkish-white papillae.

== Distribution and habitat ==
Labidodemas rugosum is found off the coasts of Asia and Africa, in the tropical Indian Ocean and the western Pacific Ocean. Its range extends from the Red Sea, the east coast of Africa and Madagascar, to India and the Maldives, to Indonesia, northern Australia, the Philippines, Malaysia, New Guinea and other island groups in the western Pacific.

Labidodemas rugosum is a reef-associated species, and is commonly found embedded in sand underneath stony corals. It lives in the eulittoral zone, between 0–5 m (0–16 ft) underwater.

== Conservation status ==
Labidodemas rugosum is uncommon but widespread throughout the Indo-Pacific, and not widely fished throughout its range. Due to this, the International Union for Conservation of Nature has assessed the conservation status of this sea cucumber as least concern.
