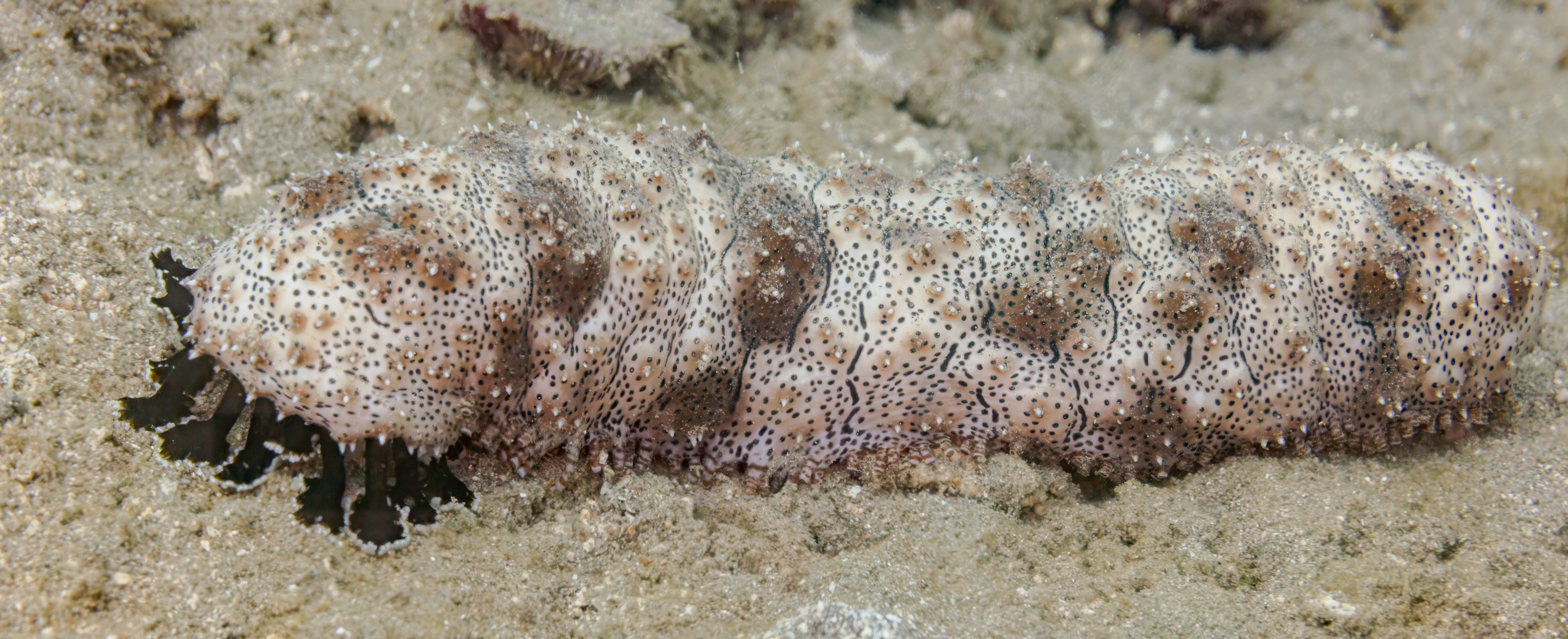
- Pearsonothuria graeffei in the Philippines

Conservation status
- Least Concern (IUCN 3.1)

Scientific classification
- Kingdom: Animalia
- Phylum: Echinodermata
- Class: Holothuroidea
- Order: Holothuriida
- Family: Holothuriidae
- Genus: Pearsonothuria; Levin, 1984
- Species: P. graeffei

Binomial name
- Pearsonothuria graeffei Semper, 1868

Synonyms
- Bohadschia drachi Cherbonnier, 1954; Bohadschia graeffei (Semper, 1868); Holothuria graffei Semper, 1868; Stichopus troschelii Müller, 1854

= Pearsonothuria =

Pearsonothuria graeffei

Genus of sea cucumbers

Pearsonothuria is a genus of sea cucumbers in the family Holothuriidae. Pearsonothuria graeffei is the only species in the genus. Graeffe's sea cucumber is found in the tropical Indo-Pacific Ocean and the type locality is Viti Island, Fiji. It is named after Eduard Heinrich Graeffe, Semper's coworker at the Museum Godeffroy.

== Description ==
Pearsonothuria graeffei is a roughly cylindrical, thin-walled sea cucumber that grows to about 30 centimetres (12 in) in length. Its mouth, at one end, is surrounded by a ring of up to 24 leaf-like, paddle-shaped tentacles with black stalks which are black on the upper side and white beneath. The anus is at the other end of the body and there are several rows of tube feet along the underside. The colour of the adults is pale brown and white, with black speckles and small thornlike protuberances.

By contrast, the juveniles are brightly coloured, being white and blue or black, with a few large, yellow, thornlike projections. This colouration makes them closely resemble the sea slug, Phyllidia varicosa, the bright colours of which warn predators of its toxicity. The appearance of the juvenile sea cucumbers begins to change when they grow larger than the slug and the mimicry is no longer effective.

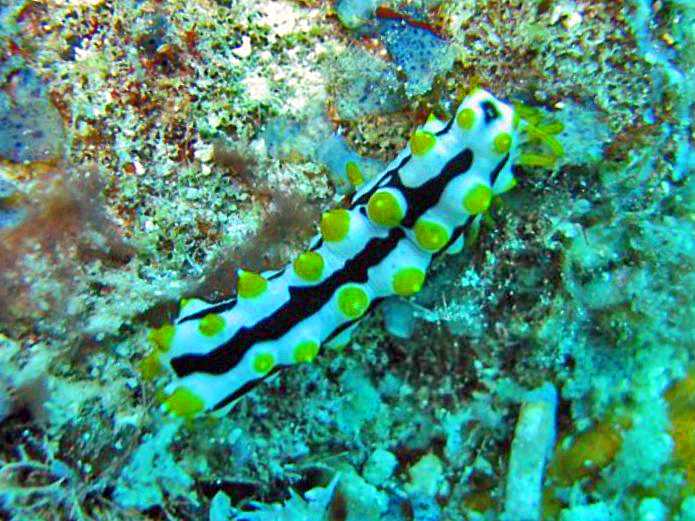
A live juvenile individual of Pearsonothuria graeffei, in situ off Madagascar

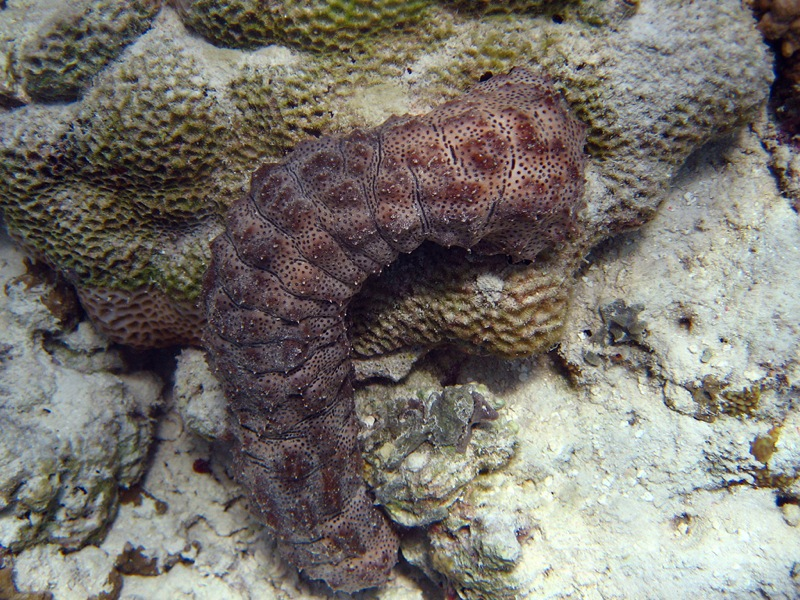
Adult specimen in the Maldives

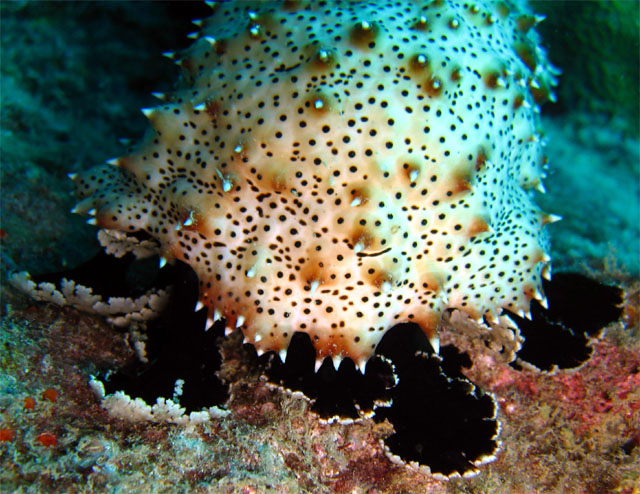
Close-up on the tentacles

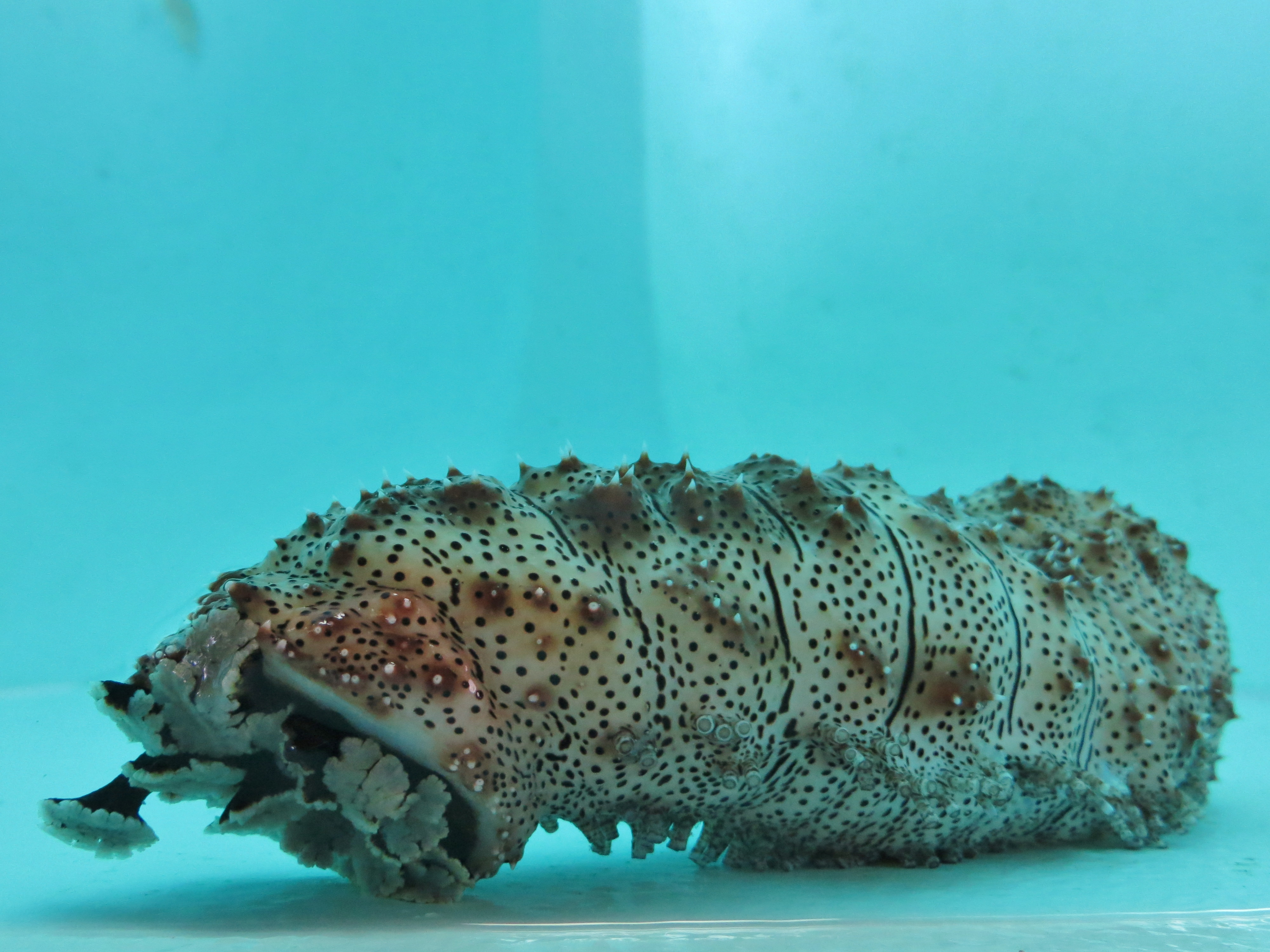

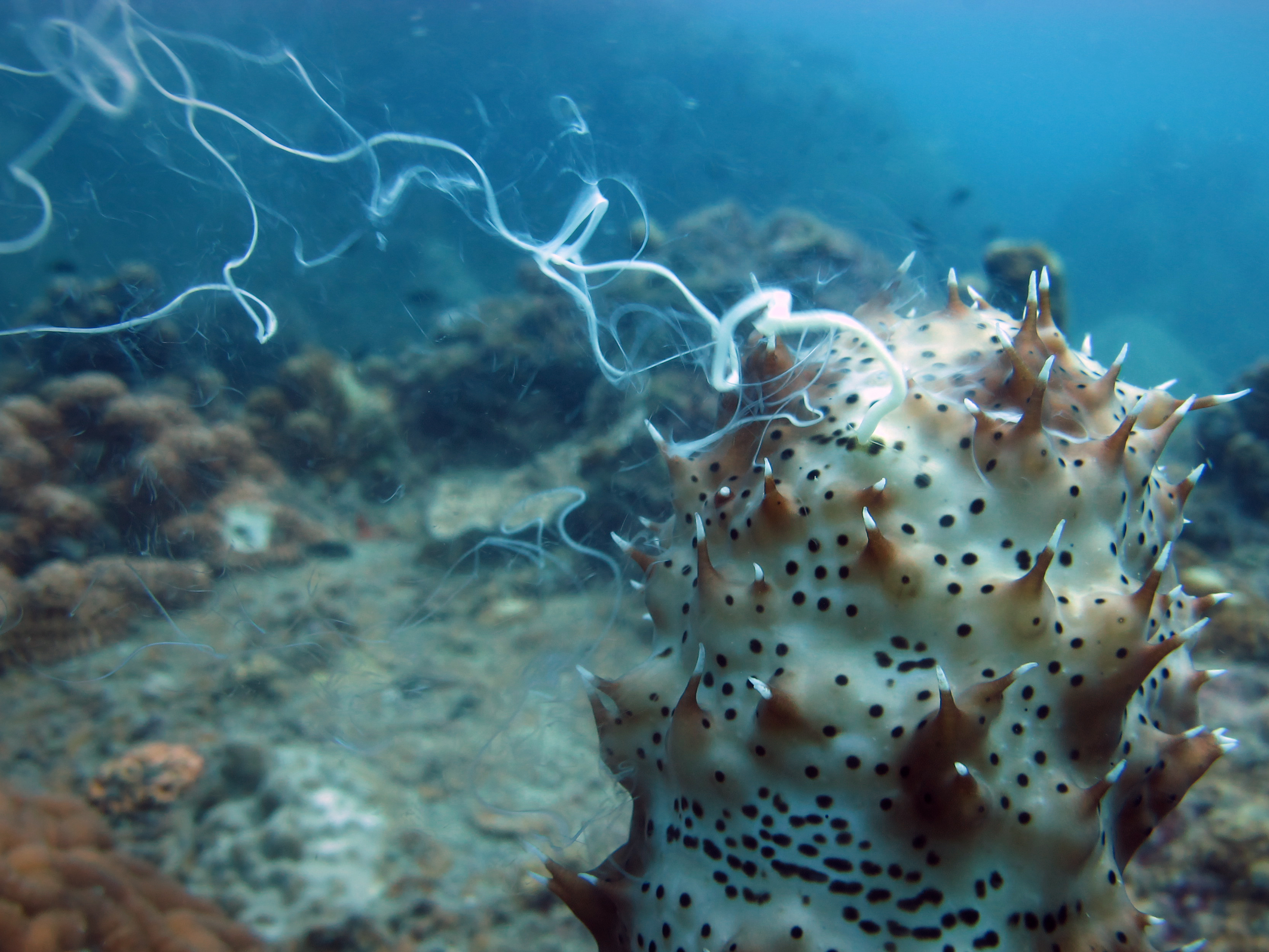
Sperm release during a mass spawning event on the island of Koh Tao, Thailand

== Distribution ==
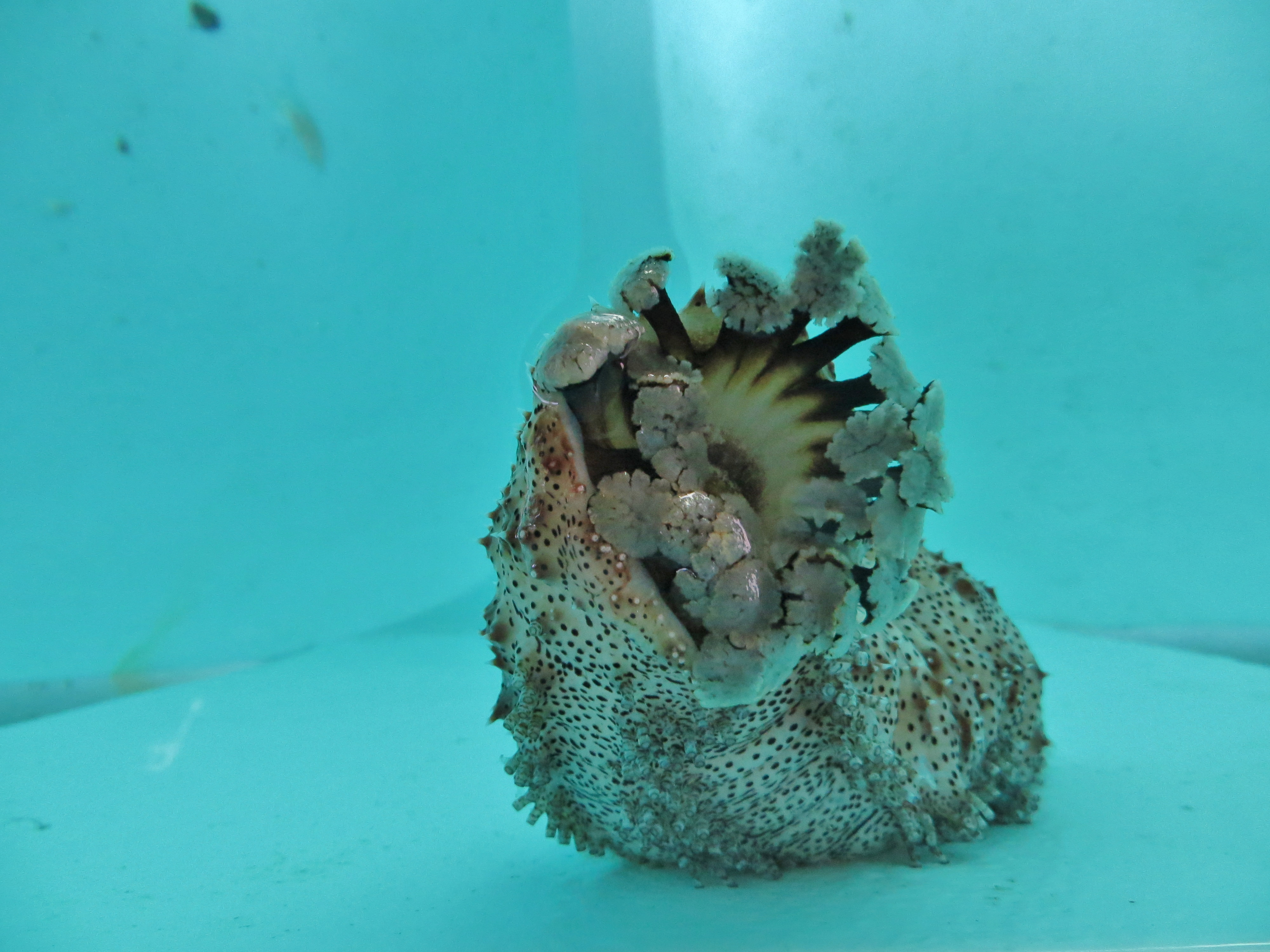

Pearsonothuria graeffei is found in tropical parts of the Indo-Pacific Ocean. The range extends from the east coast of Africa to the Philippines, Indonesia and the South Pacific. It is found on the seabed and on coral reefs at depths down to about 25 metres (82 ft).

== Biology ==
Pearsonothuria graeffei is a scavenger and roams around on the seabed sifting through the sediment with its feeding tentacles. Any organic matter it finds is passed to its mouth by the tentacles. Its daily activities start within a few minutes of dawn and continue until half an hour after sunset after which time it adopts an inactive stance with its rear end raised and its tentacles retracted into its mouth. It then remains immobile during the night. They are known to spawn simultaneously with other echinoderms, including the crown-of-thorns starfish and the sea urchin Diadema setosum.

When threatened or disturbed, many sea cucumbers eject cuvierian tubules, thin white sticky strands of viscera, from their cloacas. Pearsonothuria graeffei seems reluctant to do this except under conditions of extreme stress. The threads of this species contain glycosides that are toxic to the aggressor. The effect of these neuro-toxins is to prevent nerve impulses being transmitted, an effect similar to that produced by cocaine. The chemicals, echinoside A and ds-echinoside A, are being investigated for their possible use by humans as painkillers or anti-tumour drugs. Experiments in vitro show that they have marked anti-cancer activity in Hep G2 cells and that, when given to mice with H22 hepatocellular carcinoma tumours (liver cancer), the weight of the tumours was reduced by about 50%.
