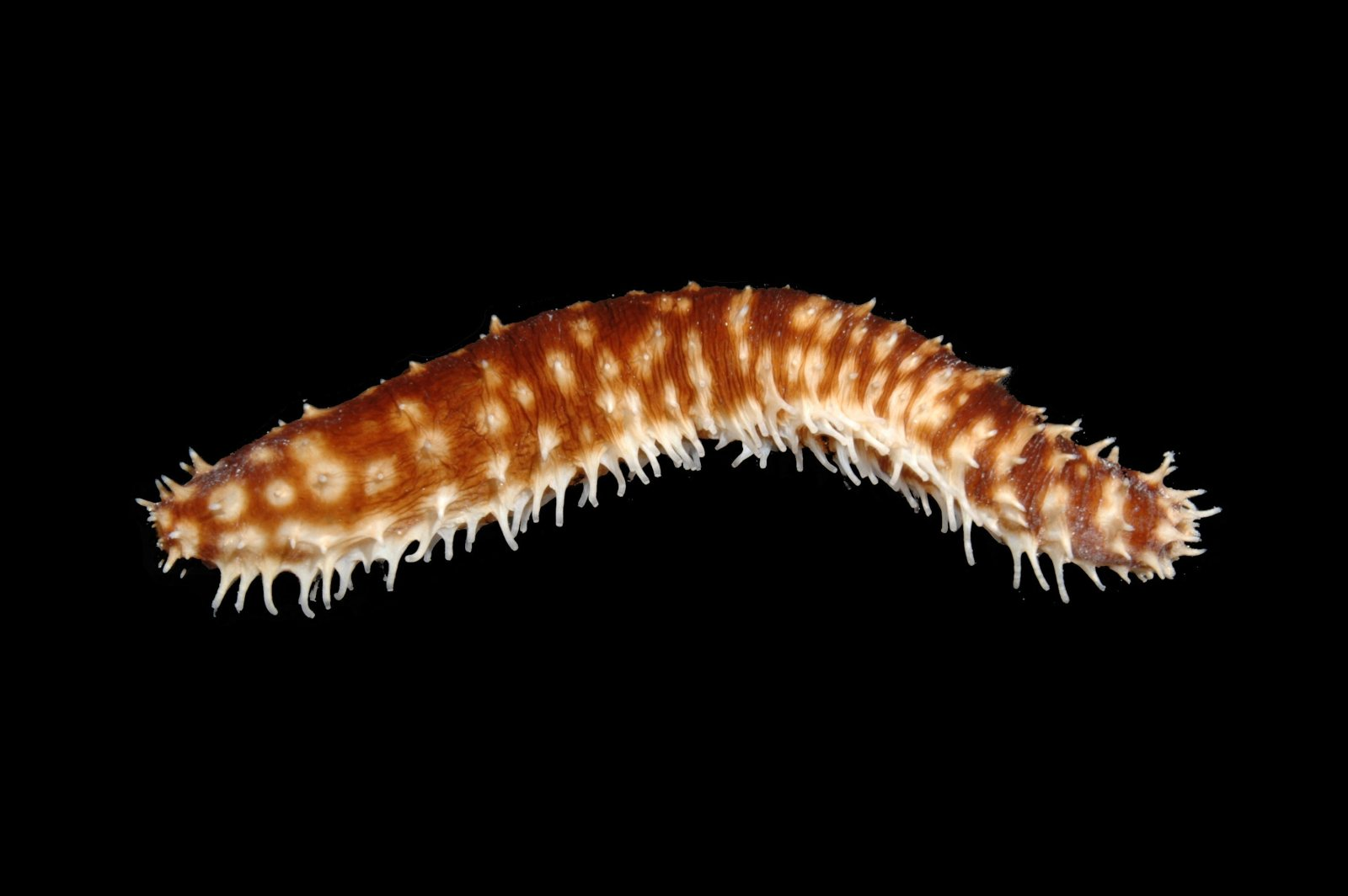
- Holothuria hilla

Scientific classification
- Kingdom: Animalia
- Phylum: Echinodermata
- Class: Holothuroidea
- Order: Holothuriida; Miller, Kerr, Paulay, Reich, Wilson, Carvajal & Rouse, 2017

Families
- Holothuriidae Burmeister, 1837; Mesothuriidae Smirnov, 2012

= Holothuriida =

Clade of sea cucumbers

Holothuriida is an order of sea cucumbers. Taxa within the order Holothuriida were previously classified in the order Aspidochirotida, which was determined to be polyphyletic in 2017. Some taxa were also reclassified into the clades Synallactida and Persiculida.

== Description and characteristics ==
Species of the order Holothuriida are distinguished from other sea cucumbers by the presence of flattened, often leaf-like tentacles, but without the other large appendages found in the related order Elasipodida. They do not have introvert or retractor muscles. The tube feet often form a clearly demarcated sole. They have 15-30 shield-shaped retractile tentacles surrounding their mouths. The body wall is thick and leathery and contains ossicles, including some table-shaped ones. They have respiratory trees for gas exchange. The mesentery of the posterior loop of their gut is attached to the right ventral interradius. The muscles that run longitudinally down the body are arranged into five double bands. They can emit sticky white threads known as cuvierian tubules from their cloacas in order to distract or entangle predators. They are usually found in exposed shallow-water environments.

== Conservation status ==
Their popularity as luxury seafood in some Asian countries poses a serious threat to the order.

== List of families ==
- Holothuriidae Burmeister, 1837 – 5 genera, over 200 species
- Mesothuriidae Smirnov, 2012 – 2 genera, 32 species
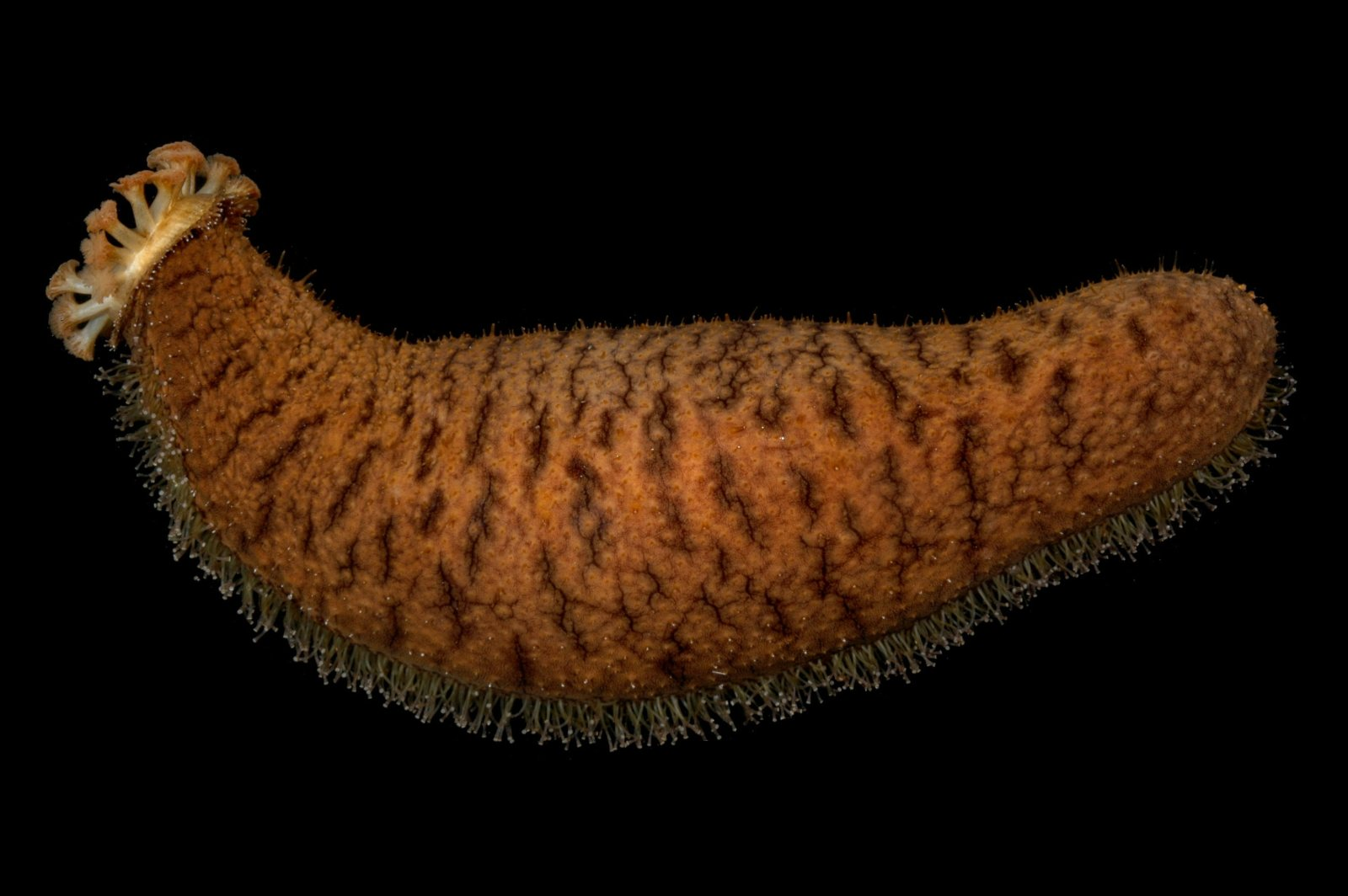
Actinopyga echinites

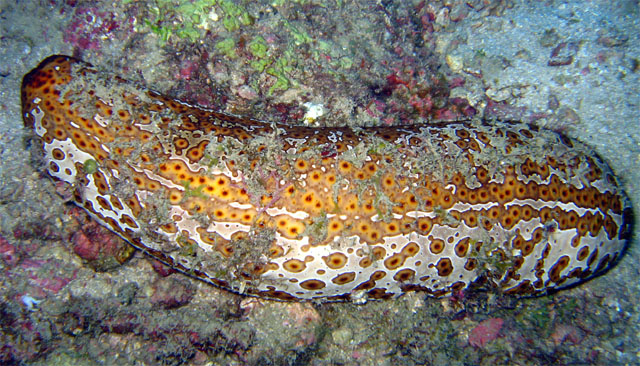
Bohadschia argus

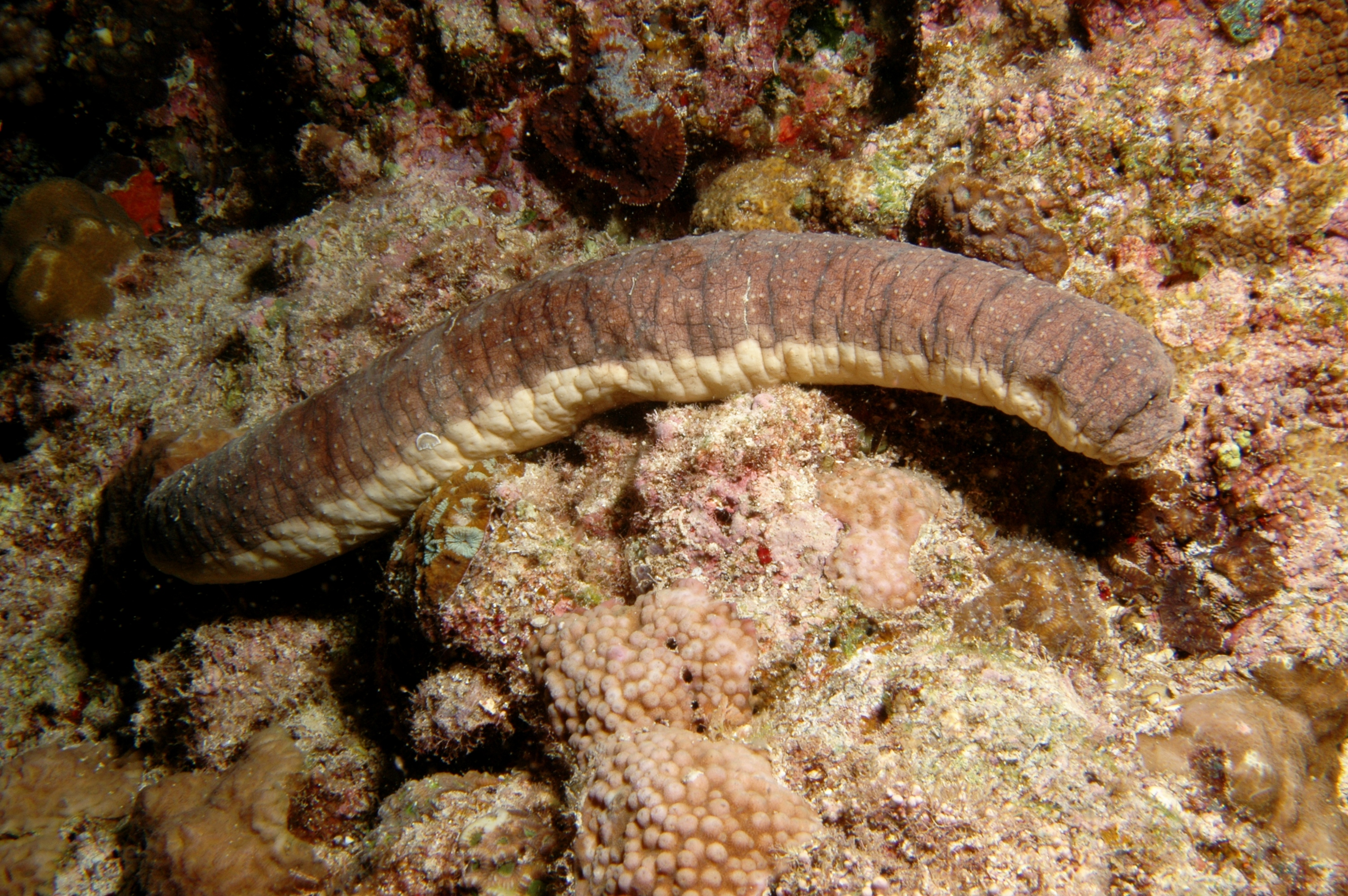
Holothuria edulis

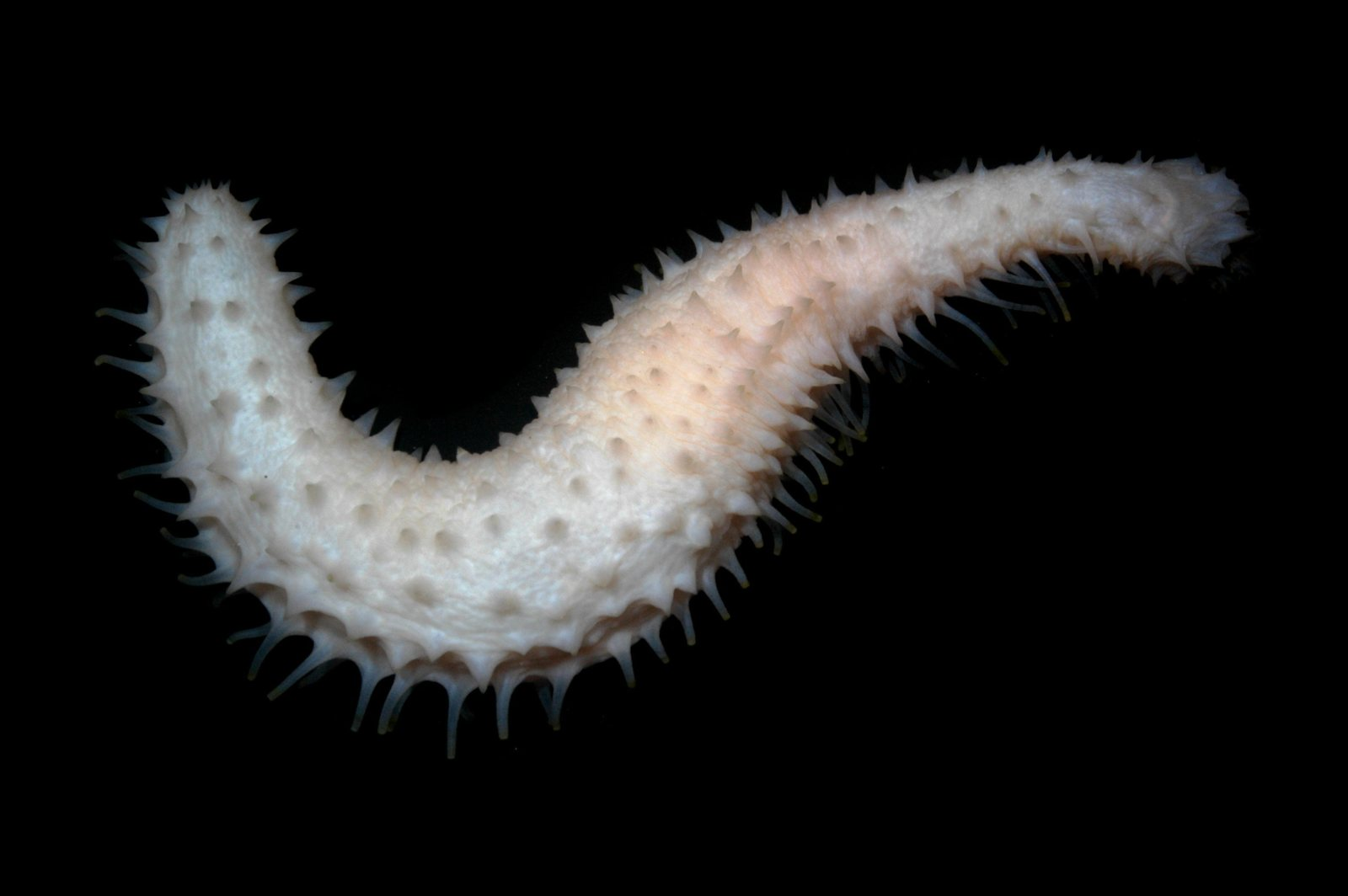
Labidodemas rugosum

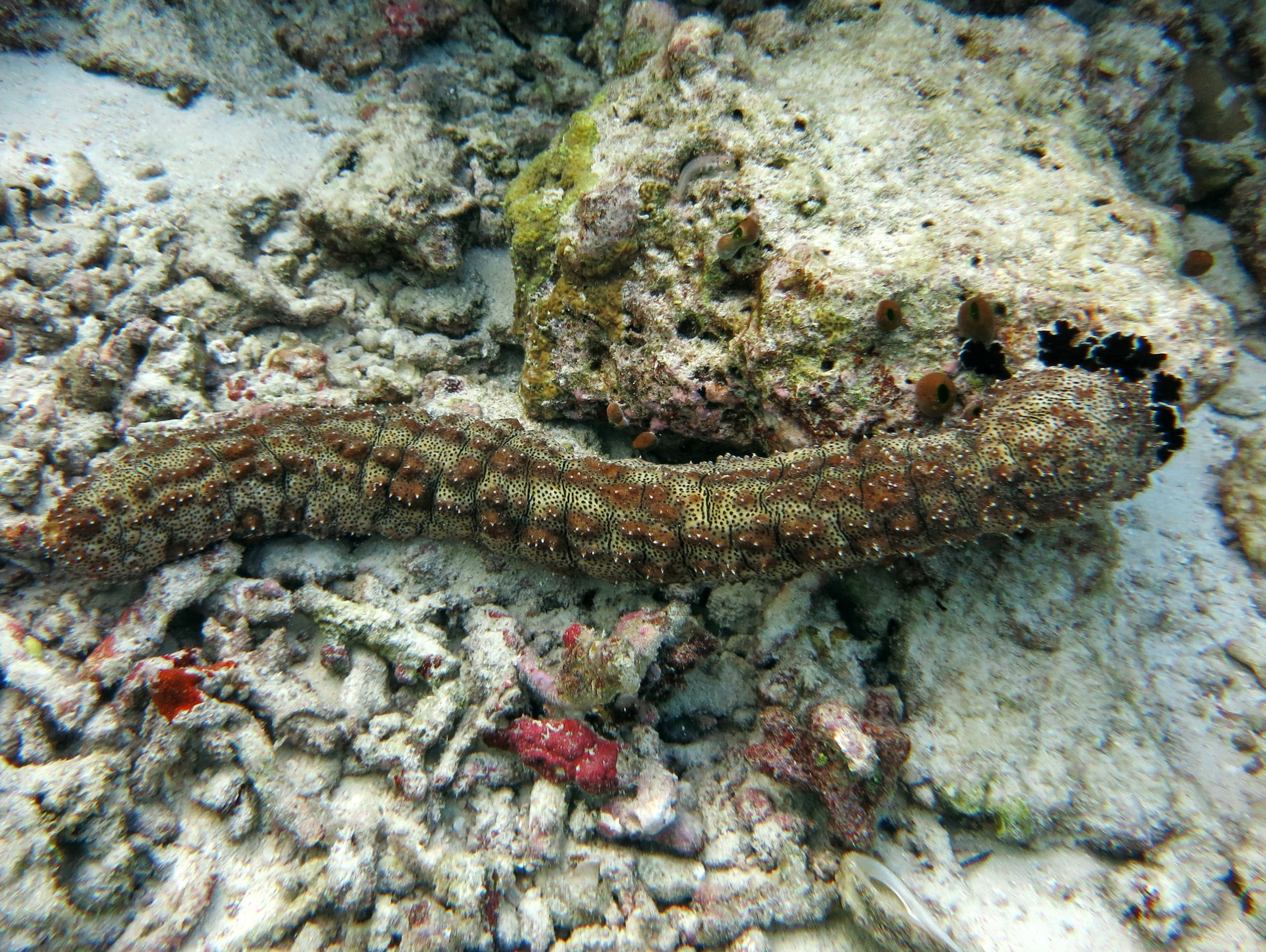
Pearsonothuria graeffei

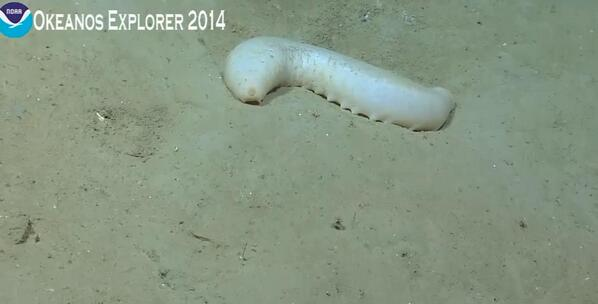
Mesothuria sp.
