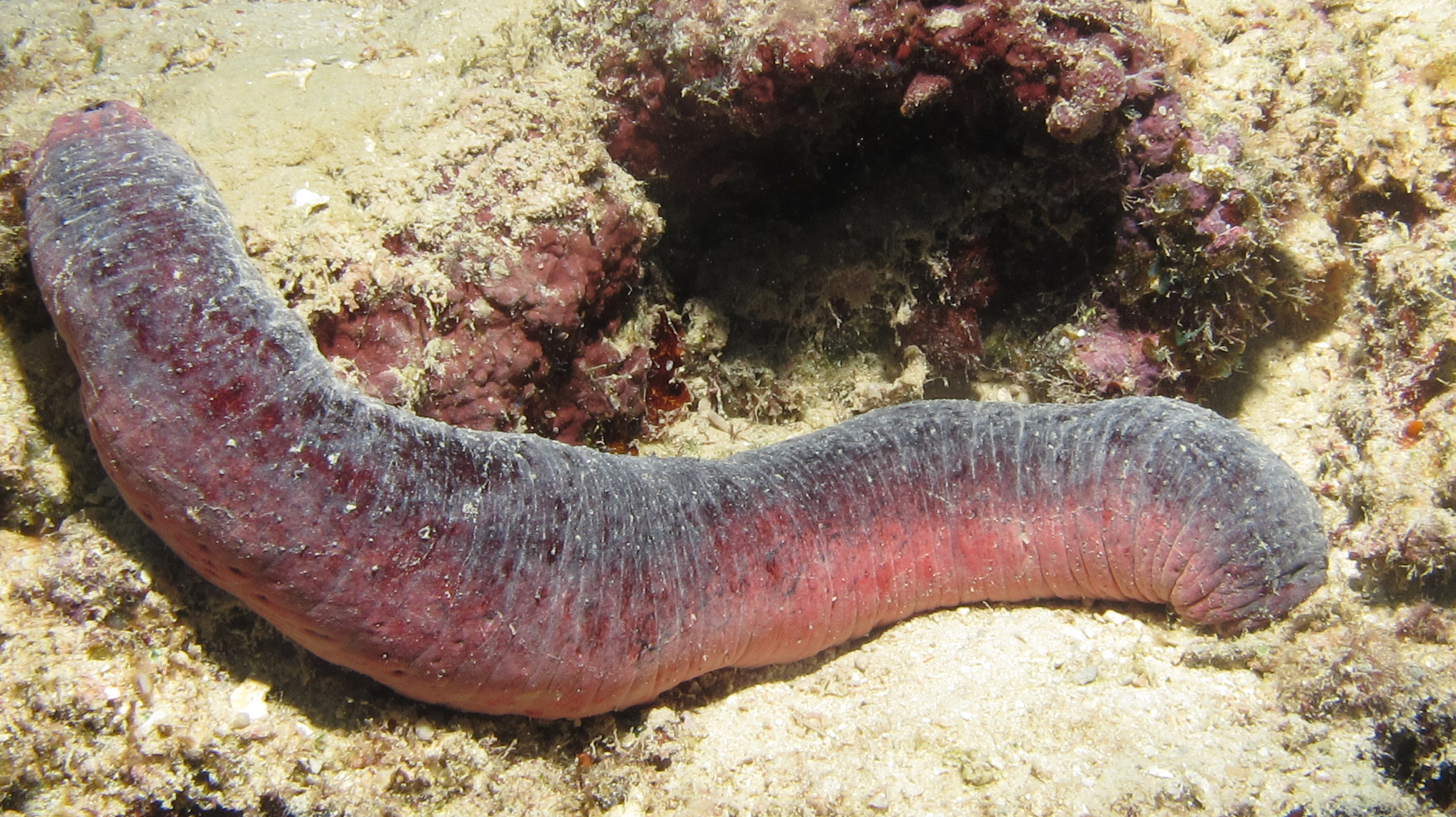

Conservation status
- Least Concern (IUCN 3.1)

Scientific classification
- Kingdom: Animalia
- Phylum: Echinodermata
- Class: Holothuroidea
- Order: Holothuriida
- Family: Holothuriidae
- Genus: Holothuria
- Subgenus: Halodeima
- Species: H. edulis

Binomial name
- Holothuria edulis Lesson, 1830

Synonyms
- Halodeima edulis (Lesson); Holothuria (Halodeima) signata Ludwig, 1875; Holothuria (Thyone) edulis Lesson, 1830; Holothuria albida Bell, 1887

= Holothuria edulis =

Species of sea cucumber

Holothuria edulis, commonly known as the edible sea cucumber or the pink and black sea cucumber, is a species of echinoderm in the family Holothuriidae. It was placed in the subgenus Halodeima by Pearson in 1914, making its full scientific name Holothuria (Halodeima) edulis. It is found in shallow water in the tropical Indo-Pacific Ocean.

== Description ==
Holothuria edulis is a medium-sized sea cucumber reaching a length of about 30 centimetres (12 in). It has a roughly cylindrical shape with rounded ends but can retract and expand its body and adopt different shapes. It is usually soft and pliable with a smooth skin but, due to the special characteristics of its connective tissue, it can become firm and rigid. The body is lined with longitudinal rows of small tube feet which can be withdrawn into the body wall, leaving small hollows. About twenty tube feet in a ring round the mouth are modified into feeding tentacles. This sea cucumber is usually a dark reddish-black colour on its upper side and a pinkish-mauve colour below, but can be grey or dark brown.

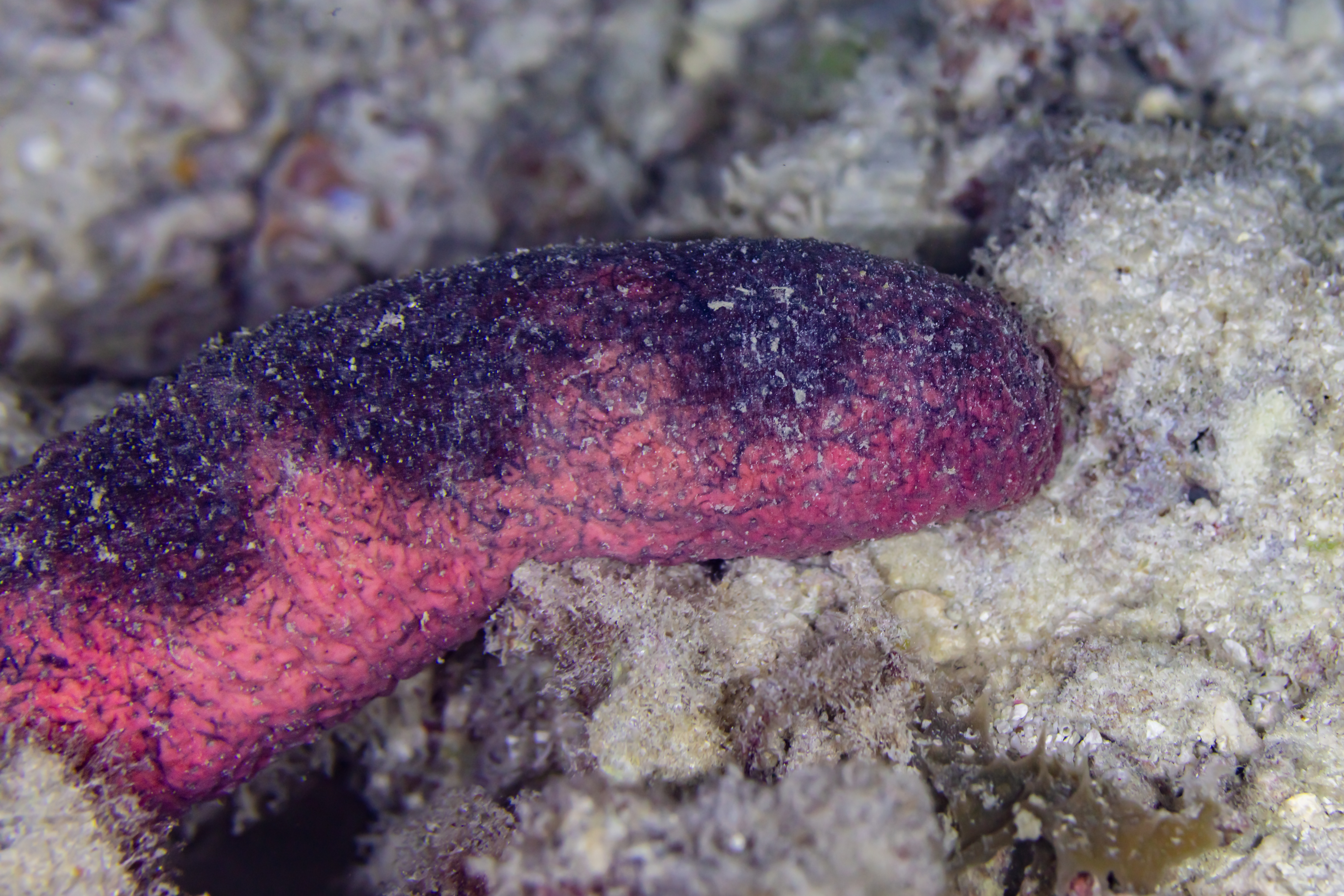
Pink form from Tanzania

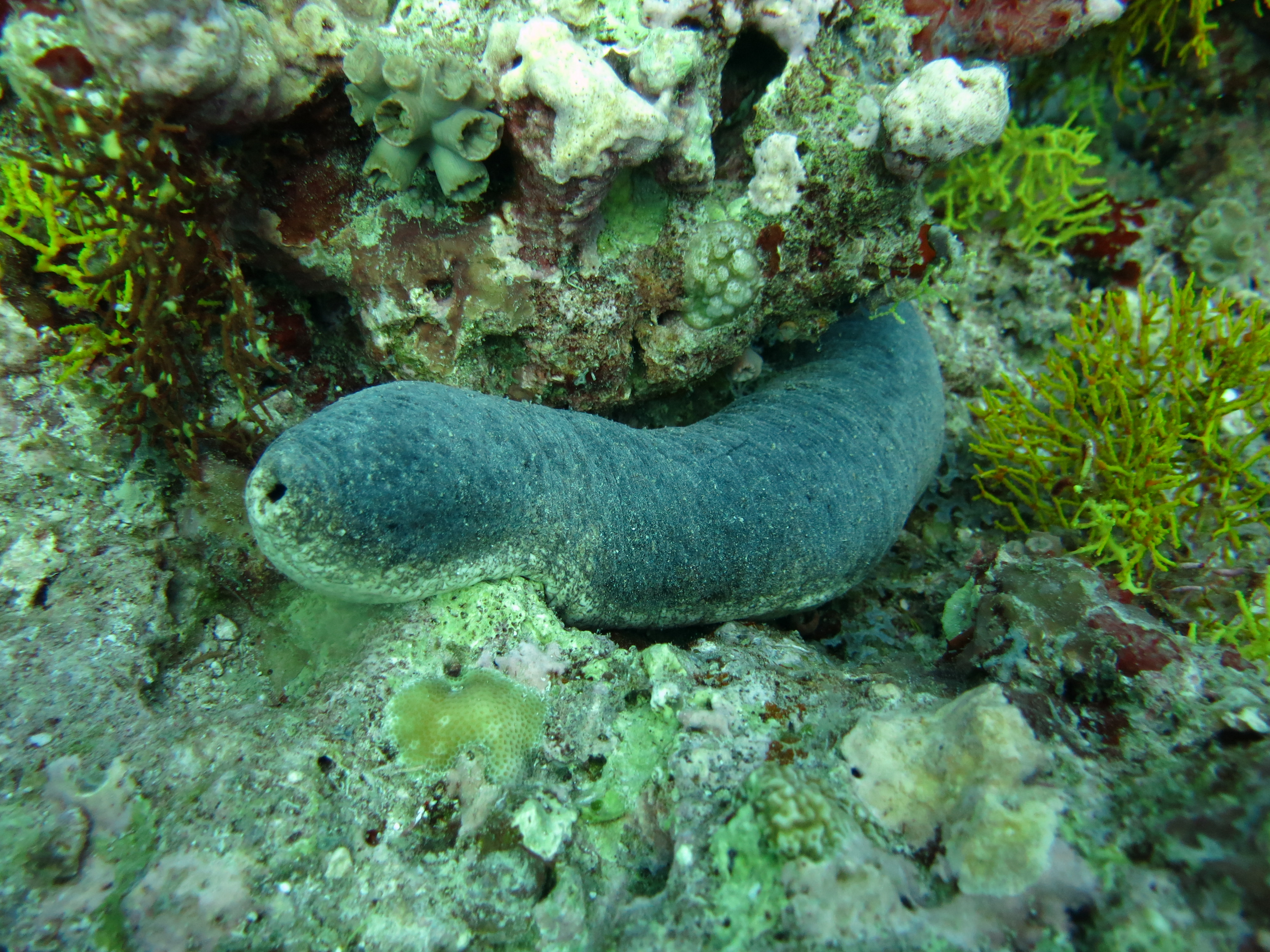
In Maldives

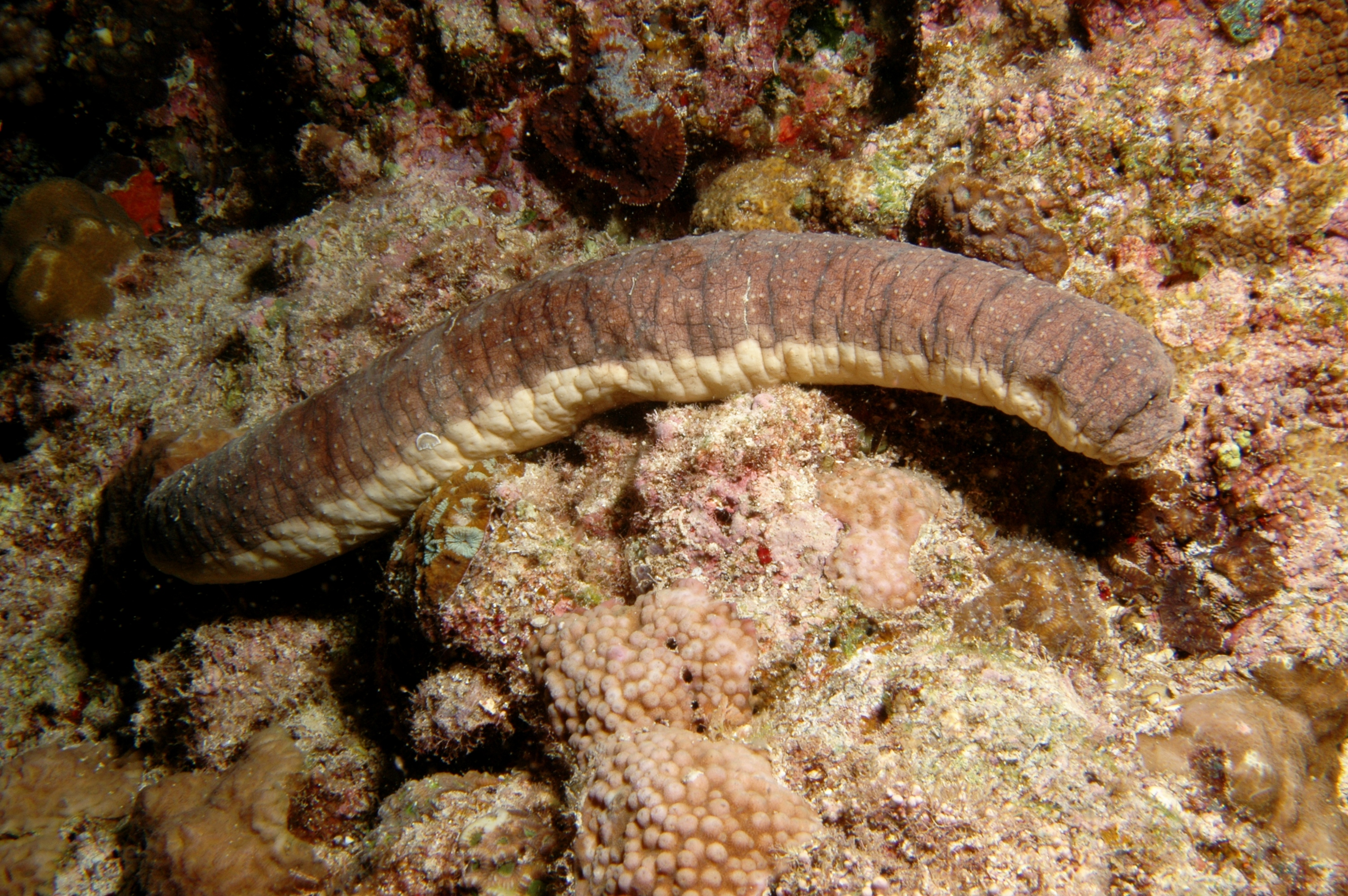
Grey form from Japan

== Distribution and habitat ==
Holothuria edulis is a common and widespread species in the Indo-Pacific Ocean. It lives on the seabed at depths down to 20 metres (66 ft). Its range extends from the Red Sea and East African coast to Sri Lanka, Japan, China, Indonesia, the Philippines, northern Australia and various Pacific islands. It is found in a number of different habitats including on sandy or muddy substrates, on coral rubble and in seagrass meadows. It can be found on inner and outer reef flats, on back reef slopes and in lagoons.

== Biology ==
Holothuria edulis is mainly nocturnal and tends to hide during the day under rocks or pieces of coral. It is a detritivore and feeds by ingesting sand and debris which has accumulated on the seabed which it picks up using its feeding tentacles. Sand is pushed into the mouth and any organic matter present, including the biofilm round the grains, is digested as the sand passes through the gut. The indigestible matter is expelled from the anus leaving a sand ridge as the animal moves around. During its feeding activities, the sea cucumber churns up the top few centimetres of seabed and aerates the sediment.

Locomotion in Holothuria edulis is very slow. It moves mainly by peristaltic action of its body wall, assisted to a limited extent by its tube feet. It can also anchor its feeding tentacles into the sand and haul itself along. If it gets overturned, it can use its feeding tentacles to help right itself.

Holothuria edulis has separate sexes and spawns at any time of year with gametes being liberated into the water column. The larvae are planktonic. This sea cucumber can also reproduce asexually by breaking into two parts, each of which then regrows the missing organs.

== Human use ==
=== As food ===
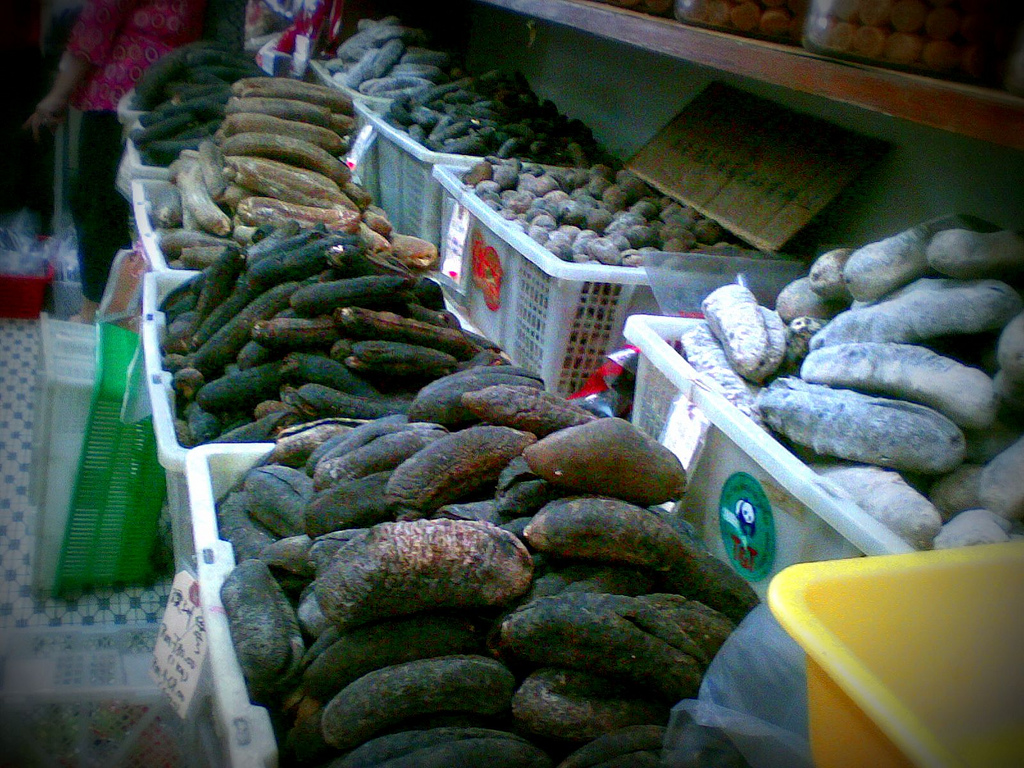
Dried "trepang" for sale

As its name implies, Holothuria edulis is edible. It is dried and sold as "bêche-de-mer" or "trepang" in China and Indonesia.

=== As aquarium animal ===
Holothuria edulis is common in the aquarium trade for its colors and its ability to eat detritus. It needs a tank size of 50 US gallons (190 litres) or more. It is easy to care for but may release a toxin when stressed, although this only happens very rarely.
