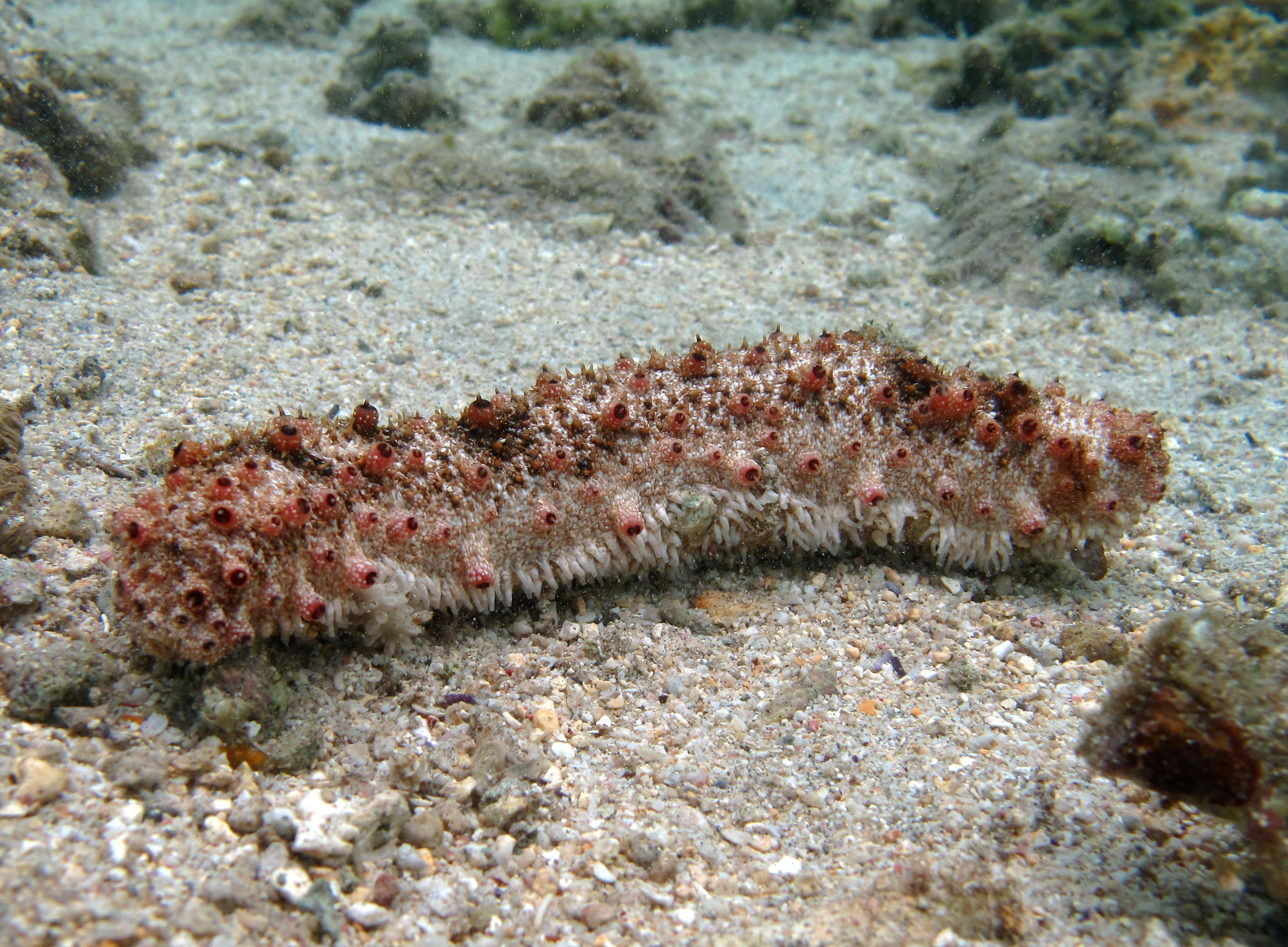

Conservation status
- Least Concern (IUCN 3.1)

Scientific classification
- Kingdom: Animalia
- Phylum: Echinodermata
- Class: Holothuroidea
- Order: Holothuriida
- Family: Holothuriidae
- Genus: Holothuria
- Species: H. pervicax

Binomial name
- Holothuria pervicax Selenka, 1867

= Holothuria pervicax =

Species of sea cucumber

Holothuria pervicax is a species of sea cucumber in the genus Holothuria. It is commonly called the stubborn sea cucumber due to its inability to be kept alive in captivity. It is commonly found buried beneath rocks on reefs in warm waters.

== Description ==
Holothuria perviax is a gray or brown sea cucumber with red-brown papillae and white tube feet for locomotion. Its body is elongated with an oral-aboral orientation and can grow up to 30 centimeters. It has a soft epidermis and a somewhat bumpy body. Its mouth is surrounded by thin branched tentacles with poorly formed spricules found around the body. Distinctions between H. perviax and sister species fusconierea are hard to find but the main differences are spicule size and slight coloration differences.

Aquariums have had a very hard time keeping these animals alive and have yet to successfully keep one in captivity, earning this species the name "stubborn sea cucumber". This has led to the belief that this animal is highly sensitive and requires a very specific lifestyle in order to survive.

== Distribution ==
Commonly found in the Maldives, Australia, Cebu (Philippines), Cook Islands, Comoros, French Polynesia, Guam, Hawaii, Indo Pacific, Indonesia, Johnston Atoll, Kenya, Marshall Islands, New Caledonia, Papua New Guinea, Reunion, Somalia, Sulu Sea, Tansania, The cocos Islands, The Seychelles, Western Indian Ocean, Western Pacific Ocean. Its preferred habitat is under rocks in reefs found in warmer waters ranging from 24°C to 28.7°C.

== Reproduction ==
Sexes are separate in these cucumbers with individuals having one gonad. Fertilization and spawning happen externally. Their planktonic larvae (auricularia) morph with age into barrel shaped larvae and then finally into juvenile sea cucumbers.

== Diet ==
Sea cucumbers are effective suspension and deposit feeders typically becoming active feeding at night. They have conveyor belt feeding methods where they ingest the substrate's surface and defecate on it.

== Ecology ==
Holothuria perviax has many defense mechanisms to fight against being preyed upon. It is able to expel its guts as well as large amounts of Cuvierian tubules when disturbed. These cucumbers can release a toxin called holothurian that has the ability to kill fish, small worms, and mollusks. It can be released through the anus or the front of the body causing rupture of the tentacles, pharynx, and part of the intestine that can be regenerated over time. Expulsion through the anus is used to entangle prey but the tubule is destroyed in the process and takes weeks to regenerate. The toxin may be expelled after the cucumber dies, if it gets damaged, or if an animal is picking at it. Change in temperature or salinity will cause release of the toxin and it only takes about 5 mins to kill a fish, which explains why this species is so hard to keep in captivity.

Research has found that this cucumber secretes a biologically active glycosphingolipid HPG-7 that is a major component of cell membranes. Glycosophingolipids function as antigens, mediators of cell adhesion, and aid signal transduction. Sea cucumbers have high commercial value due to their production of nutrients such as vitamins A, B_{1}, B_{2}, and B_{3}, and minerals such as calcium, magnesium, iron and zinc. Many of these nutrients can be used in pharmaceutical medicines such as anti-angiogenic, anticancer, anticoagulant, anti-hypertension, anti-inflammatory, antimicrobial, antioxidant, antithrombotic, antitumor and wound healing.
