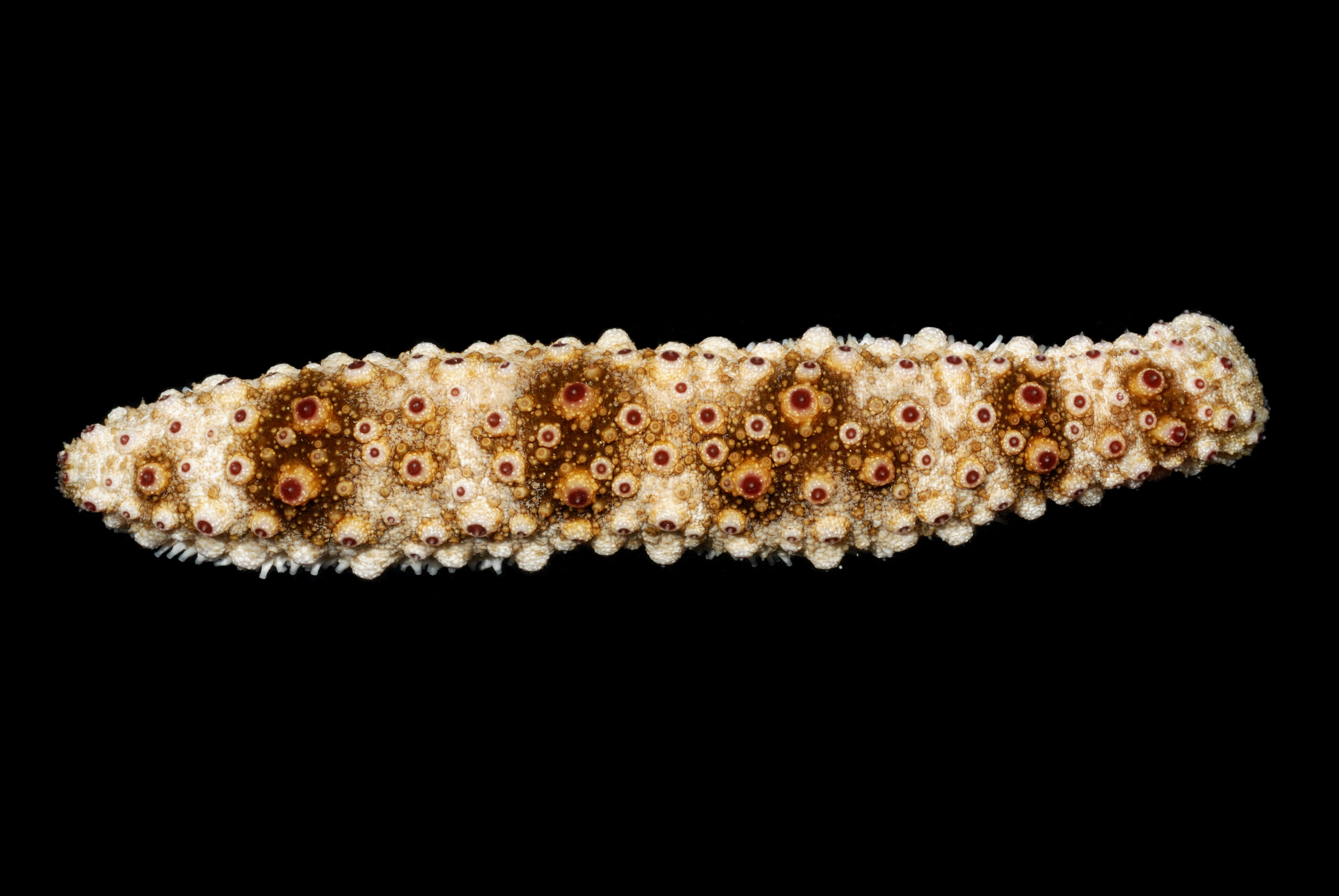
- Holothuria pervicax

Scientific classification
- Kingdom: Animalia
- Phylum: Echinodermata
- Class: Holothuroidea
- Order: Holothuriida
- Family: Holothuriidae; Burmeister, 1837

Genera
- 5, see text

Synonyms
- List: Actinopygidae Domantay, 1969; Bohadschiidae Gill, 1907; Bohadschiidae Poche, 1907; Holothuridae Burmeister, 1837; Holothuriidae Ludwig, 1894; Labidodematidae James, 1981; Labidodematidae Domantay, 1969; Lessonothuriidae Domantay, 1969; Ludwigothuriidae Domantay, 1969; Selenkothuriidae Domantay, 1969; Vaneyothuriidae Domantay, 1969

= Holothuriidae =

Family of sea cucumbers

Holothuriidae is a family of sea cucumbers, a type of echinoderm.

== Description ==
Members of the family Holothuriidae have thick fleshy bodies and several rows of tube feet which are used for moving around and for adhering to the surface. The body is often covered with blunt projections known as papillae. Many of the members of this family are able to eject a mass of fine sticky threads known as cuvierian tubules to distract predators, or even turn their viscera inside out.

For the taxonomic determination, the genera Actinopyga and Bohadschia have their spicules exclusively shaped like sticks, and the genera Holothuria and Labidodemas never have theirs shaped like tables. Actinopyga is also equipped with anal teeth (modified podia), and never throw out Cuvieran tubules, just like Pearsonothuria.

Members of this family occur throughout the oceans of the world at low to middle latitudes. They often live in coral reefs and nearby sandy habitat types, and a few occur in deeper waters. In the Indo-Pacific they are often dominant taxa in coral reef habitat. Most species are detritivores.

== Genera ==
This is the second largest family of sea cucumbers with over 200 recognized species.

Accepted genera are:

- Actinopyga Bronn, 1860 – 18 species
- Bohadschia Jaeger, 1833 – 12 species
- Holothuria Linnaeus, 1767 – 163 species
- Labidodemas Selenka, 1867 – 8 species
- Pearsonothuria Levin in Levin, Kalinin & Stonik, 1984 – 1 species
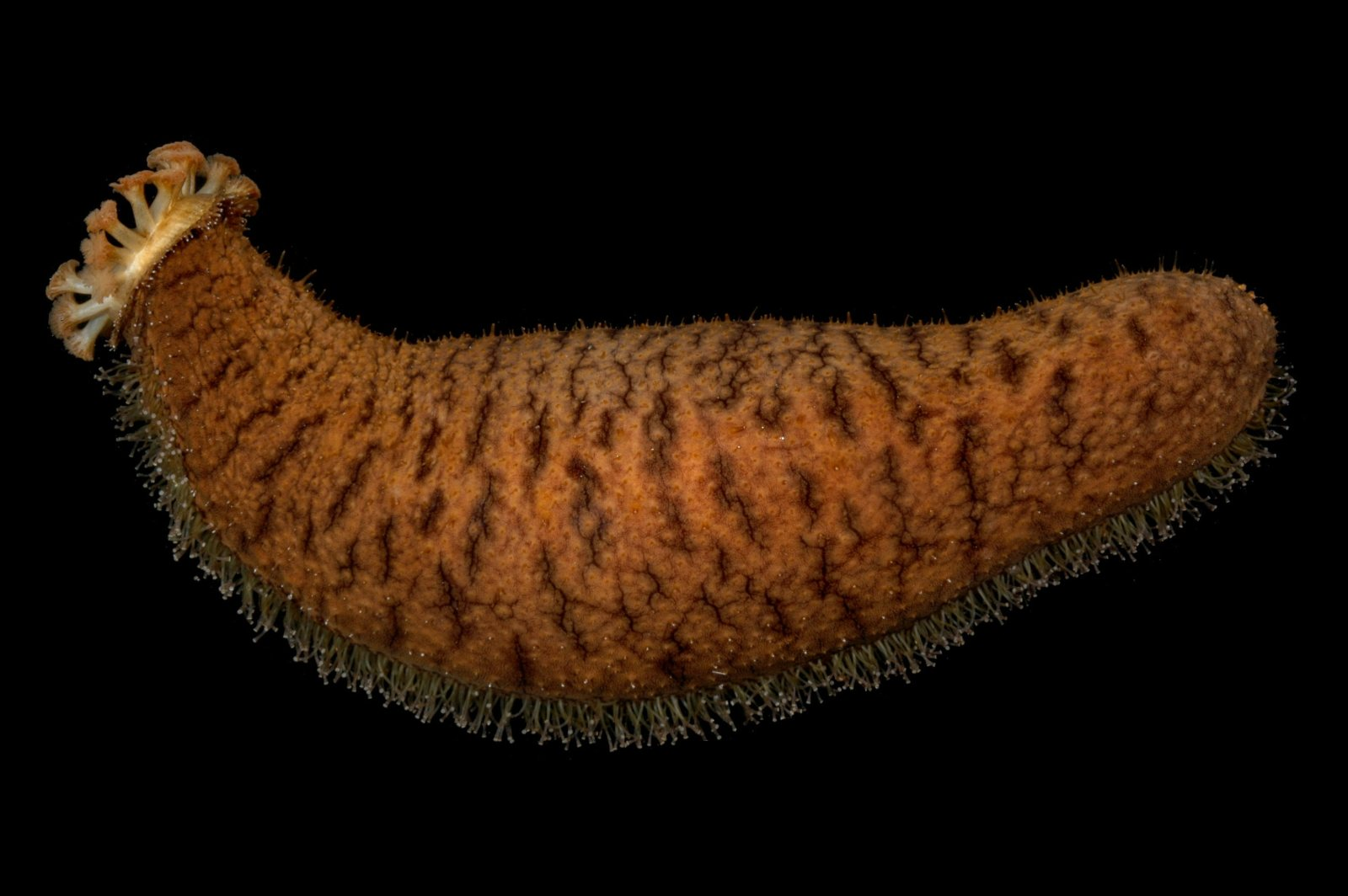
Actinopyga echinites

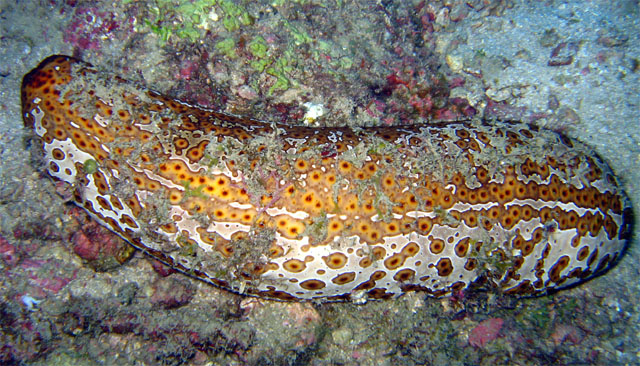
Bohadschia argus

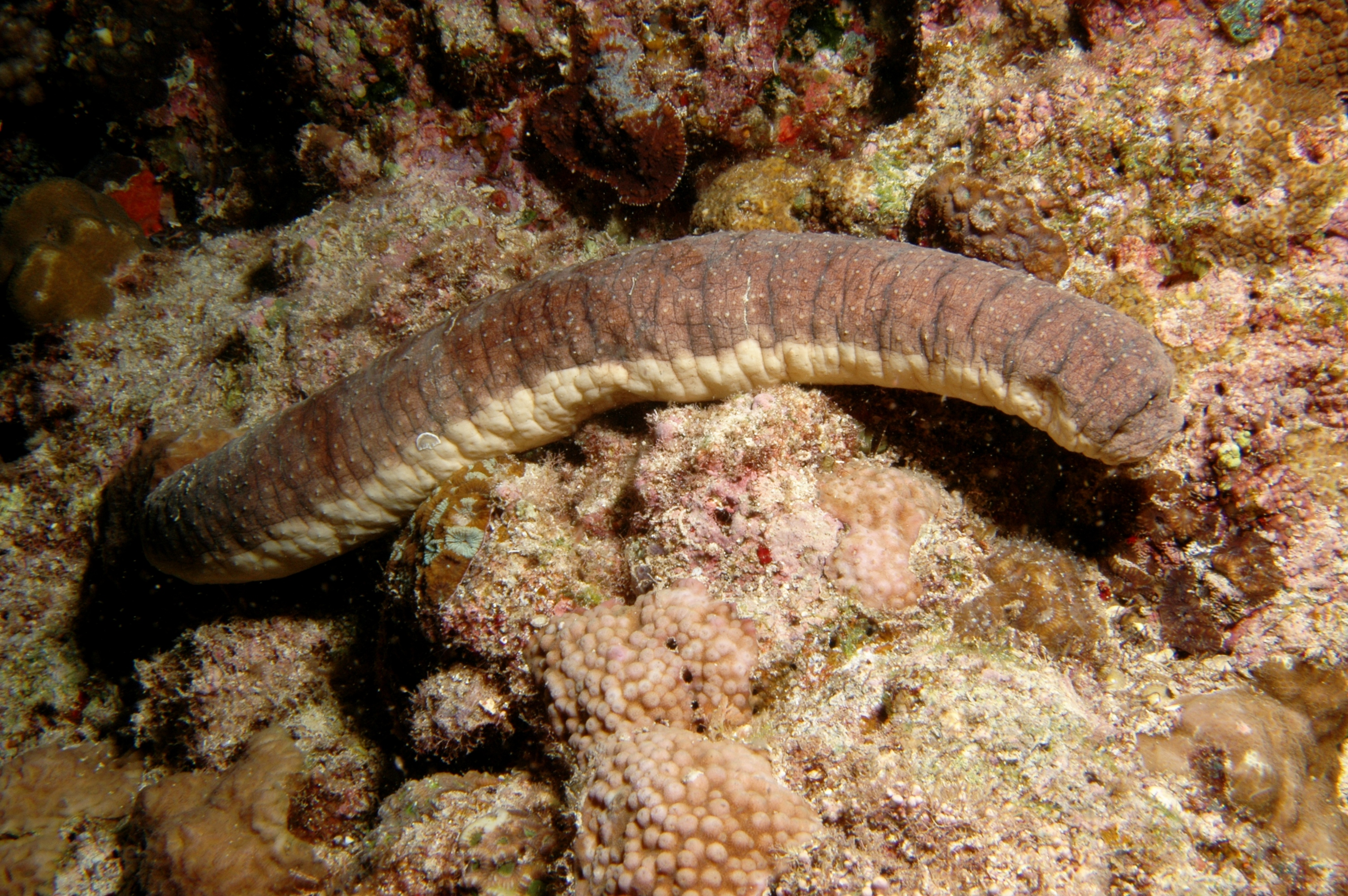
Holothuria edulis

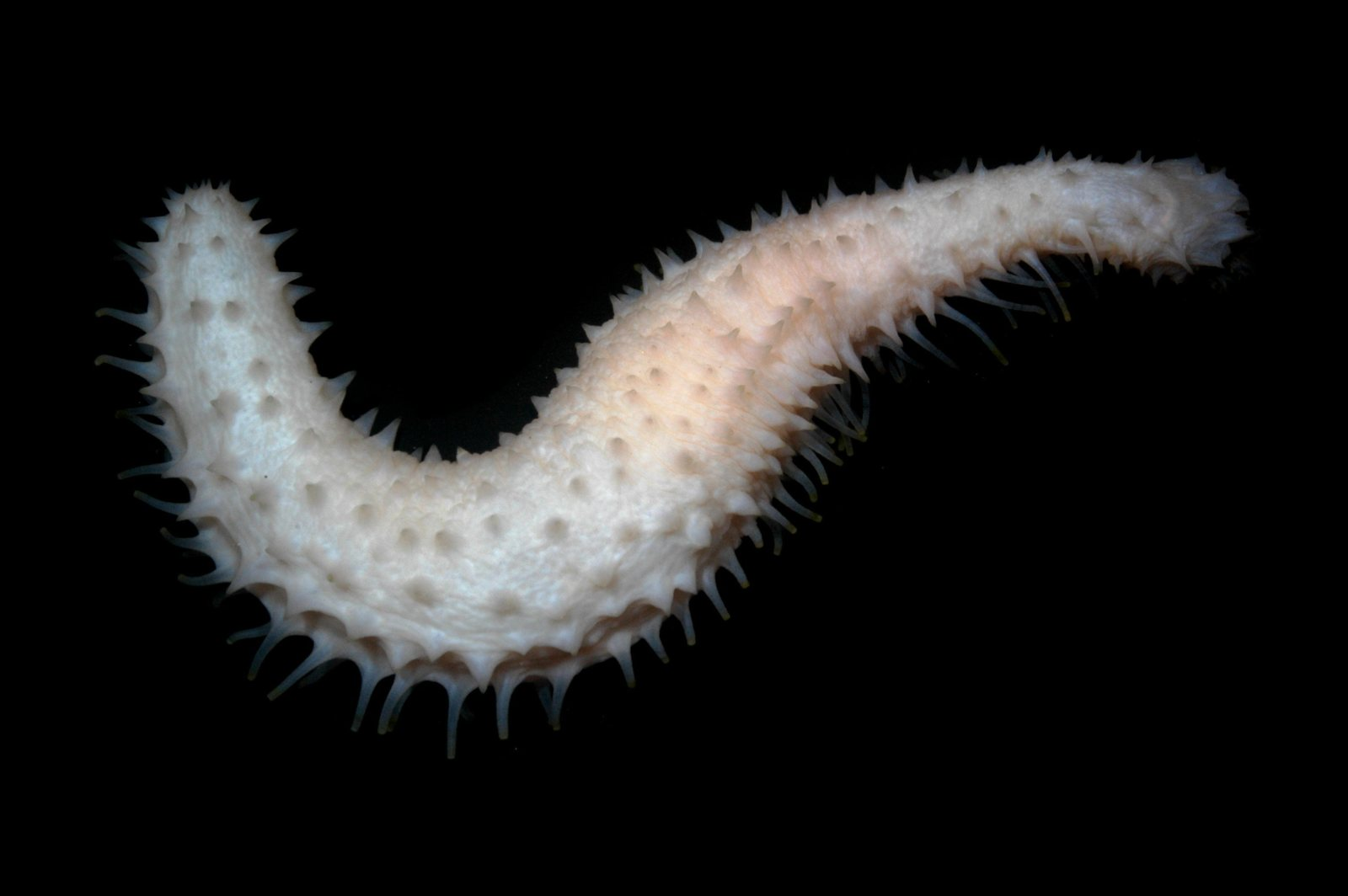
Labidodemas rugosum

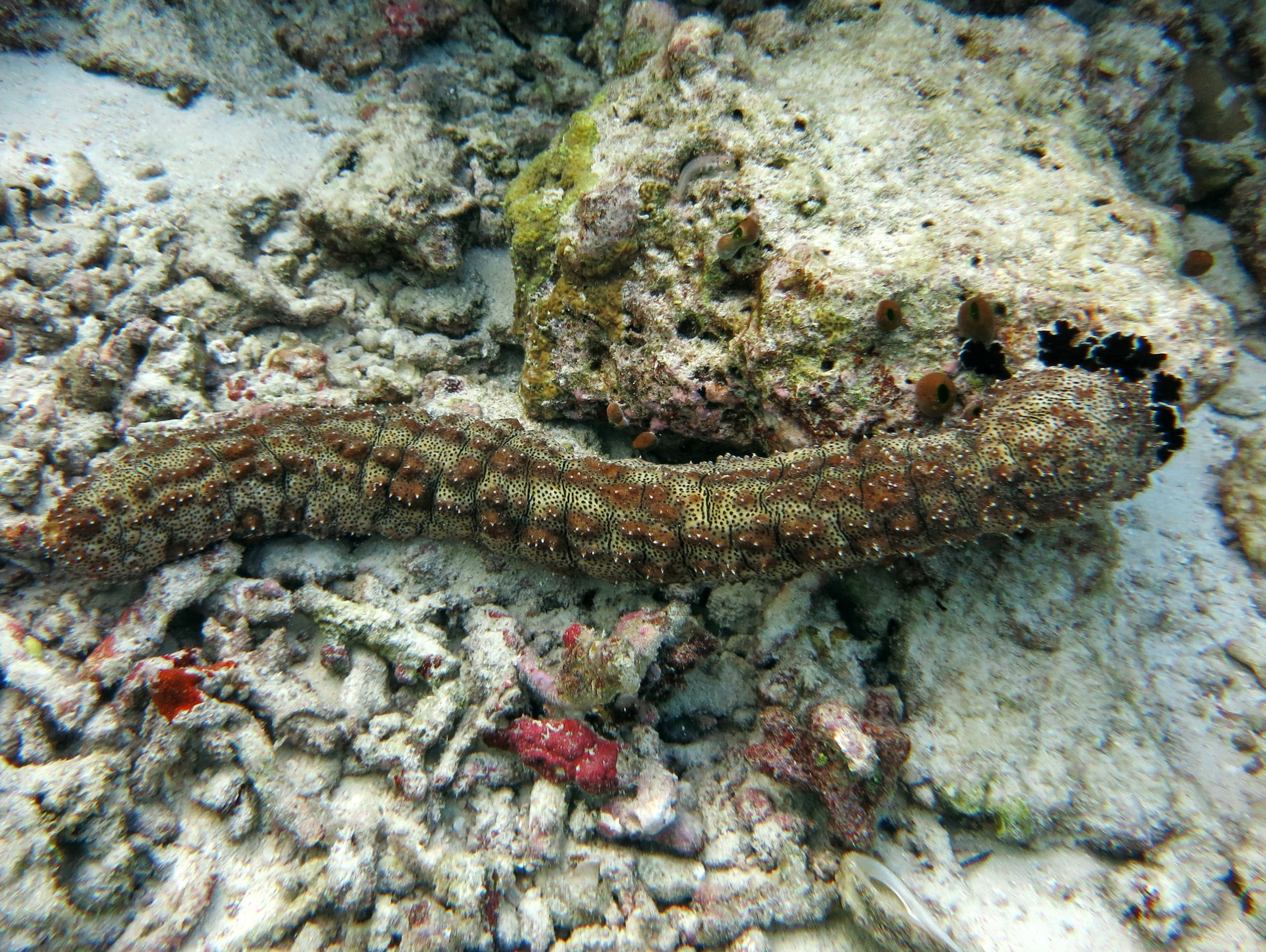
Pearsonothuria graeffei
