= List of echinoderms of Sri Lanka =

Sri Lanka is a tropical island situated close to the southern tip of India. The invertebrate fauna is as large as it is common to other regions of the world. So it is complicated to summarize the exact number of species found within the country.

Echinoderms belong to the phylum Echinodermata. They are deuterostomes that are closely related to chordates. Echinoderms are characterized by having a water vascular system, tube feet, radial symmetry, and undergo complete regeneration from a single limb. It is the largest phylum that has no freshwater or terrestrial members. There are five classes of echinoderms: Asteroidea (starfish), Ophiuroidea (brittle star), Echinoidea (sea urchin), Crinoidea (sea lily) and Holothuroidea (sea cucumber).

The following list provides echinoderms currently identified in Sri Lankan waters.

== Sea Urchins ==
The first detailed work on irregular echinoids was carried out by Agassiz in 1872 and then by Clark & Rowe in 1971 where they compiled records of 24 species of irregular sea urchins in the "Ceylon area". However, some of these localities now belong to the Indian Territory. In 2017, a recent species list has been made by Arachchige et al., where he described 27 irregular echinoids from Sri Lankan waters. The information on regular echinoids was listed by Agassiz & Desor in 1846 which continued to advance until the end of the 19th century. Then, there was a knowledge gap between the mid-20th and the beginning of the 21st centuries mainly due to a lack of systematic studies. However, in the latter part, two checklists have been published by the IUCN Red List in 2006 and 2012.

Currently, in Sri Lanka, there are 39 regular echinoids belong to 28 genera, nine families, and five orders are recorded. Meanwhile, there are 21 irregular echinoid species belong to four orders, nine families, and 15 genera in Sri Lanka.

== Irregular echinoids ==
=== Order: Echinoneoida ===
==== Family: Echinoneidae ====
- Echinoneus cyclostomus
- Koehleraster abnormalis

=== Order: Echinolampadoida ===
==== Family: Echinolampadidae - Cassiduloids ====
- Echinolampas alexandri
- Echinolampas ovata

=== Order: Clypeasteroida - Sand dollars ===
==== Family: Astriclypeidae ====
- Echinodiscus bisperforatus
- Echinodiscus truncatus
- Sculpsitechinus auritus

==== Family: Clypeasteridae ====
- Clypeaster humilis
- Clypeaster reticulatus

==== Family: Fibulariidae ====
- Echinocyamus megapetalus
- Fibulariella angulipora
- Fibularia

==== Family: Laganidae ====
- Jacksonaster depressum
- Peronella lesueuri
- Peronella oblonga

=== Order: Spatangoida - Heart urchins ===
==== Family: Brissidae ====
- Brissus agassizii
- Metalia sternalis

==== Family: Loveniidae ====
- Lovenia elongate

==== Family: Maretiidae ====
- Nacospatangus alta

== Regular echinoids ==
=== Order: Cidaroida ===
==== Family: Cidaridae ====
- Phyllacanthus imperialis

=== Order: Diadematoida ===
==== Family: Diadematidae ====
- Astropyga radiata
- Diadema savignyi
- Diadema setosum
- Echinothrix calamaris
- Echinothrix diadema

=== Order: Stomopneustoida ===
==== Family: Stomopneustidae ====
- Stomopneustes variolaris

=== Order: Camarodonta ===
==== Family: Echinometridae ====
- Echinometra ex
- Echinostrephus molaris
- Heterocentrotus mamillatus

==== Family: Temnopleuridae ====
- Microcyphus ceylanicus
- Salmacis bicolor
- Salmacis virgulata
- Temnopleurus toreumaticus

==== Family: Toxopneustidae ====
- Pseudoboletia maculata
- Toxopneustes pileolus
- Tripneustes gratilla

== Starfish ==
The exact number of starfish in Sri Lankan waters is unknown. Many works came through the work done based on Indian echinoderms in and around Indian seas.

=== Order: Valvatida ===
==== Family: Acanthasteridae ====
- Acanthaster planci

==== Family: Asterinidae ====
- Asterina coronata

==== Family: Ophidiasteridae ====
- Gomophia egyptiaca
- Heteronardoa carinata
- Linckia multifora

==== Family: Oreasteridae ====
- Anthenea pentagonula
- Anthenea regalis
- Goniodiscaster scaber
- Siraster tuberculatus
- Stellaster equestris
- Stellaster incei

==== Family: Goniasteridae ====
- Fromia indica

=== Order: Forcipulatida ===
==== Family: Asteriidae ====
- Astrostole scabra

=== Order: Paxillosida ===
==== Family: Astropectinidae ====
- Astropecten vappa

==== Family: Luidiidae ====
- Luidia sagamina
- Luidia savignyi

== Brittle stars ==
There is little works have done to identify the brittle star species around Sri Lanka. But, further detailed work is necessary to compile a checklist.

=== Order: Ophiurida ===
==== Family: Ophiactidae ====
- Ophiactis savignyi

==== Family: Ophiocomidae ====
- Ophiocoma anaglyptica

==== Family: Ophiodermatidae ====
- Ophiarachnella gorgonia
- Ophiodyscrita instrata

==== Family: Ophiolepididae ====
- Ophiolepis cincta

==== Family: Ophiomyxidae ====
- Ophiarachna incrassata

==== Family: Ophiotrichidae ====
- Gymnolophus obscura

== Sea cucumber ==
The diversity of sea cucumbers of Sri Lanka show extensive research work. Many species are edible and economically important, whereas some researches about sea cucumbers in the coastal waters of Sri Lanka have been documented. However, some species are extensively studied. The sea cucumber fishery was introduced to Sri Lanka by the Chinese particularly through the commodities taken to China for centuries. Since 1980, sea cucumber fishery rapidly grown throughout north, east and northwestern Sri Lankan coast. In 2010, D.C.T. Dissanayake and Gunnar Stefansson compiled a research on the abundance and distribution of commercial sea cucumber species in the coastal waters of Sri Lanka. They described twenty-five sea cucumber species belonging to seven genera from east and northwest coasts of Sri Lanka. Another research was carried out from May 2014 to June 2015 in Viyaparimuli and Munnai to identify the species composition and diversity of sea cucumber population in the Point Pedro coastal area of Jaffna peninsula. In 2008, Dissanayaka and Athukorala recorded 24 sea cucumber species from Northwestern and Eastern parts of Sri Lanka, and then in 2014, Kuganathan has reported sixteen species of sea cucumbers in the Jaffna estuary. In 2017, the status of holothurian fisheries in Mullaitivu coastal waters in the North-East region of Sri Lanka was documented. In 2020, a new sea cucumber record was identified from nearby waters. Apart from that, leading scientist D.C.T. Dissanayake has done extensive work on sea cucumbers.

=== Order: Apodida ===
==== Family: Synaptidae ====
- Synaptula lamperti

=== Order: Holothuriida ===
==== Family: Holothuriidae ====
- Actinopyga echinites
- Actinopyga mauritiana
- Actinopyga miliaris
- Bohadschia argus
- Bohadschia atra
- Bohadschia maculisparsa
- Bohadschia marmorata
- Bohadschia vitiensis
- Holothuria atra
- Holothuria edulis
- Holothuria fuscocinerea
- Holothuria fuscogilva
- Holothuria hilla
- Holothuria isuga
- Holothuria leucospilota
- Holothuria nobilis
- Holothuria scabra
- Holoturia spinifera
- Holothuria sp., type "pentard"
- Pearsonothuria graeffei

=== Order: Molpadiida ===
==== Family: Caudinidae ====
- Acaudina molpadioides

=== Order: Synallactida ===
==== Family: Stichopodidae ====
- Stichopus variegatus
- Stichopus chloronotus
- Stichopus herrmanni
- Stichopus horrens
- Thelenota ananas
- Thelenota anax

== Sea lilies ==
Researches on sea lily or feather star diversity of Sri Lankan waters have been very limited when compared with other echinoderm classes.

=== Order: Comatulida ===
==== Family: Colobometridae ====
- Cenometra bella
- Colobometra arabica
- Decametra informis

==== Family: Comatulidae ====
- Comaster nobilis
- Comaster schlegelii

==== Family: Himerometridae ====
- Amphimetra molleri
- Himerometra robustipinna

==== Family: Mariametridae ====
- Lamprometra palmata
- Oxymetra finschii
- Stephanometra indica
- Stephanometra tenuipinna

==== Family: Tropiometridae ====
- Comatula pectinata
- Tropiometra carinata

==== Family: Zygometridae ====
- Zygometra andromeda
