= Stichopus rubermaculosus =

Conservation status
- Data Deficient (IUCN 3.1)

Scientific classification
- Kingdom: Animalia
- Phylum: Echinodermata
- Class: Holothuroidea
- Order: Synallactida
- Family: Stichopodidae
- Genus: Stichopus
- Species: S. rubermaculosus

Binomial name
- Stichopus rubermaculosus Massin, Zulfigar, Hwai & Boss, 2002

Species of sea cucumber

Stichopus rubermaculosus is a species of sea cucumber in the family Stichopodidae. It is found on the seabed in the tropical, western Indo-Pacific region.
