= Stichopus naso =

Scientific classification
- Kingdom: Animalia
- Phylum: Echinodermata
- Class: Holothuroidea
- Order: Synallactida
- Family: Stichopodidae
- Genus: Stichopus
- Species: S. naso

Binomial name
- Stichopus naso Semper, 1868

Species of sea cucumber

Stichopus naso is a species of sea cucumber from the family Stichopodidae

== Description ==
It is a classical Stichopus, stout and trapezoidal to rectangular in cross-section and with three rows of podia on the ventral face. Its color is uniform or mottled, from sandy to darj brown, with black lines and dots. Its dorsum wears huge and erected (though retractile) tubercle-like excrescences.

Stichopus naso, or also known as tropical holothurian but generally, in modern terms, it is considered a sea cucumber. Stichopus naso was discovered in 1867 specifically in the Philippines. The most recent discovery of this species was in 2011 by the coast of Kagoshima, Kyushu, Japan

== Range ==
This species can be found from the Andaman Sea to New Caledonia and southern Japan, including Philippines and Indonesia.

== Habitat ==
It is a tropical species, living between 1 and 20m, often in seagrass beds.

== Ecology ==
It is a diurnal and nocturnal species (unlike most of its sibling species), often associated to seagrass beds.

== Bibliography ==
- Purcell, S.W., Samyn, Y. & Conand, C. Commercially important sea cucumbers of the world, FAO Species Catalogue for Fishery Purposes. No. 6. Rome, FAO. 2012. 150 pp. 30 colour plates.
