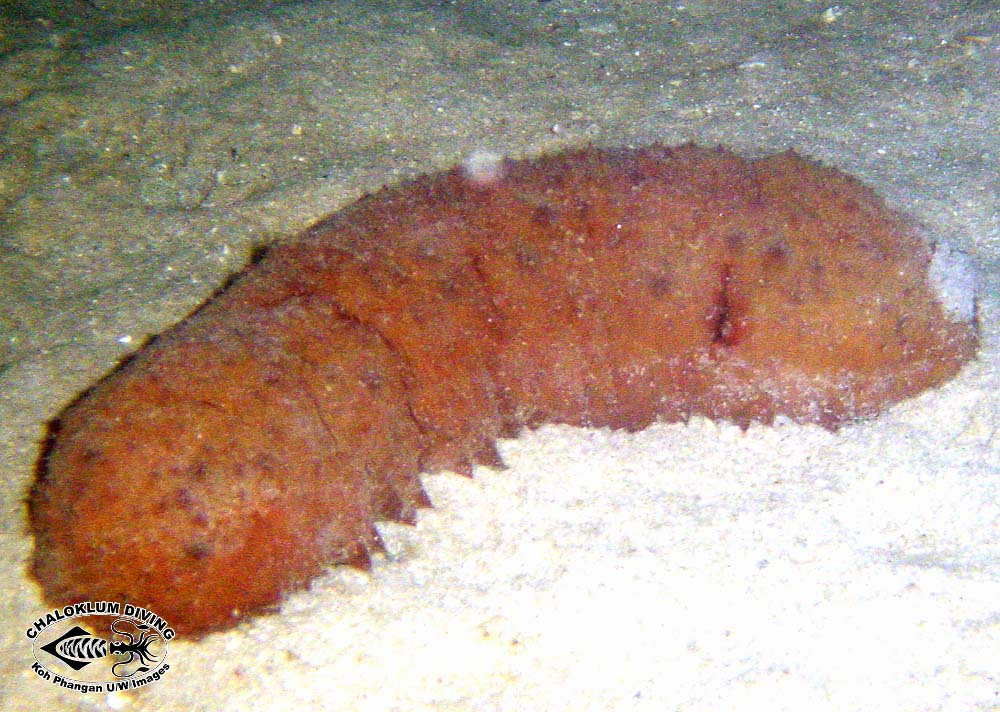

Conservation status
- Least Concern (IUCN 3.1)

Scientific classification
- Kingdom: Animalia
- Phylum: Echinodermata
- Class: Holothuroidea
- Order: Synallactida
- Family: Stichopodidae
- Genus: Stichopus
- Species: S. noctivagus

Binomial name
- Stichopus noctivagus Cherbonnier, 1980

= Stichopus noctivagus =

Species of sea cucumber

Stichopus noctivagus, commonly known as the night-wandering sea cucumber, is a species of sea cucumber in the family Stichopodidae.

It is found on sandy seabeds in the tropical Western Indo-Pacific region, with its range including Guam, Indonesia, New Caledonia, Palau, the Philippines, and possibly Hawaii.
