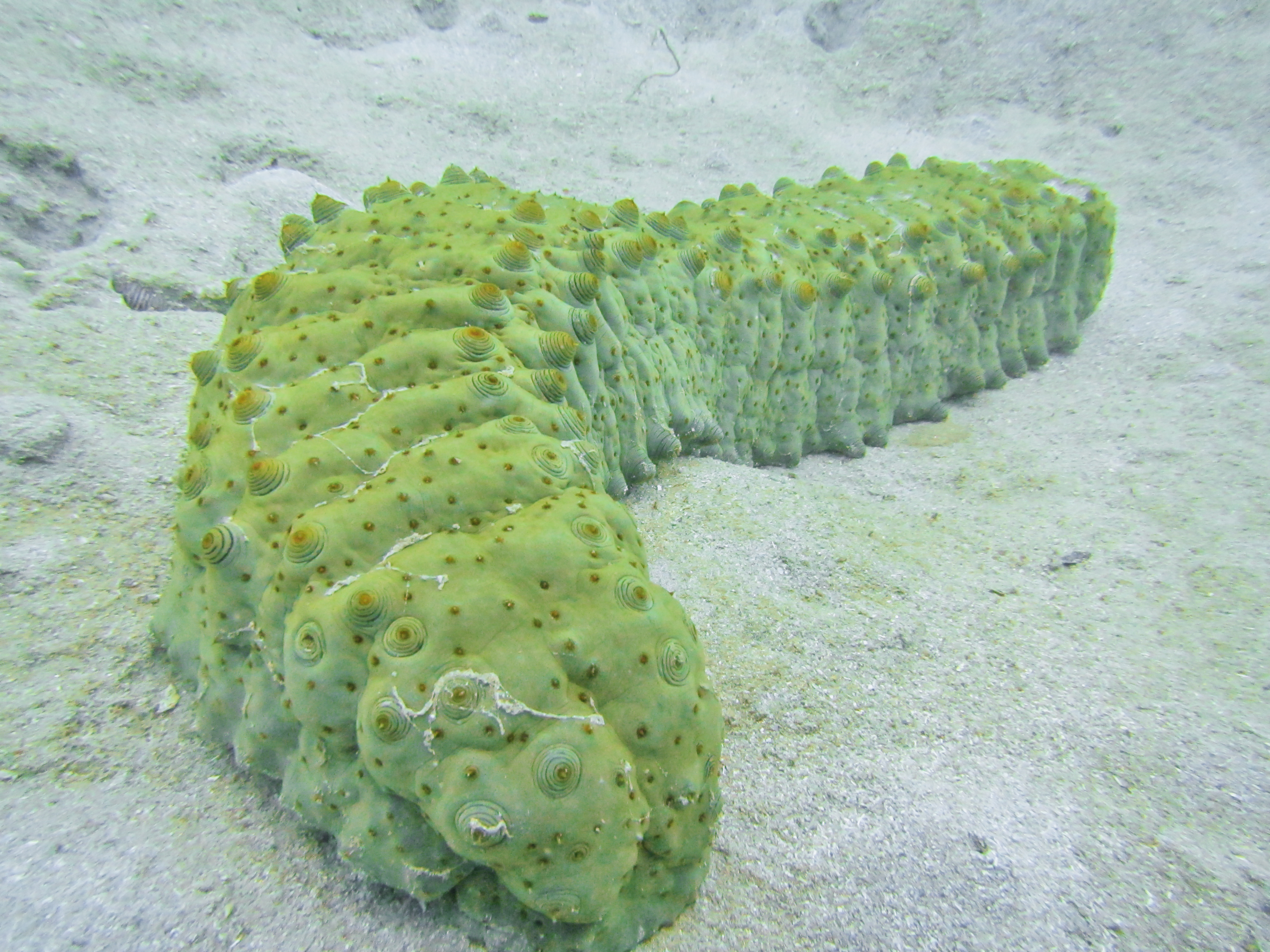

Conservation status
- Vulnerable (IUCN 3.1)

Scientific classification
- Kingdom: Animalia
- Phylum: Echinodermata
- Class: Holothuroidea
- Order: Synallactida
- Family: Stichopodidae
- Genus: Stichopus
- Species: S. herrmanni

Binomial name
- Stichopus herrmanni Semper, 1868

Synonyms
- Stichopus variegatus Semper, 1868

= Stichopus herrmanni =

Species of sea cucumber

Stichopus herrmanni, or Herrmann's sea cucumber, is a species of holothuroidean echinoderm in the family Stichopodidae. It is found in the tropical, western Indo-Pacific Ocean, at depths down to 20 m (66 ft). This and several other species are known as curryfish and are harvested commercially; it is called gama in Indonesia.

== Description ==
Stichopus herrmanni is a large species of sea cucumber, growing up to 50 cm (20 in) long. The body is cylindrical with a flat sole. The body wall is rough and wrinkled, without large swellings but with orange-brown papillae (conical fleshy protuberances). The mouth is surrounded by eight to sixteen feeding tentacles and the sole bears short tube feet. The colour is variable, in some locations being greyish-brown, greenish-brown, or sandy-brown, while in others being mustard-yellow, orange-brown or green and brown.

== Distribution and habitat ==
Stichopus herrmanni is found in the tropical west Indo-Pacific region. Its range extends from the east coast of Africa to Malaysia, Indonesia and Australia. It occurs on sand and mud substrates, seagrass meadows and rubble at depths down to about 25 m (80 ft).

== Uses ==
There is a commercial fishery for this species in Indonesia and northern Australia. It is known as "curryfish", but this name encompasses several species, S. herrmanni, Stichopus vastus and Stichopus ocellatus and landings of the three species are recorded as one. At one time, this species was not harvested because the flesh easily disintegrated, but modern processing methods provide better handling and it has now become a high value product. In Queensland, a minimum length of 35 cm (14 in) is in force.

== Conservation status ==
Although the population of S. herrmanni is stable in Australia, elsewhere fishing pressure is causing declines in its populations over most of its range. As a result of overfishing of more desirable species, this species is likely to face greater exploitation, and the International Union for Conservation of Nature has assessed its conservation status as "vulnerable". This species occurs in several protected areas over its range, including the Dr. K.K. Mohammed Koya Sea Cucumber Conservation Reserve in Lakshwadeep, India.

== See also ==
- Sea cucumber as food
