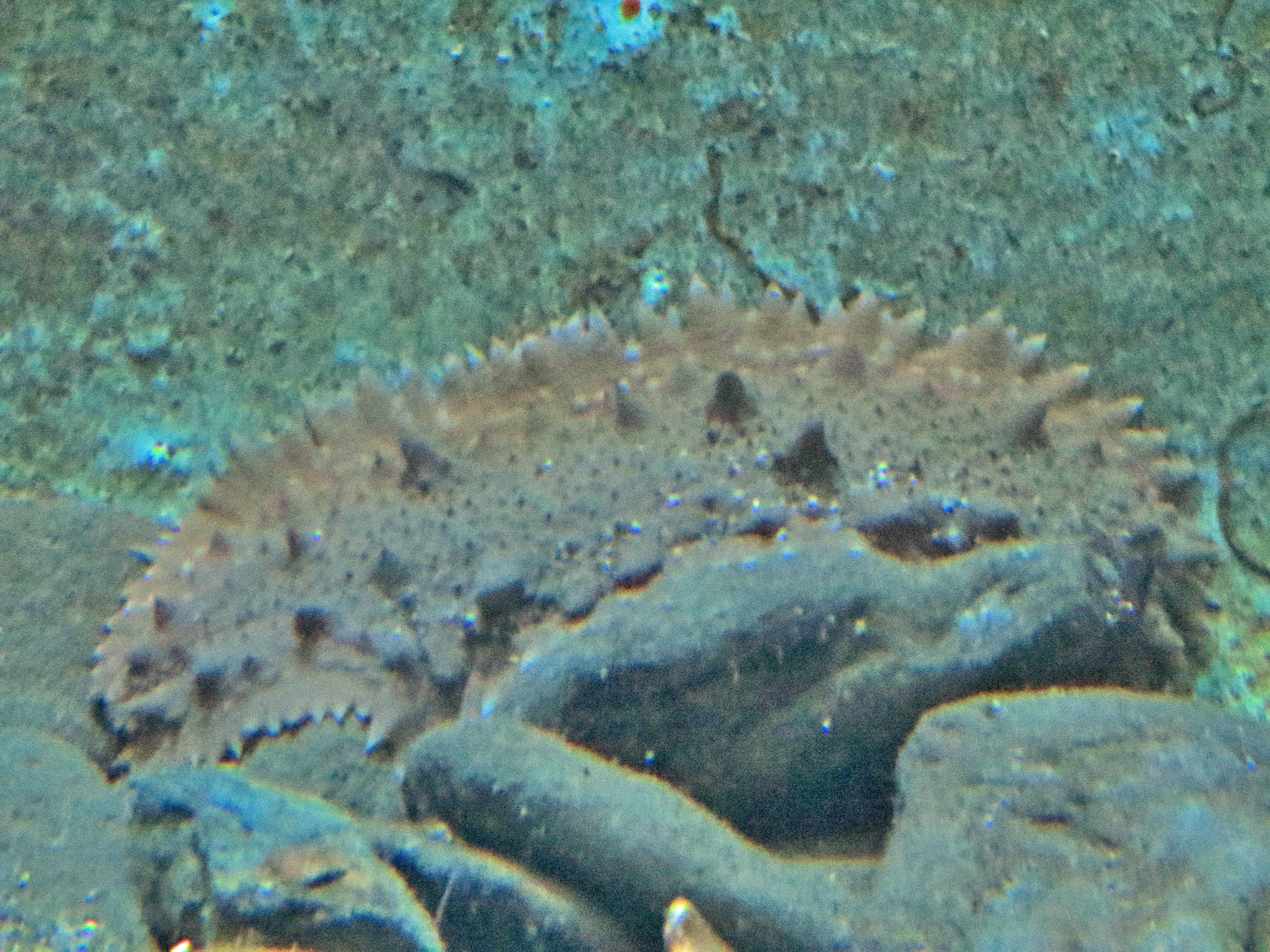

Conservation status
- Least Concern (IUCN 3.1)

Scientific classification
- Kingdom: Animalia
- Phylum: Echinodermata
- Class: Holothuroidea
- Order: Synallactida
- Family: Stichopodidae
- Genus: Parastichopus
- Species: P. regalis

Binomial name
- Parastichopus regalis (Cuvier, 1817)

Synonyms
- Eostichopus regalis (Cuvier, 1817); Gastrothuria limbata Perrier, R., 1899; Holothuria limbata Perrier, R., 1898; Holothuria regalis Cuvier, 1817; Holothuria triquetra Delle Chiaje, 1828; Pudendum regale Cuvier, 1817; Stichopus regalis (Cuvier, 1817)

= Parastichopus regalis =

Species of sea cucumber

Parastichopus regalis, also known as the royal sea cucumber, is a species of sea cucumber in the family Stichopodidae.

== Description ==
Parastichopus regalis grows to a length of about 20 cm (8 in). The body is soft and somewhat flattened, and a clearly incised lateral fold with large papillae separates the dorsal surface from the ventral surface. The dorsal surface is mottled brown, and the ventral surface is rather paler, with a darker longitudinal streak in the centre. The bony sclerites that strengthen the integument include tables, terminal plates and perforated plates; the sclerites in the tentacles that surround the mouth include elongated, branched, perforated and arched rods.

== Distribution and habitat ==
Parastichopus regalis is found in the Mediterranean Sea, along the coasts of Africa in the eastern Atlantic Ocean, and in the tropical and subtropical western Atlantic Ocean, including the Gulf of Mexico. It is typically found on sand or other soft substrates, at depths down to about 800 m (2,600 ft); it is commonest in the 100 to 300 m (300 to 1,000 ft) depth range.

== Ecology ==
In a commensal arrangement, Parastichopus regalis is often host to the pearlfish Carapus acus, which enters the sea cucumber's respiratory tree via its anus. The fish lives inside the sea cucumber during the day, emerging into the open water at night to feed. Two fish may occupy a single host, and a pair have been known to breed inside their host. When stressed, it autotomises its internal organs, regenerating them again later.

== Status ==
This sea cucumber is a common species. It is edible and is eaten in parts of its range but is not a targeted species, being caught as bycatch during deepwater trawling.
