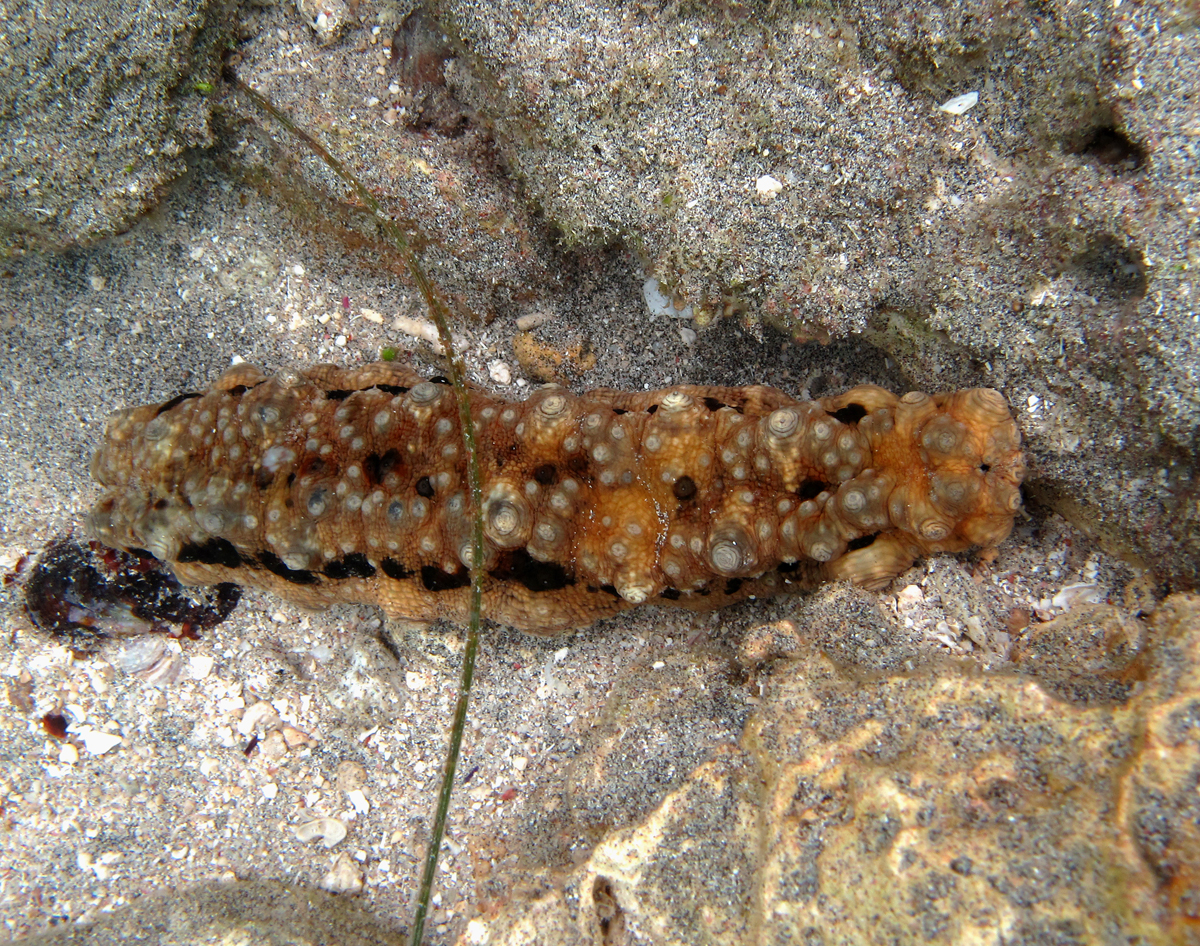

Conservation status
- Data Deficient (IUCN 3.1)

Scientific classification
- Kingdom: Animalia
- Phylum: Echinodermata
- Class: Holothuroidea
- Order: Synallactida
- Family: Stichopodidae
- Genus: Stichopus
- Species: S. monotuberculatus

Binomial name
- Stichopus monotuberculatus (Quoy & Gaimard, 1834)

Synonyms
- Holothuria monotuberculatus (Quoy & Gaimard, 1834)

= Stichopus monotuberculatus =

Species of sea cucumber

Stichopus monotuberculatus is a species of sea cucumber in the family Stichopodidae. It is found in the tropical, western Indo-Pacific Ocean.
