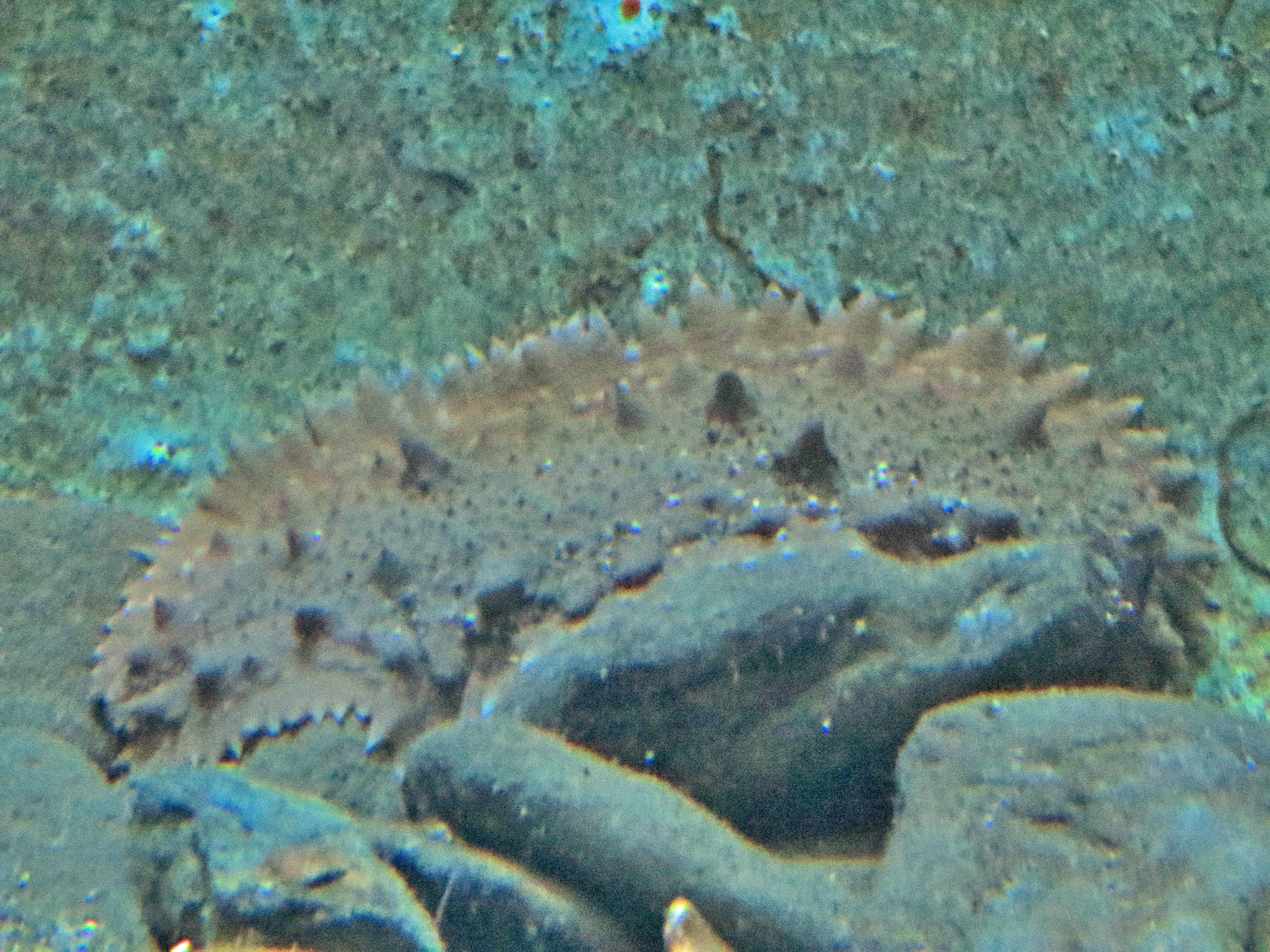
- Parastichopus regalis

Scientific classification
- Kingdom: Animalia
- Phylum: Echinodermata
- Class: Holothuroidea
- Order: Synallactida
- Family: Stichopodidae
- Genus: Parastichopus; Clark, 1922

Synonyms
- Gastrothuria Perrier, 1899; Pudendum Cuvier, 1817

= Parastichopus =

Genus of sea cucumbers

Parastichopus is a genus of sea cucumbers in the family Stichopodidae. They occur below the intertidal zone, at depths between 18 and 600 m (60 and 1,970 ft).

== Species ==
There are two accepted species:

- Parastichopus regalis (Cuvier, 1817) – royal sea cucumber
- Parastichopus tremulus (Gunnerus, 1767) – red sea cucumber

Parastichopus tremulus has gained interest both as wild-harvested and cultured species.
