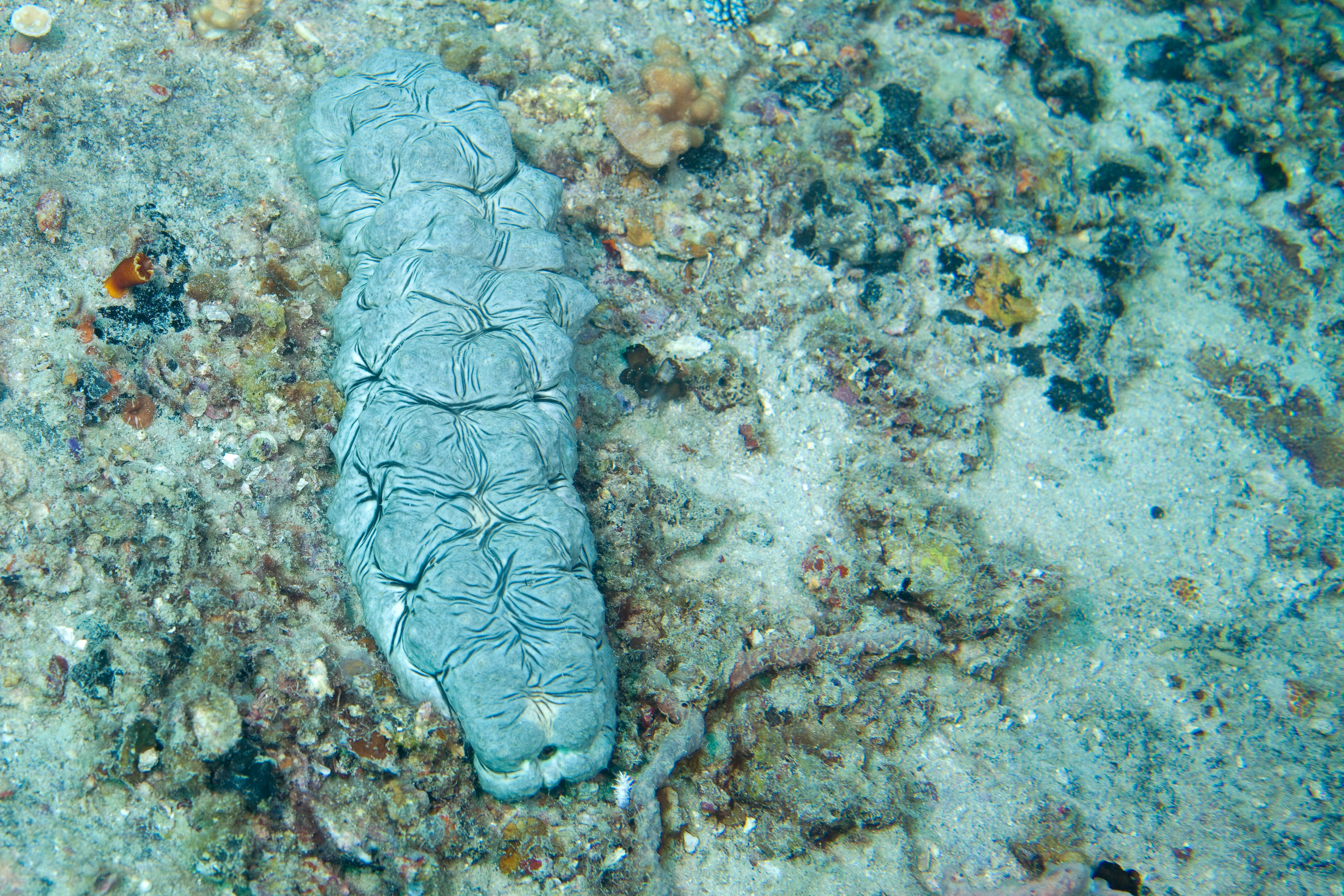

Conservation status
- Least Concern (IUCN 3.1)

Scientific classification
- Kingdom: Animalia
- Phylum: Echinodermata
- Class: Holothuroidea
- Order: Synallactida
- Family: Stichopodidae
- Genus: Stichopus
- Species: S. vastus

Binomial name
- Stichopus vastus Sluiter, 1887

= Stichopus vastus =

Species of sea cucumber

Stichopus vastus is a species of sea cucumber in the family Stichopodidae. It is found on the seabed in the tropical, western Indo-Pacific Ocean.
