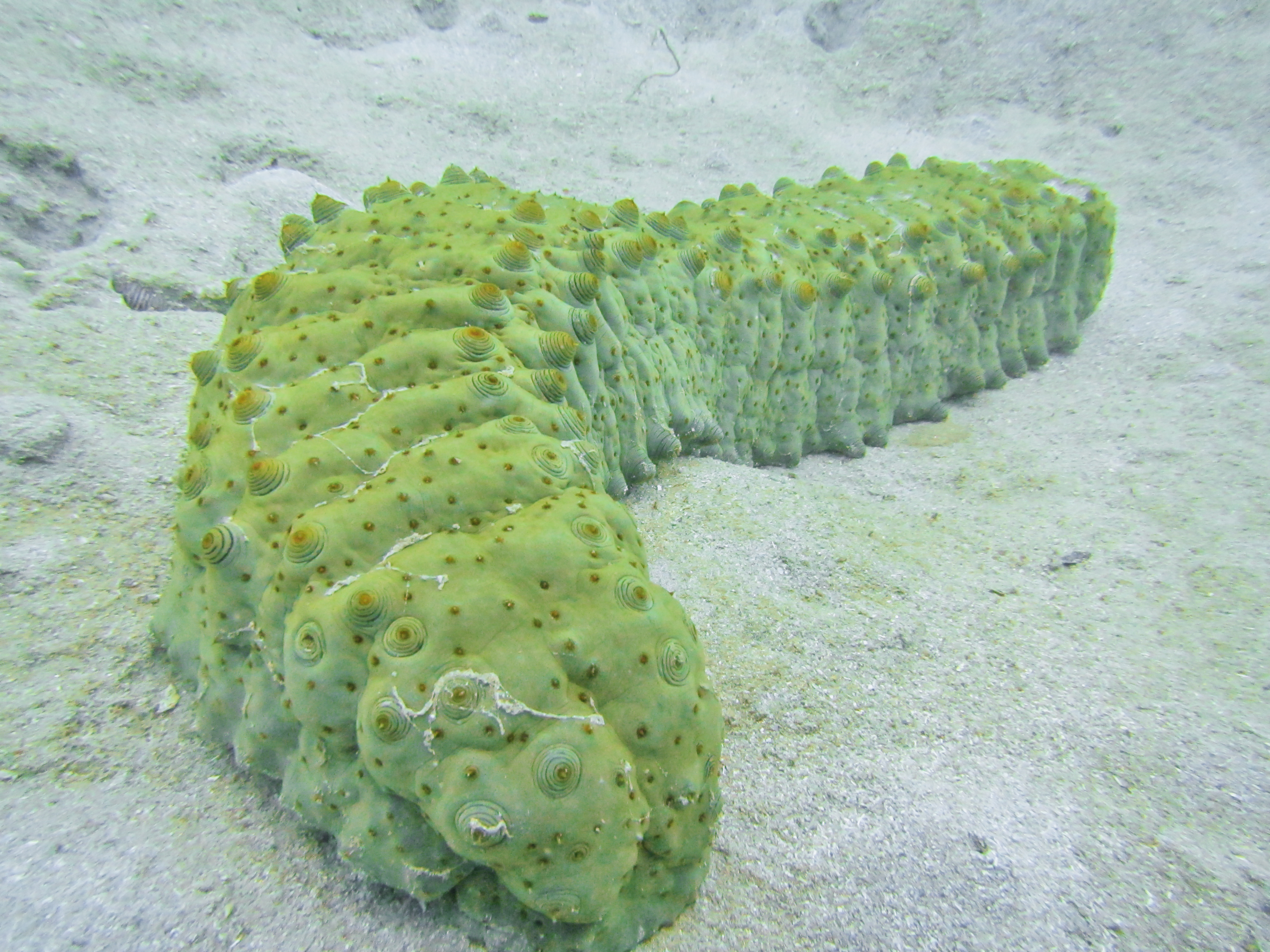
- Stichopus herrmanni

Scientific classification
- Kingdom: Animalia
- Phylum: Echinodermata
- Class: Holothuroidea
- Order: Synallactida
- Family: Stichopodidae
- Genus: Stichopus; Brandt, 1835

Species
- See text

= Stichopus =

Genus of sea cucumbers

Stichopus is a genus of sea cucumbers from the family Stichopodidae.

== Description and characteristics ==
Sources disagree about how many species should be classified in the genus. By 1922 there were about 20 described. Current species counts range from about 8 to 14. A number of animals have been moved to other genera, such as Apostichopus and Isostichopus.

These sea cucumbers are relatively large. One of the largest is S. vastus, which can reach 40 to 50 centimeters in length. They have soft, quadrangular bodies covered on all four sides with thick tubercles. Some of them can be quite variable, especially in their coloration. S. rubermaculosus, for example, can be light yellow to dark green with patches of various colors. Species also often differ in color from each other. One of the most distinctive is S. chloronotus, which is black, tinged with green or blue. Some of its body tubercles are tipped with orange. S. vastus looks "like a giant caterpillar" with yellow and green zebra stripes.

Many sea cucumbers are valued as food and as a source of medicine, and Stichopus is a commonly exploited genus. S. monotuberculatus is used for both food and medicine. Stichopus species are important in traditional medicine practices in Malaysia. There they are known as gamat, and they are used to make "gamat water" and "gamat oil", which are tonics for treating wounds, gastric ulcers, and pain. One species fished as gamat is S. horrens. This species is also harvested for food in Samoa. The parts considered edible are the viscera, especially the intestine. A fisher will take the cucumber from the water and place it in a bucket for a few hours to let it pass any sand from its gut. The fisher will then cut out its intestine and sometimes its respiratory system and gonads, as well, and release the still-living animal. The viscera are eaten raw and fresh, or bottled and sold in the community. Apparently, most cucumbers survive this treatment, at least in the short term.

There was a small fishery for S. herrmanni, but it crashed due to overfishing.

== List of species ==
The following species are recognised in the genus Stichopus:

- Stichopus chloronotus Brandt, 1835 - greenfish
- Stichopus fusiformiossa Woo in Woo et al., 2015
- Stichopus herrmanni Semper, 1868 - curryfish
- Stichopus horrens Selenka, 1867 - warty sea cucumber, peanutfish, flemfish, Selenka's sea cucumber
- Stichopus monotuberculatus (Quoy & Gaimard, 1834)
- Stichopus naso Semper, 1868
- Stichopus noctivagus Cherbonnier, 1980 - night-wandering sea cucumber
- Stichopus ocellatus Massin, Zulfigar, Hwai, Boss, 2002' - ocellated sea cucumber
- Stichopus pseudohorrens Cherbonnier, 1967
- Stichopus quadrifasciatus Massin, 1999
- Stichopus rubermaculosus Massin, Zulfigar, Hwai, Boss, 2002
- Stichopus vastus Sluiter, 1887
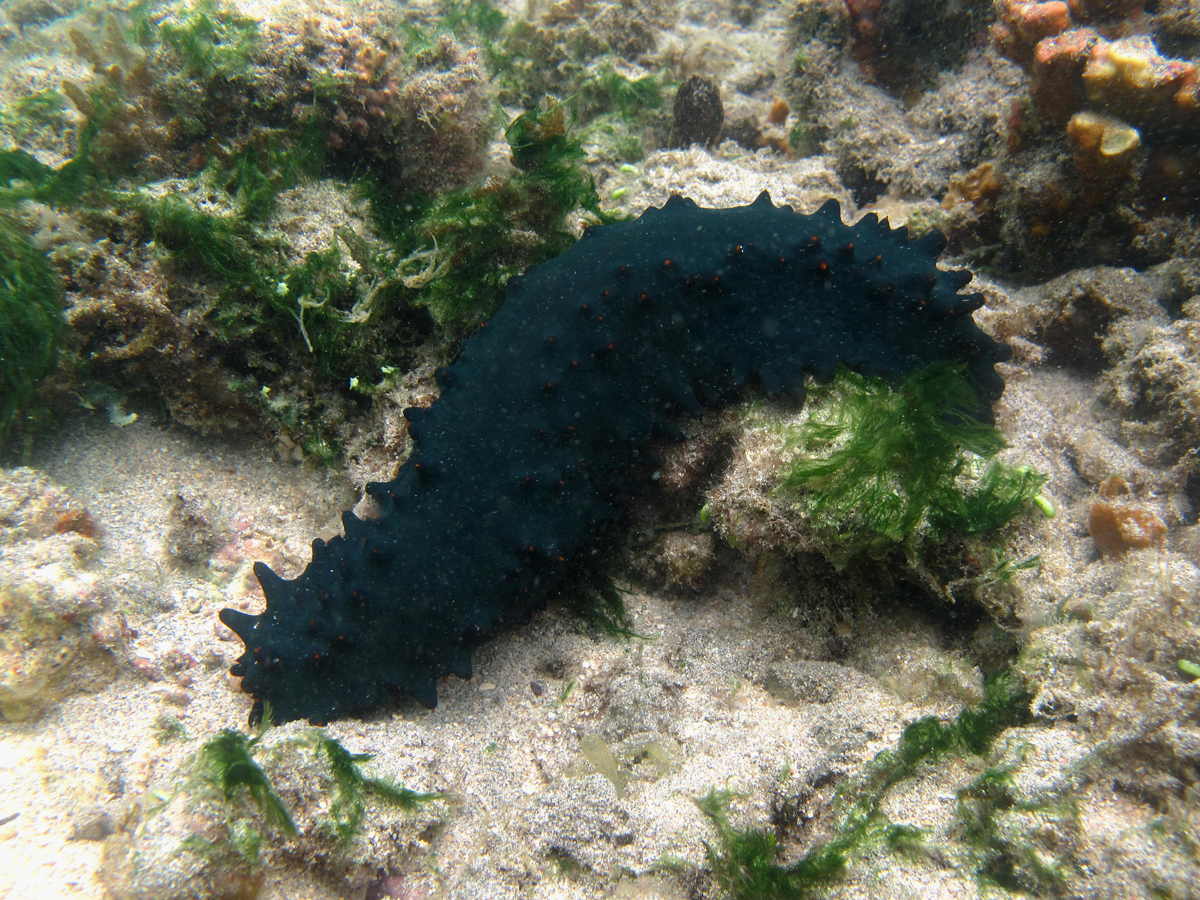
Stichopus chloronotus

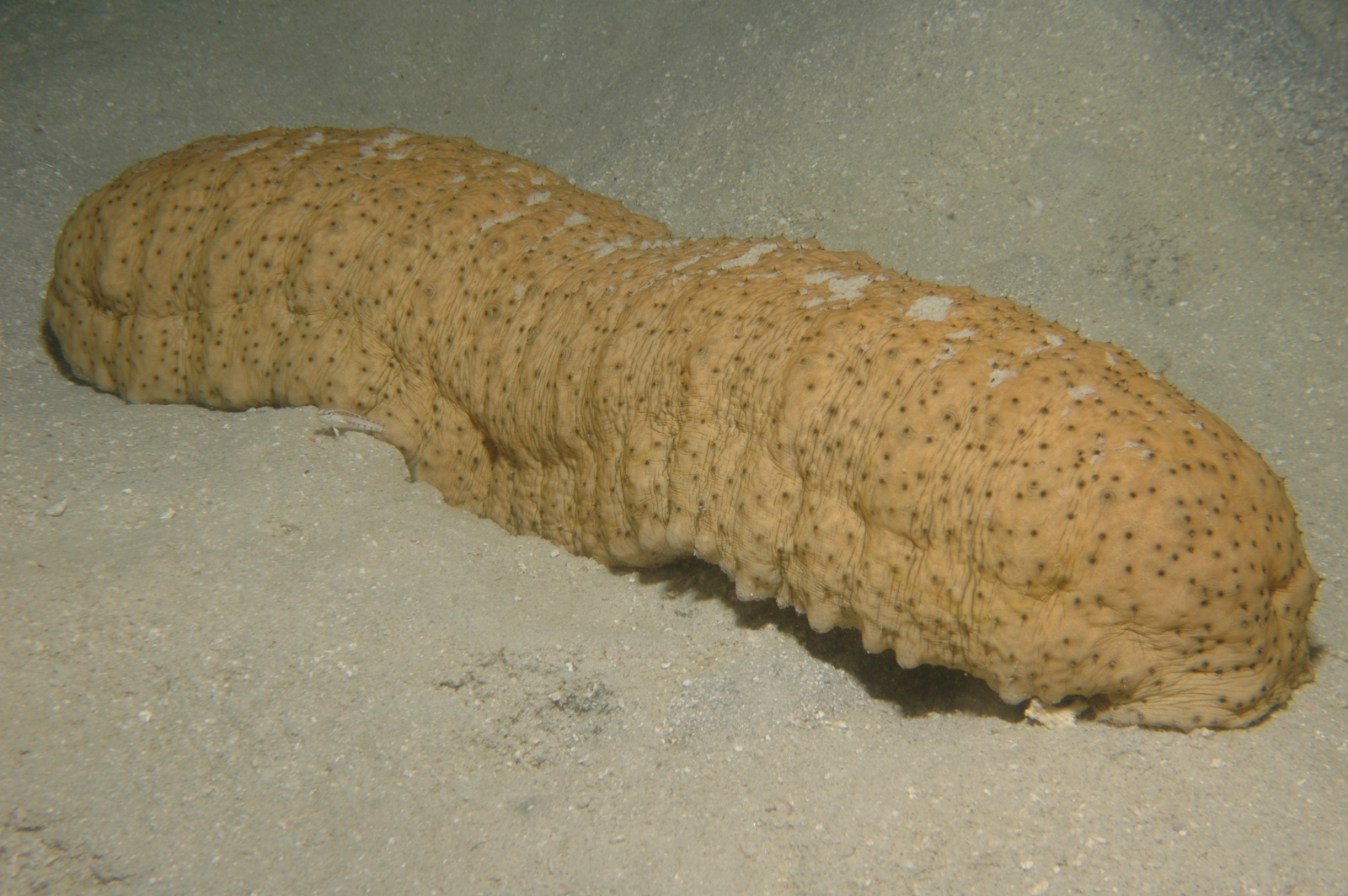
Stichopus herrmanni

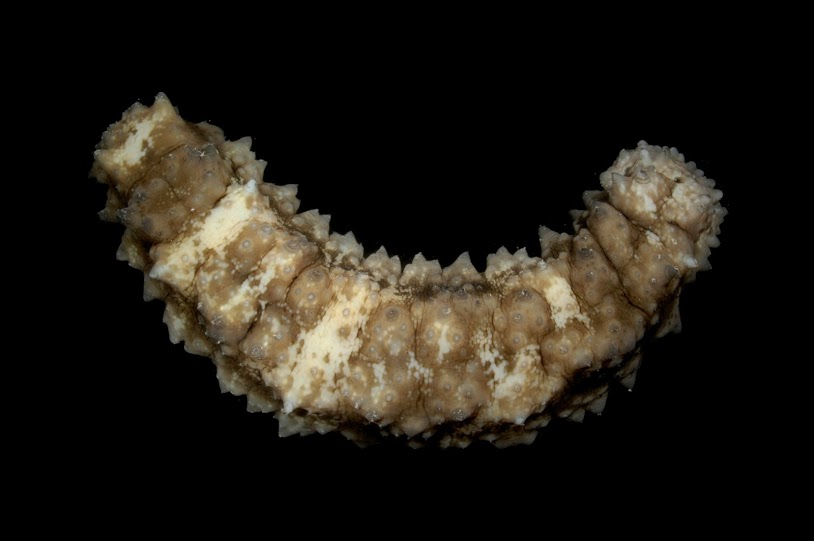
Stichopus horrens

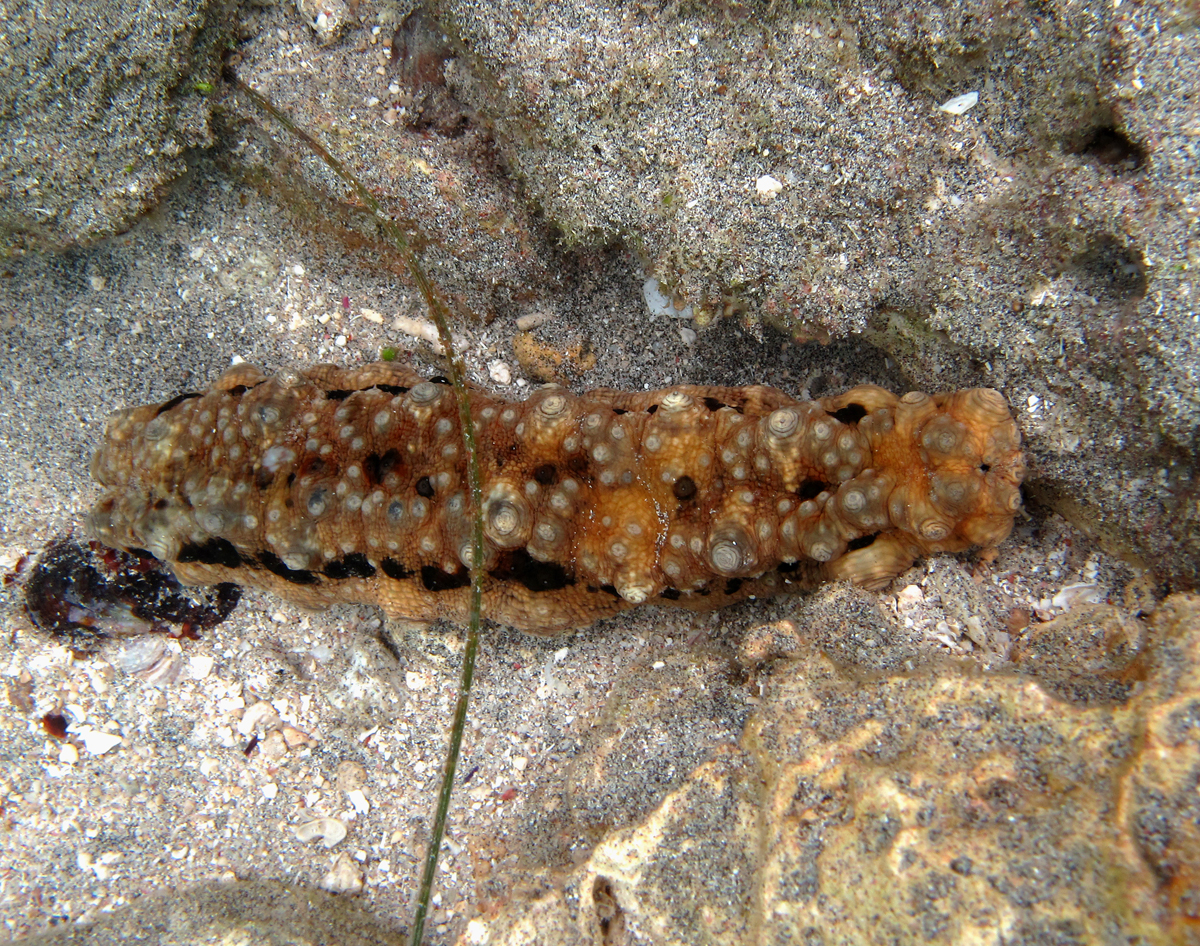
Stichopus monotuberculatus

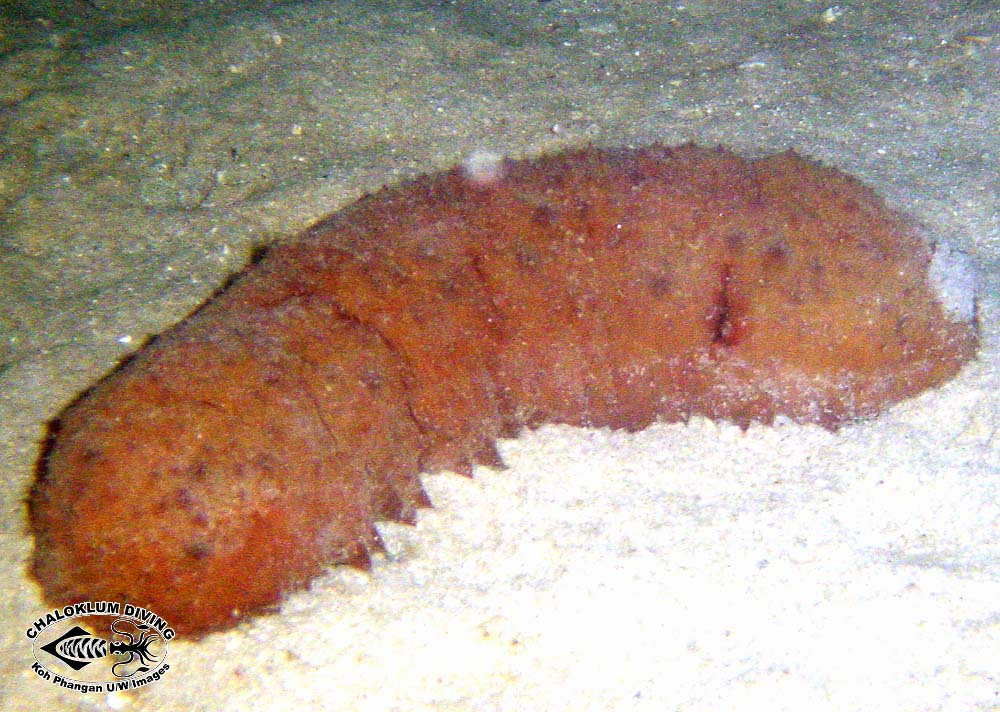
Stichopus noctivagus

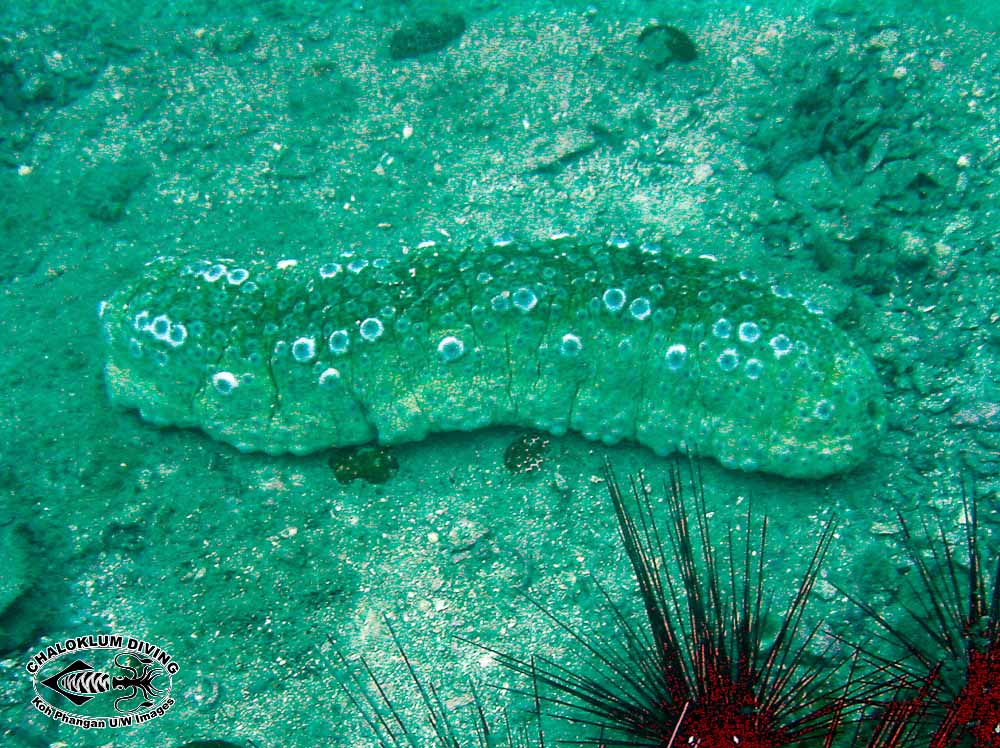
Stichopus ocellatus

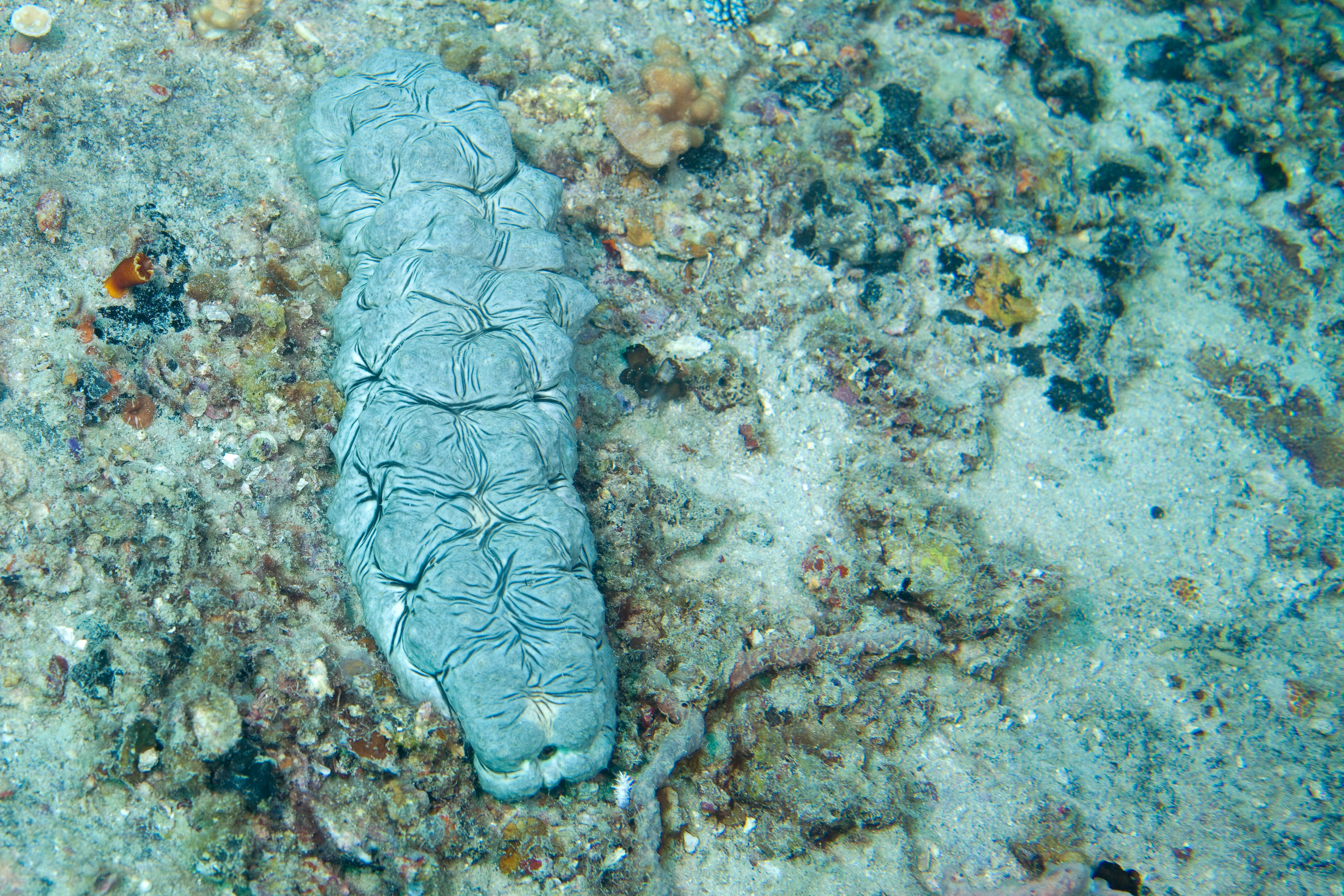
Stichopus vastus
