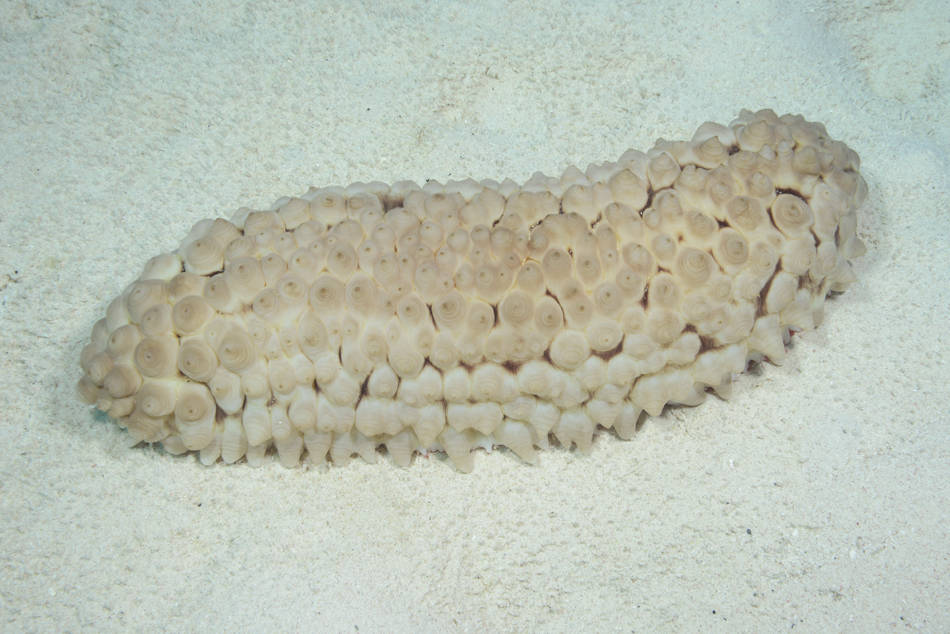
- Eostichopus arnesoni

Conservation status
- Data Deficient (IUCN 3.1)

Scientific classification
- Kingdom: Animalia
- Phylum: Echinodermata
- Class: Holothuroidea
- Order: Synallactida
- Family: Stichopodidae
- Genus: Eostichopus; Cutress & Miller, 1982
- Species: E. arnesoni

Binomial name
- Eostichopus arnesoni Cutress & Miller, 1982

= Eostichopus =

Genus of sea cucumbers

Eostichopus is a genus of sea cucumbers belonging to the family Stichopodidae. It is monotypic, being represented by the single species Eostichopus arnesoni which is found in Central America.
