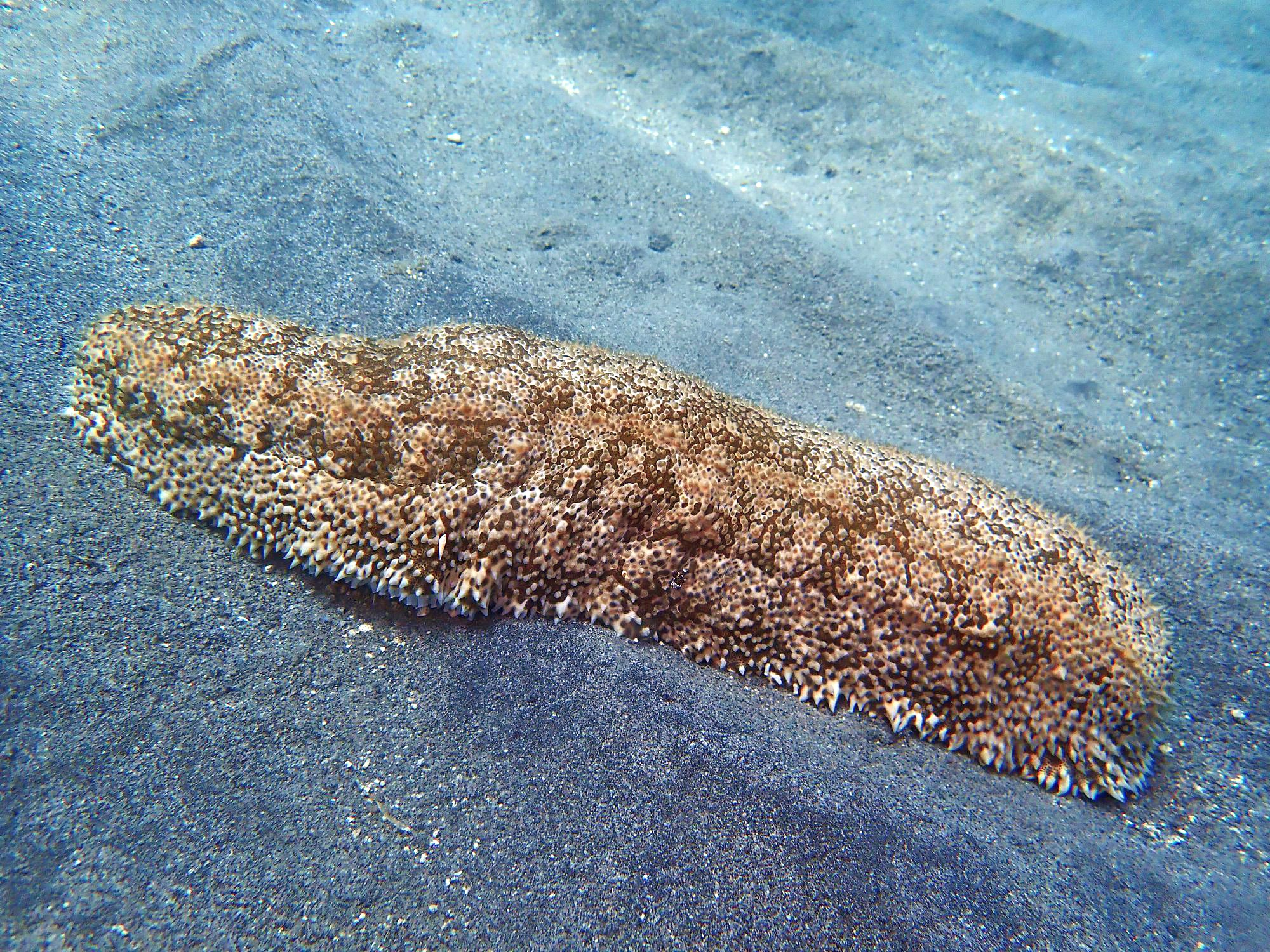
- Astichopus multifidus in Martinique.

Conservation status
- Least Concern (IUCN 3.1)

Scientific classification
- Kingdom: Animalia
- Phylum: Echinodermata
- Class: Holothuroidea
- Order: Synallactida
- Family: Stichopodidae
- Genus: Astichopus; Clark, 1922
- Species: A. multifidus

Binomial name
- Astichopus multifidus (Sluiter, 1910)

Synonyms
- Stichopus multifidus Sluiter, 1910

= Astichopus =

Genus of sea cucumbers

Astichopus is a monotypic genus of sea cucumbers, the only species in the genus being Astichopus multifidus. It is commonly known as the furry sea cucumber or the fissured sea cucumber and is native to the Caribbean Sea.

== Description ==
Astichopus multifidus is a robust, soft-bodied species growing to a maximum length of 40 cm (16 in) and width of 10 cm (4 in). Both its dorsal and ventral surfaces are uniformly covered with hundreds of tube feet, those on the dorsal surface being extended into papillae, fleshy conical projections about 1 cm (0.4 in) long with tube feet at their tips. This sea cucumber is chocolate brown or dark grey, sometimes mottled with paler patches or speckled with many small white spots.

== Distribution and habitat ==
Astichopus multifidus is native to the Caribbean region. Its range includes the West Indies, the southern tip of Florida, the Dry Tortugas and the region of the Campeche Bank and southwards to Colombia and Venezuela. It is found on sandy seabeds near reefs and occasionally in seagrass meadows, at depths ranging between 10 and 30 m (33 and 98 ft).

Furry Sea Cucumber (Astichopus multifidus) crawling in the shallows on Bonaire (Caribbean Netherlands) in November 2026.

== Biology ==
Astichopus multifidus spends the day buried in the sand, emerging at night to feed. It is a scavenger and detritivore and ingests large quantities of sediment from which organic matter is extracted as it passes through its gut. It can move much more rapidly than most sea cucumbers and can cover almost 2 m (10 ft) in a minute. Locomotion is mostly by crawling or rolling, but fast progress can be made by "bounding".

== Status ==
The IUCN has rated Astichopus multifidus as being of "Least Concern". Other species of sea cucumber found in the Caribbean have been more heavily exploited than this species, but as stocks get depleted, it can be expected to be increasingly targeted. The population trend of Astichopus multifidus is unknown but its range includes some protected areas, and the gathering of sea cucumbers is illegal in Panama, Costa Rica and Venezuela.
