= C. tumescens =

C. tumescens may refer to:

- Chonetes tumescens, an extinct species of brachiopod.
- Chorigyne tumescens, a species of plant.
- Chrysogaster tumescens, a species of hoverflies.
- Clypeaster humilis (synonym Clypeaster tumescens), a species of sea urchin.
- Corymbia tumescens, a species of tree.
- Cymbella tumescens, a species of diatom.
- Cymus tumescens, a species of true bug.
- Terrabacter tumescens (formerly Corynebacterium tumescens), a Gram-positive bacterium.
