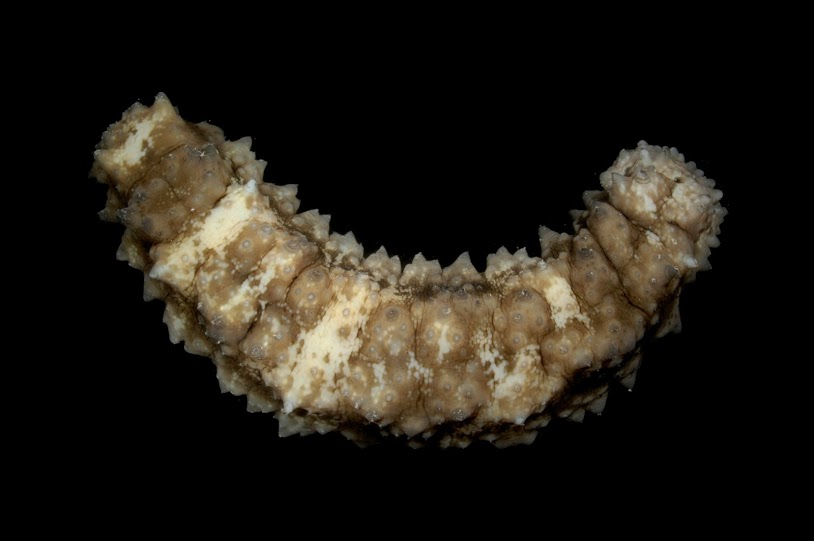

Conservation status
- Data Deficient (IUCN 3.1)

Scientific classification
- Kingdom: Animalia
- Phylum: Echinodermata
- Class: Holothuroidea
- Order: Synallactida
- Family: Stichopodidae
- Genus: Stichopus
- Species: S. horrens

Binomial name
- Stichopus horrens Selenka, 1867

= Stichopus horrens =

Species of sea cucumber

Stichopus horrens is a variable, grey to green/black sea cucumber from the Indo-Pacific. It is often variegated with dark patches. It is a medium-sized species (to 30 cm) with a smooth tegument but large and irregular papillae. The big tubercles and irregular body form give an "irregular, soft and almost repulsive" appearance . Spicules are tables and large "C" bodies (S. horrens spicules). S. horrens many be found on reefs, below rocks on flats.
