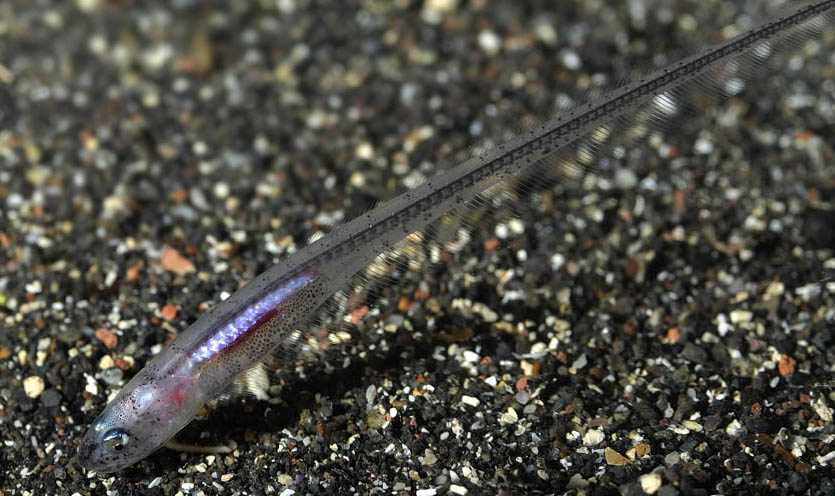

Conservation status
- Least Concern (IUCN 3.1)

Scientific classification
- Kingdom: Animalia
- Phylum: Chordata
- Class: Actinopterygii
- Order: Ophidiiformes
- Family: Carapidae
- Genus: Carapus
- Species: C. acus

Binomial name
- Carapus acus (Brünnich, 1768)

Synonyms
- Carapus birpex Arnold, 1956; Carapus cuspis Arnold, 1956; Carapus imberbis (Cuvier, 1815); Diaphasia acus (Brünnich, 1768); Encheliophis tenuis Putnam, 1874; Fierasfer acus (Brünnich, 1768); Fierasfer fontanesii (Risso, 1810); Fierasfer imberbis (Cuvier, 1815); Fierasfer maculata Swainson, 1839; Gymnotus acus Brünnich, 1768; Notopterus fontanesii Risso, 1810; Ophidium fierasfer Risso, 1827; Ophidium imberbe Cuvier, 1815; Porobronchus linearis Kaup, 1860; Vexillifer dephilippii Gasco, 1870

= Carapus acus =

Species of bony fish

Carapus acus is a species of bony fish in the family Carapidae, the pearlfishes, and is native to the Mediterranean Sea and the Atlantic Ocean. It lives as a commensal in association with a sea cucumber, spending the day inside its host and emerging at night to feed.

== Description ==
Carapus acus is a laterally-compressed, elongated fish growing to a length of about 20 cm (8 in). The head measures about one eighth of the total length and there are 84 to 92 vertebrae, which gives the fish great flexibility. The continuous dorsal fin and the anal fin run the whole length of the body. There is no caudal fin and the tail ends with a point. The gut loops back and the anus is located just behind the head, in front of the pectoral fins. This fish is translucent, with a number of silvery or reddish-gold iridescent spots on the operculum and the thoracic region. The peritoneum lining the body cavity is an opaque silvery colour.

== Distribution ==
Carapus acus is native to the Mediterranean Sea and eastern Atlantic Ocean; it is common in the western half and around the coasts of Spain, France, Italy, Sardinia and the Balearic Islands. It is less common in the Adriatic and Aegean Seas.

== Ecology ==
Carapus acus usually lives inside the respiratory tree or the body cavity of sea cucumbers. Neither the species nor the size of the host seem important in host choice, and the fish makes use of whatever sea cucumber it happens to encounter; the most common hosts are Parastichopus regalis and Holothuria tubulosa, while others include, H. poli, H. arguinensis, H. sanctori and H. mammata. The fish swims close to the seabed searching for a suitable host. When it finds one, it positions its head beside the sea cucumber's anus, from which a current of water is being expelled. Either it then bends its flexible tail around, inserts it in the sea cucumber's anus and works its way backwards inside, with the tail entering first, or less commonly, it thrusts its head into the orifice and enters with a sharp flick of its tail, turning round when inside the host. In either case, it positions itself with its head close to or protruding from the sea cucumber's anus. Because the fish's anus is located just behind its head, it is able to defecate into the open water without fouling its host.

Pearlfishes are able to produce sounds by means of certain muscles connected to the swim bladder, with each species producing a sound unique to its species. The function of these sounds is unclear, various hypotheses have been proposed including finding a mate, indicating the size of the fish while it is concealed in its host, and establishing a territory. Sometimes more than one fish can occupy the same host, and mating inside the host is possible. Breeding takes place between July and September. A cluster of eggs is produced which rises to the water surface. The eggs hatch into fish fry after three days. When these larvae have grown to a length of about 80 mm (3 in) they undergo metamorphosis into juveniles, becoming elongated and laterally flattened. At this time they move to the seabed to find a suitable host. Juvenile fish may nibble the reproductive organs or the gills of their host; this causes little damage because sea cucumbers have great regenerative powers. Older fish are nocturnal, emerging from their host and feeding on small crustaceans, worms, and fish fry, before returning to their hosts.
