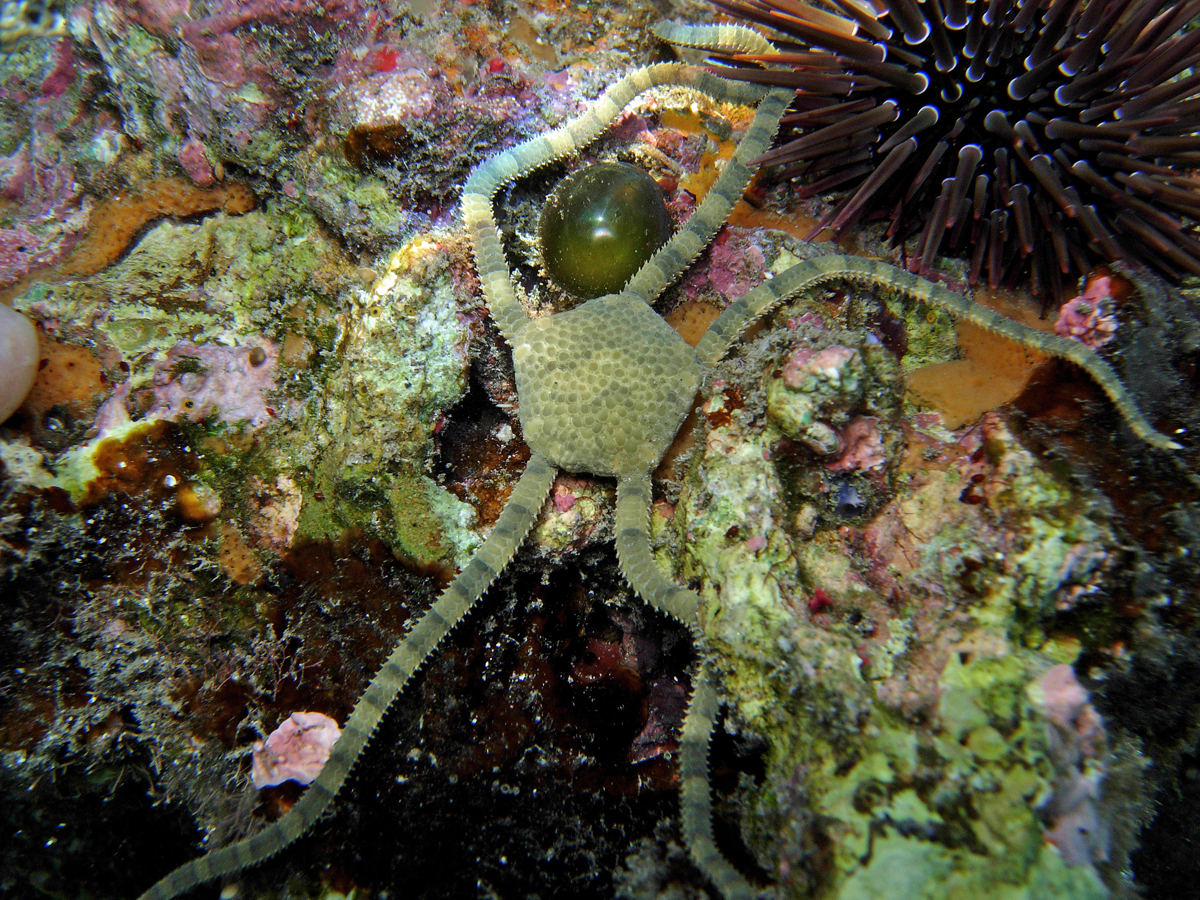
- At La Réunion

Scientific classification
- Kingdom: Animalia
- Phylum: Echinodermata
- Class: Ophiuroidea
- Order: Amphilepidida
- Family: Ophiolepididae
- Genus: Ophiolepis
- Species: O. cincta

Binomial name
- Ophiolepis cincta Müller & Troschel, 1842

= Ophiolepis cincta =

Species of brittle star

Ophiolepis cincta is a brittle star in the family Ophiolepididae, first described in 1842 by Johannes Peter Müller and Franz Hermann Troschel.

Ophiolepis garretti is said to be a synonym, but this is disputed.

== Distribution ==
In Australia this brittle star is found at depths of 0-30 m off the coasts of the Northern Territory, Queensland, and Western Australia, from Rowley Shoals, WA to Swain Reefs in Queensland.

Elsewhere, it is found in tropical intertidal and subtidal waters in Indian Ocean and west and central Pacific Ocean.
