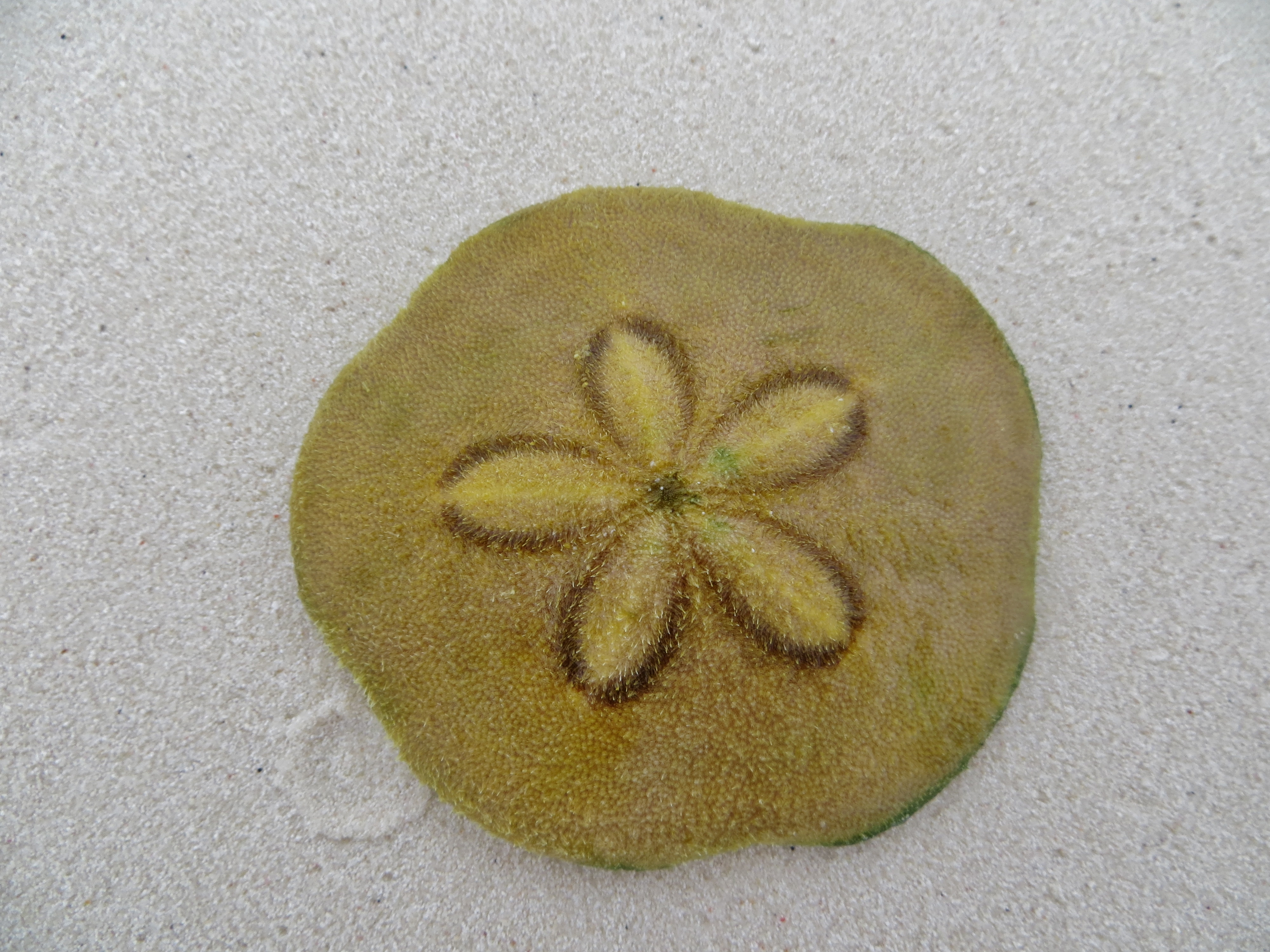

Scientific classification
- Kingdom: Animalia
- Phylum: Echinodermata
- Class: Echinoidea
- Order: Clypeasteroida
- Family: Clypeasteridae
- Genus: Clypeaster
- Species: C. humilis

Binomial name
- Clypeaster humilis (Leske, 1778)

Synonyms
- Clypeaster ambigenus (Lamarck, 1816); Clypeaster latus Herklots, 1854; Clypeaster placunarius (Lamarck, 1816); Clypeaster rumphii Des Moulins, 1837; Clypeaster saisseti Michelin, 1861; Clypeaster tumescens Herklots, 1854; Echinanthus explanatus Gray, 1851; Echinanthus humilis Leske, 1778; Echinanthus placunarius (Lamarck, 1816); Echinanthus productus Gray, 1851; Echinodiscus placunarius (Lamarck, 1816); Scutella ambigena Lamarck, 1816; Scutella placunaria Lamarck, 1816; Stolonoclypus humilis (Leske, 1778)

= Clypeaster humilis =

Species of sea urchin

Clypeaster humilis is a species of sea urchin in the family Clypeasteridae. This species was first scientifically described in 1778 by the German biologist Nathanael Gottfried Leske. It occurs in the tropical Indo-Pacific region.

== Description ==
Clypeaster humilis is a medium-sized species of sea biscuit, growing to a maximum length of 160 mm (6 in). Its shape is pentagonal and it is slightly longer than it is broad. The margin is quite thick and the petaloid area is raised above the rest of the surface. The individual petals are closed and the petaloid area occupies less than half the width of the test. The oral (under) surface is somewhat concave and the food grooves are long and deeply incised. The spines are short, with the primaries hardly exceeding the length of the secondaries. When living, this sea biscuit is greenish-grey or brownish, the petaloid area sometimes being darker brown; the bare test is yellowish or beige.

== Distribution ==
This species is found in the western Indo-Pacific region, its range extending from the Red Sea and Persian Gulf to Malaysia, New Caledonia and northern Australia. It is found on sandy seabeds at depths down to about 216 m (709 ft).
