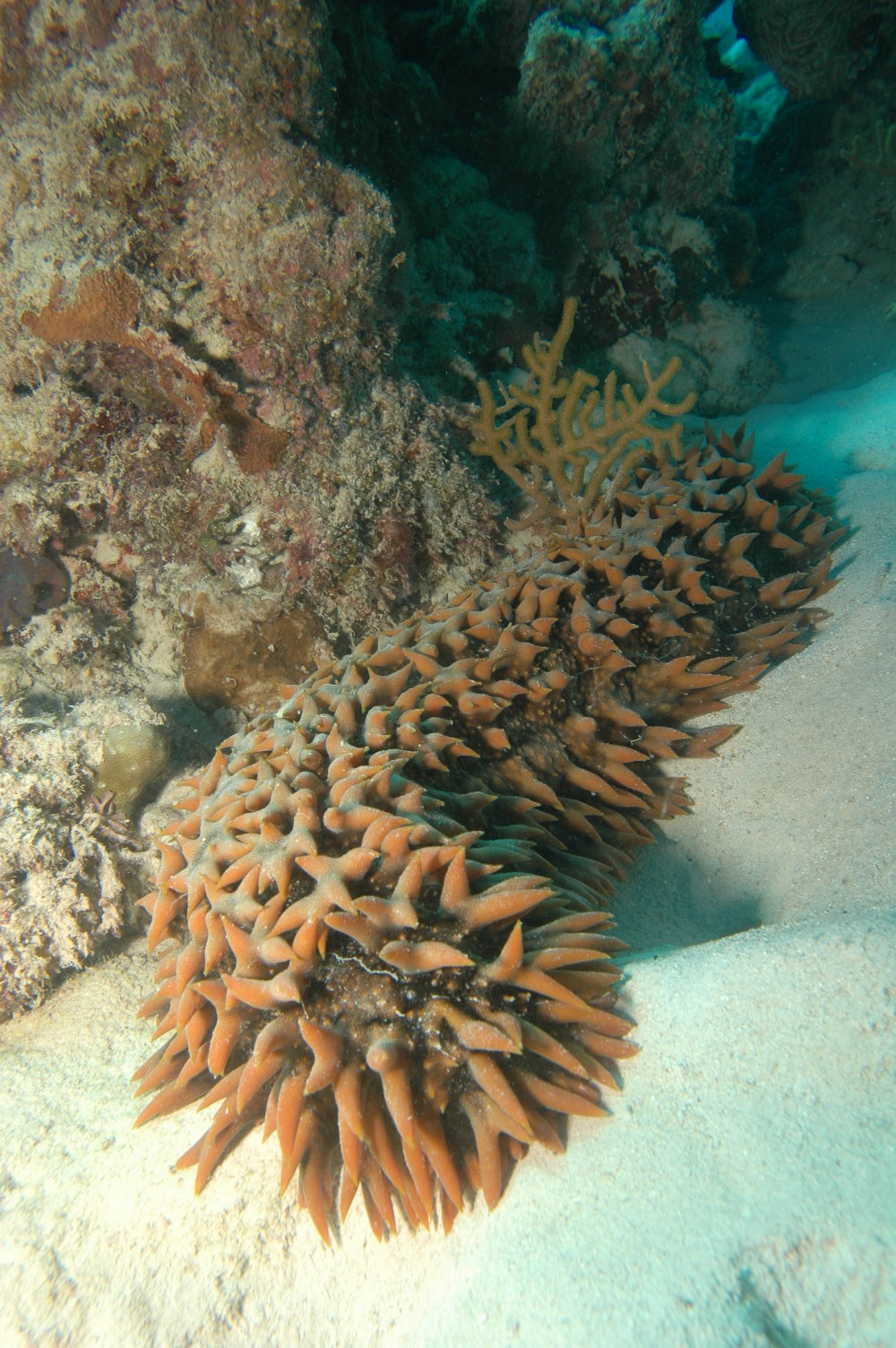
- Thelenota ananas

Scientific classification
- Kingdom: Animalia
- Phylum: Echinodermata
- Class: Holothuroidea
- Order: Synallactida
- Family: Stichopodidae; Haeckel, 1896

Genera
- See text

Synonyms
- Stichopoda Haeckel, 1896

= Stichopodidae =

Family of sea cucumbers

The Stichopodidae are a family of sea cucumbers, part of the order Synallactida.

== Description ==
Members of this family are mostly large or medium-sized holothuroids with an angular body shape (almost forming a squarish cross-section), a flat ventral surface, and large, fleshy, cone-shaped projections. Their mouths are surrounded by 20 peltate (shield-shaped) tentacles. They are usually found on soft substrates, such as fine sand or very fine rubble.

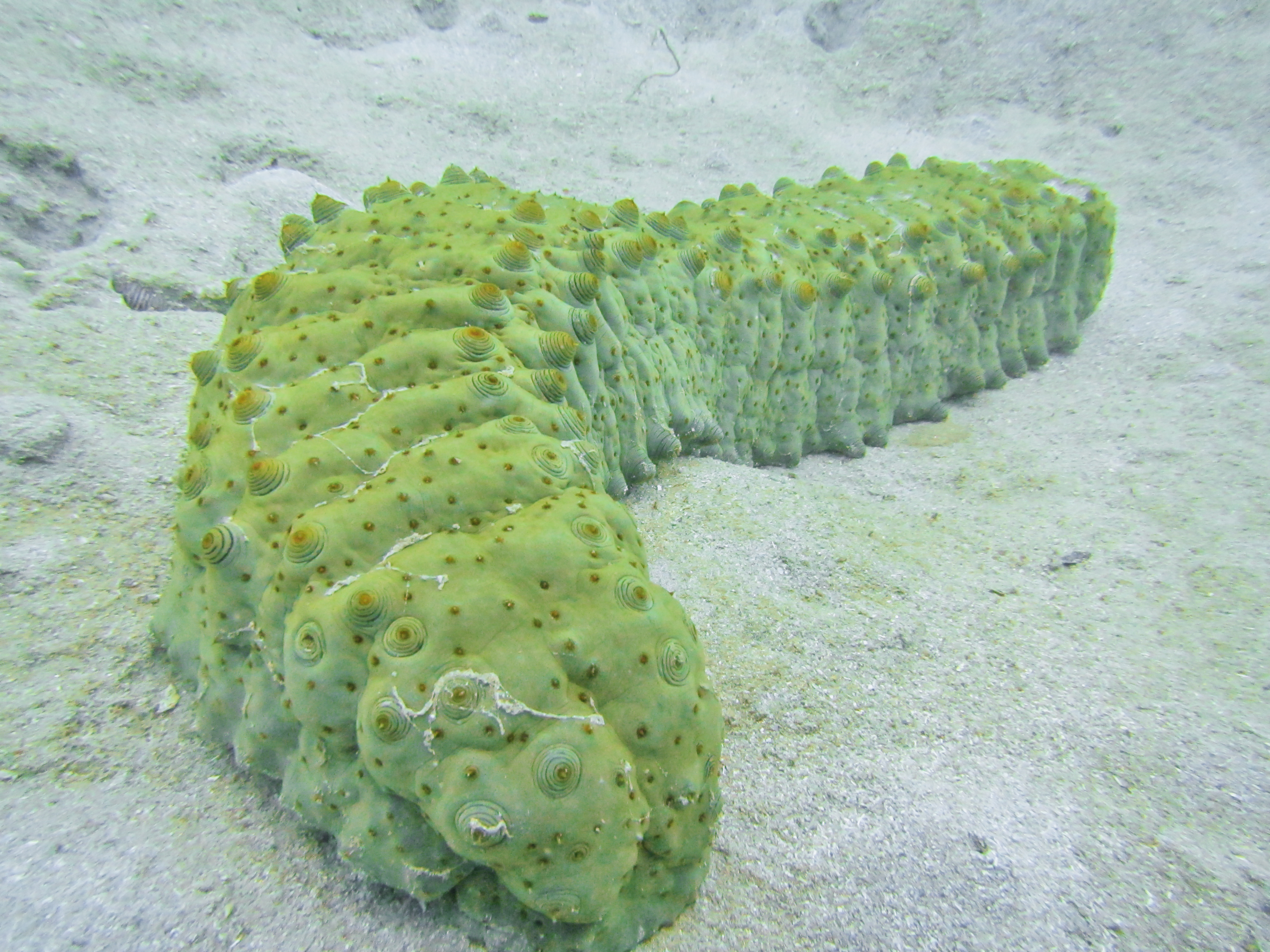
A typical stichopodid (Stichopus herrmanni) — massive sea cucumber, angular in cross-section, with thick papillae looking like tubercles.

== Genera ==
List of genera according to the World Register of Marine Species:

- genus Apostichopus Liao, 1980 (8 species, North Pacific)
- genus Astichopus Clark, 1922 (1 species, Caribbean)
- genus Australostichopus Levin in Moraes et al., 2004 (1 species, New Zealand and southern Australia)
- genus Eostichopus Cutress & Miller, 1982 (1 species, Caribbean)
- genus Isostichopus Deichmann, 1958 (3 species, warm East Pacific and Atlantic)
- genus Neostichopus Deichmann, 1948 (1 species, South Africa)
- genus Parastichopus Clark, 1922 (2 species, Atlantic and North Pacific)
- genus Stichopus Brandt, 1835 (13 species, Indo-Pacific)
- genus Thelenota Brandt, 1835 (3 species, Indo-Pacific)
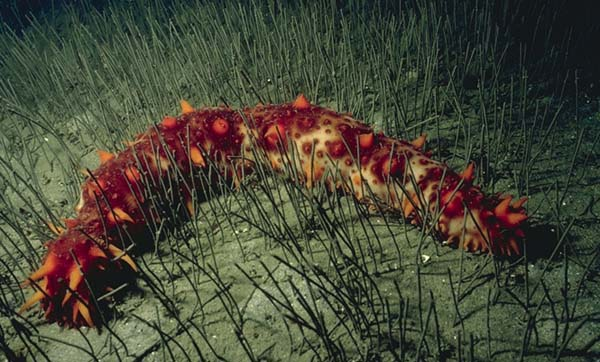
Apostichopus californicus

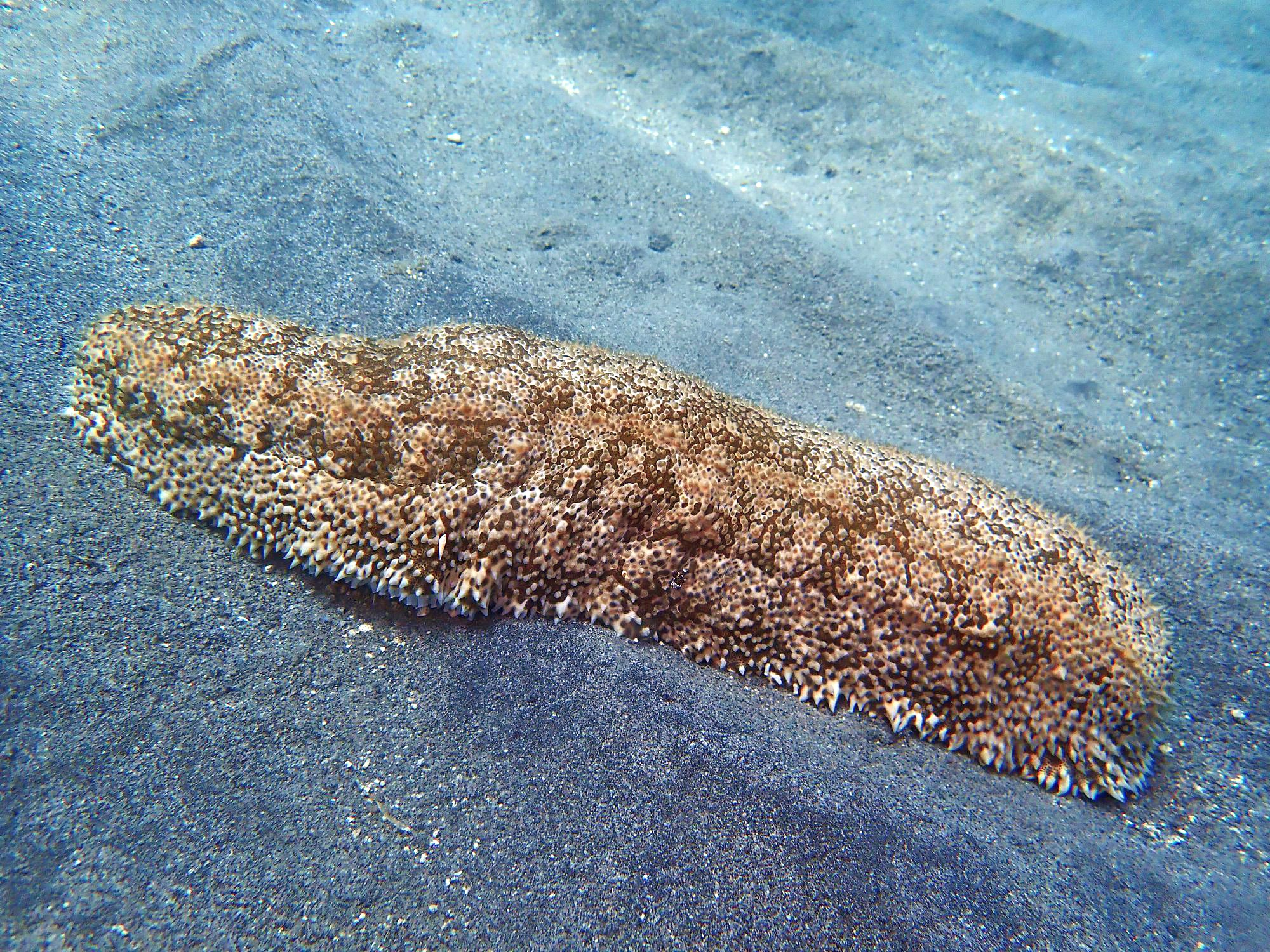
Astichopus multifidus

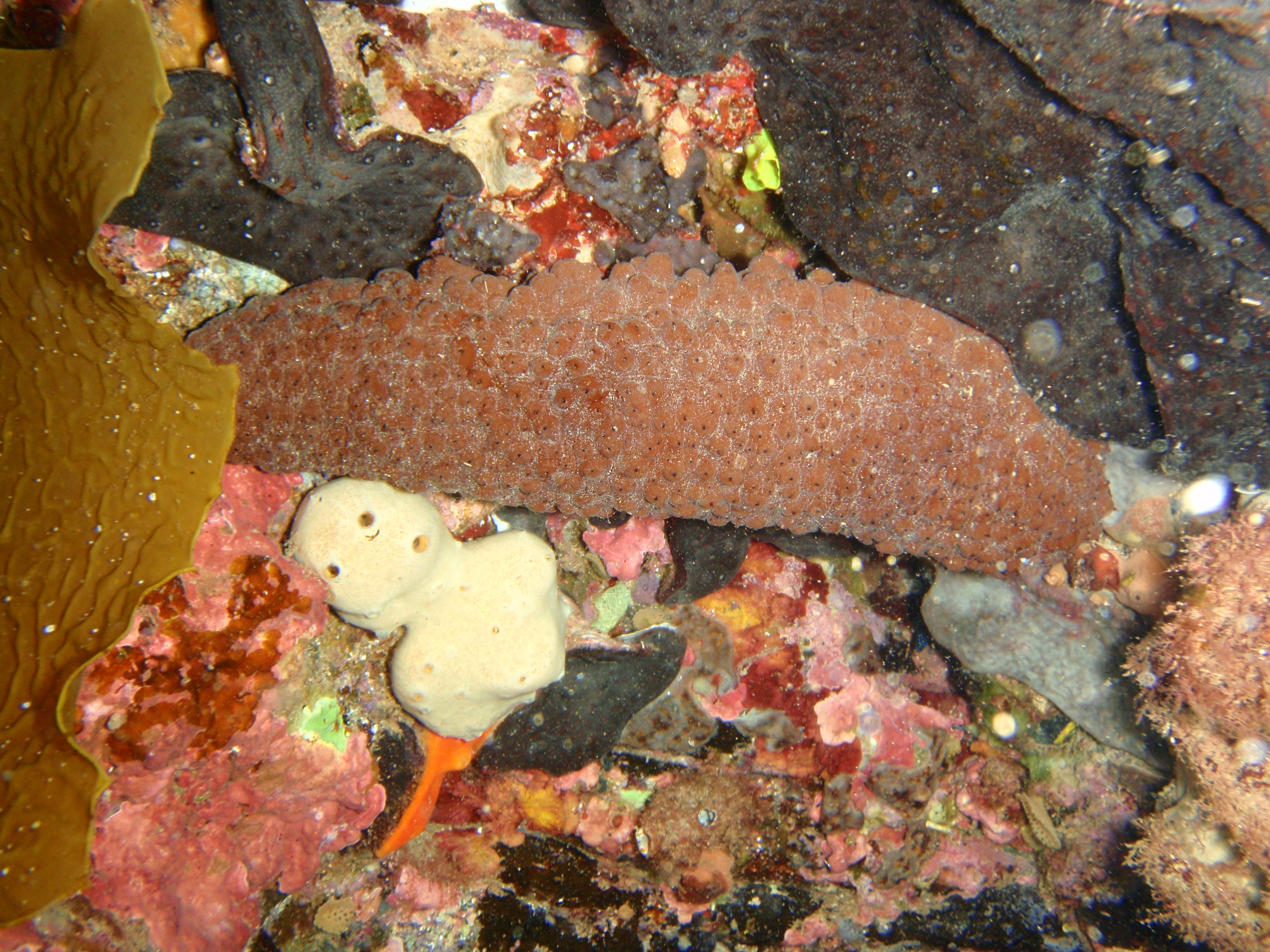
Australostichopus mollis

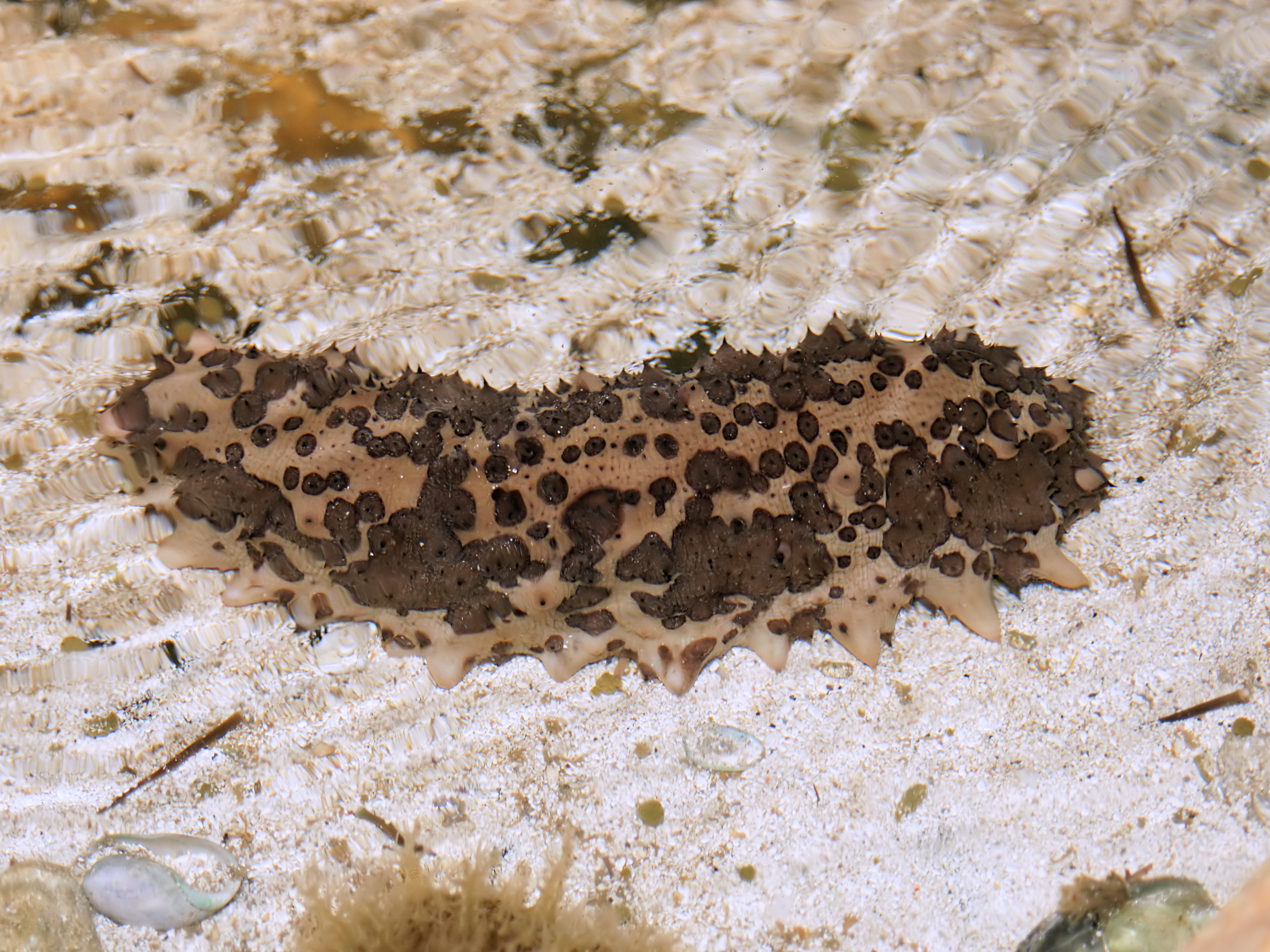
Isostichopus badionotus

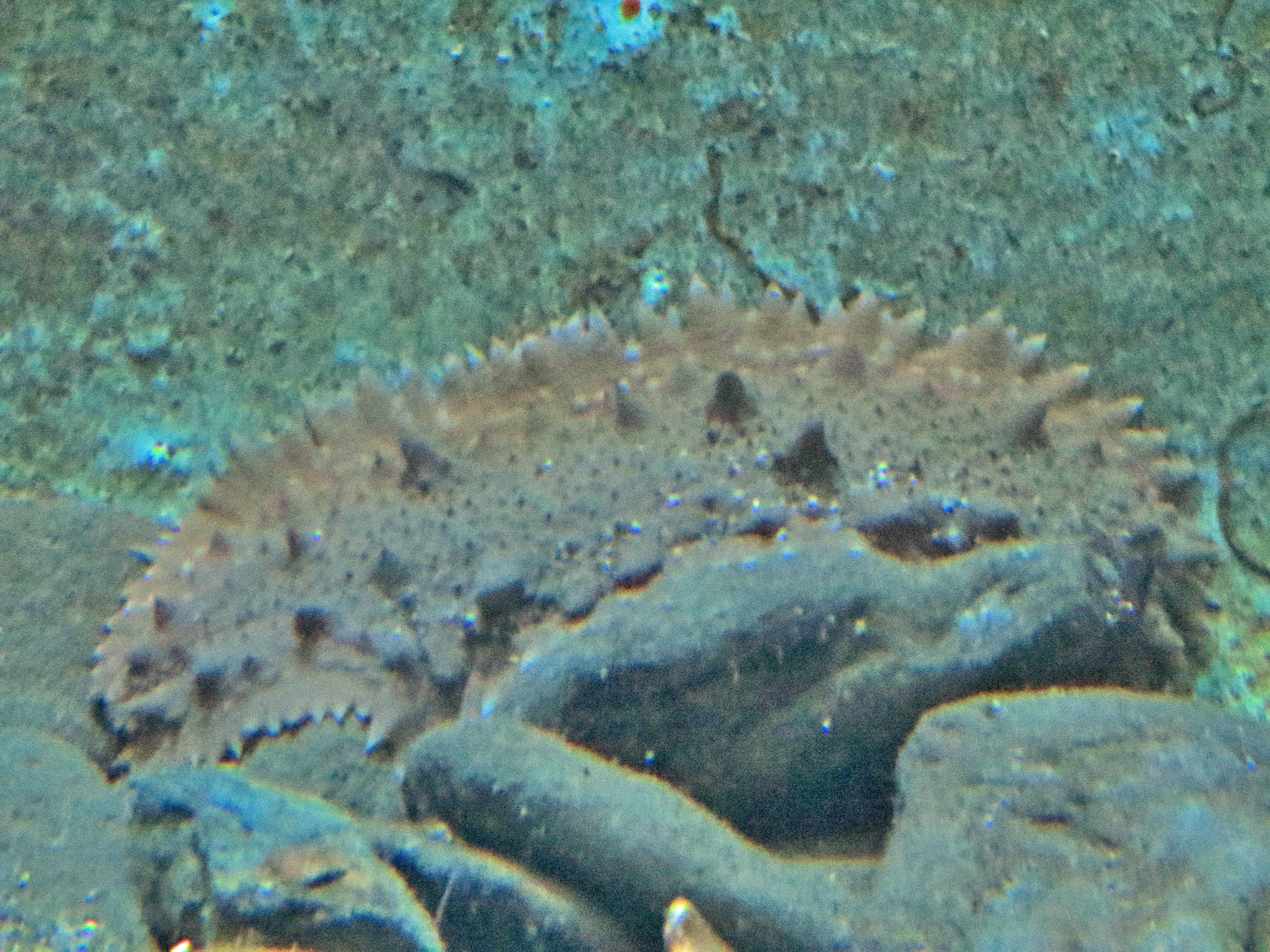
Parastichopus regalis

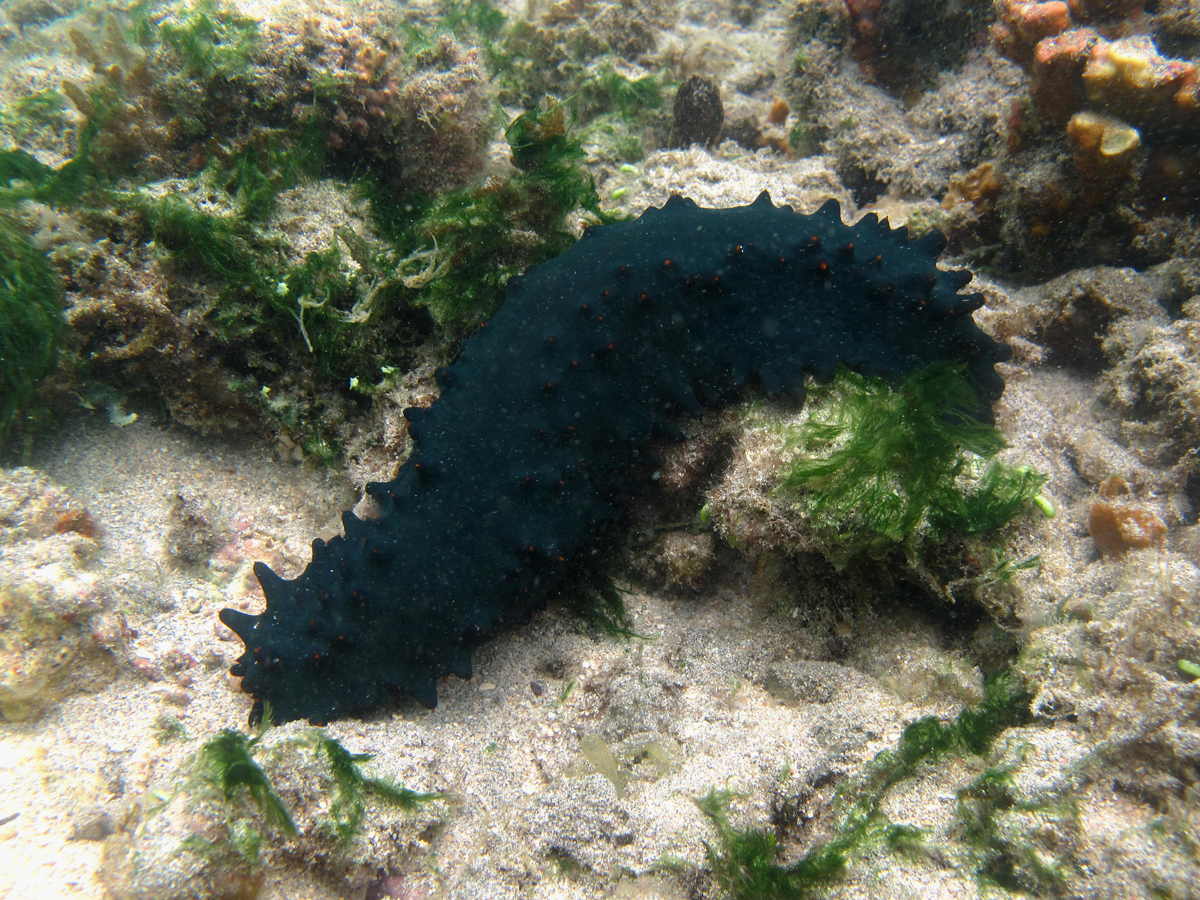
Stichopus chloronotus

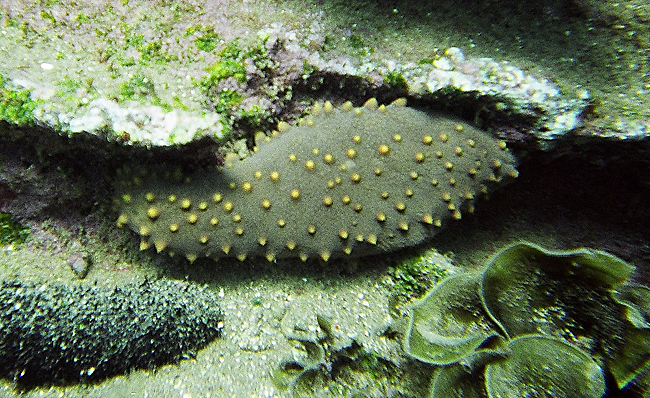
Isostichopus fuscus

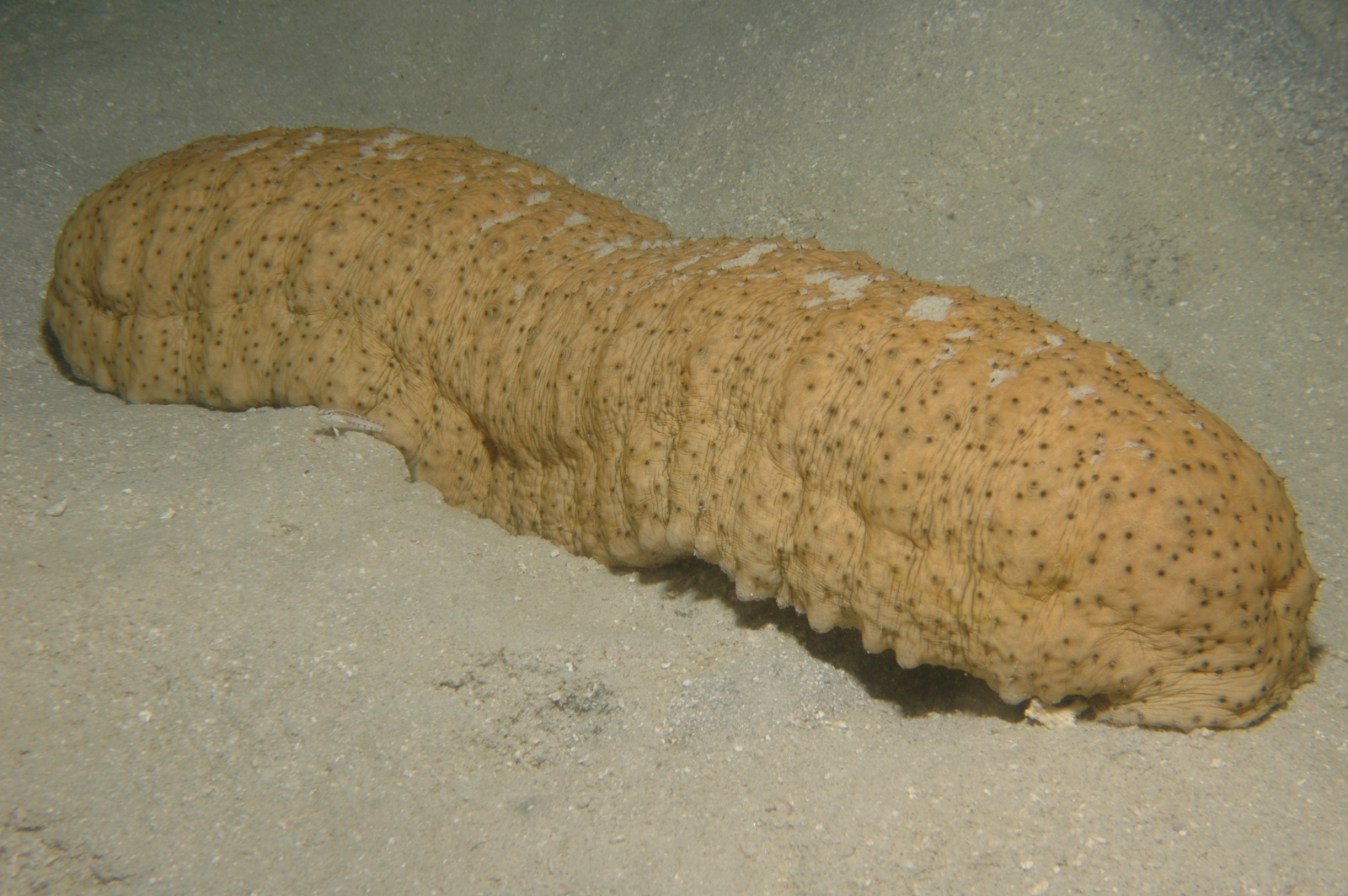
Stichopus herrmanni

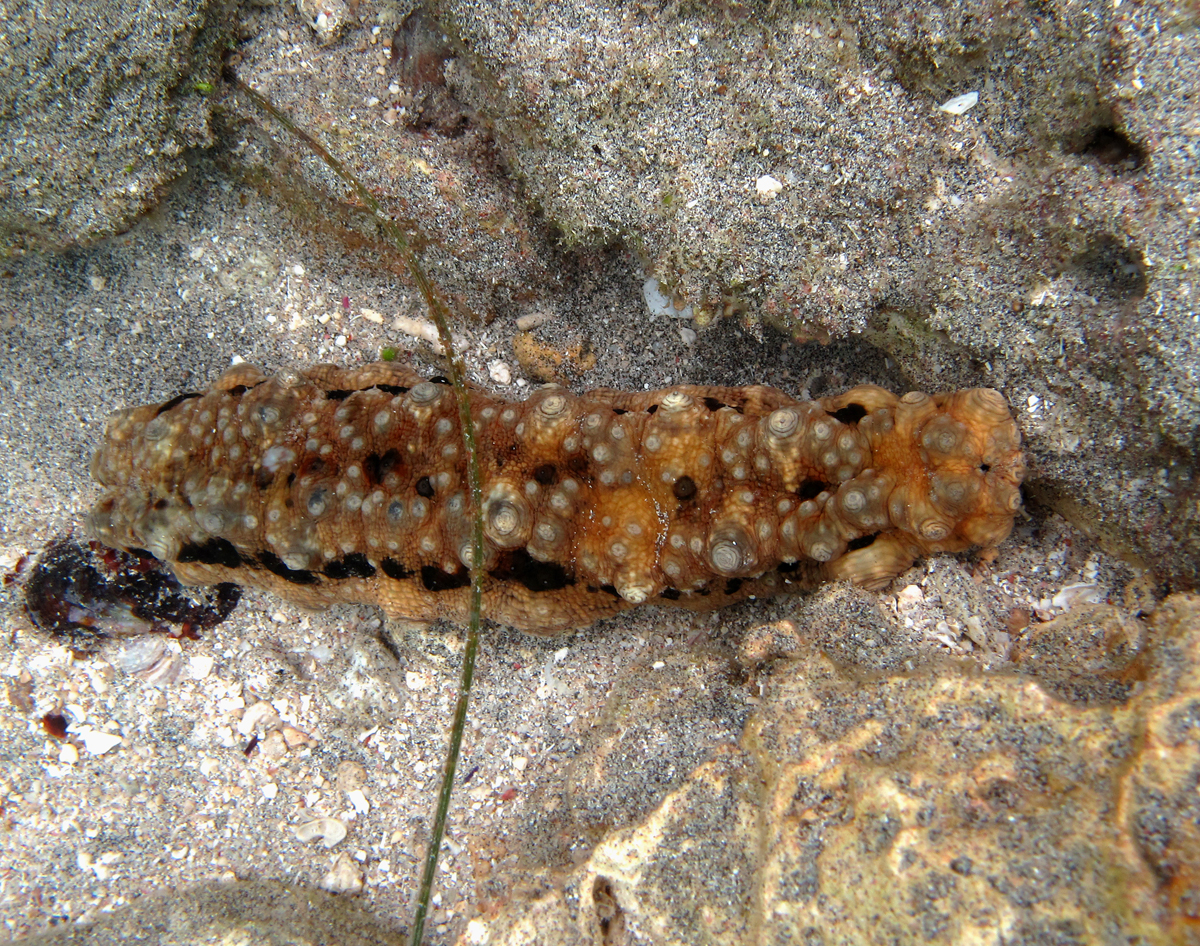
Stichopus monotuberculatus

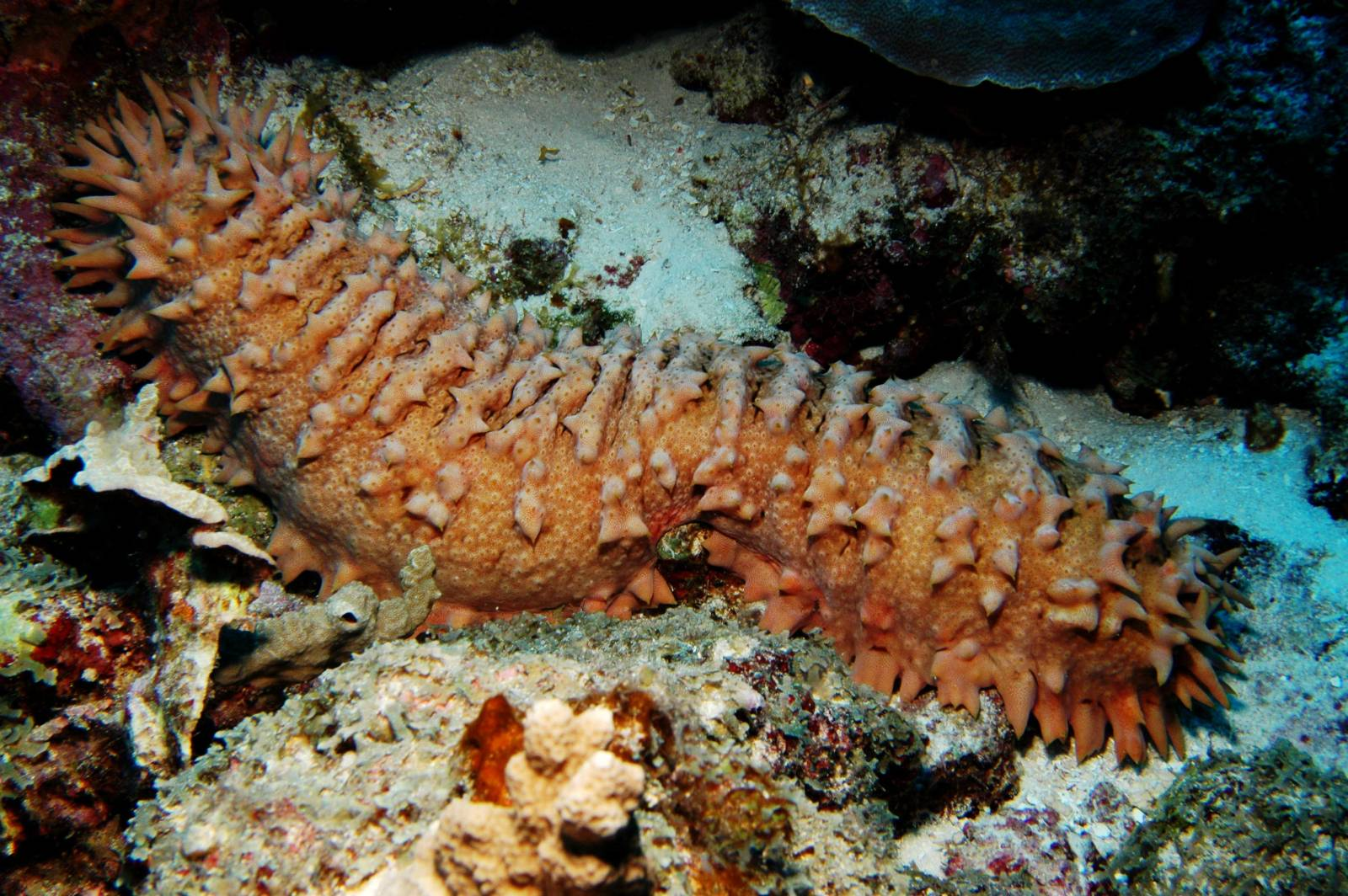
Thelenota ananas

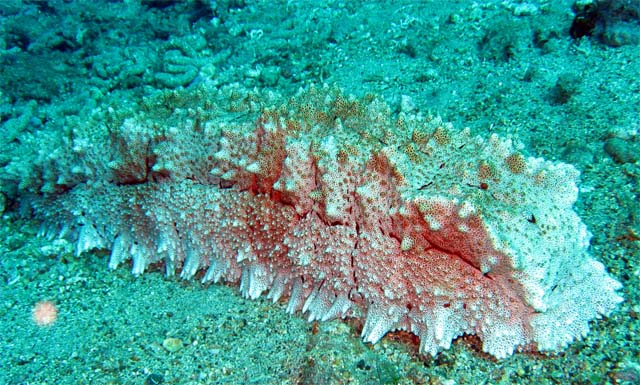
Thelenota anax
