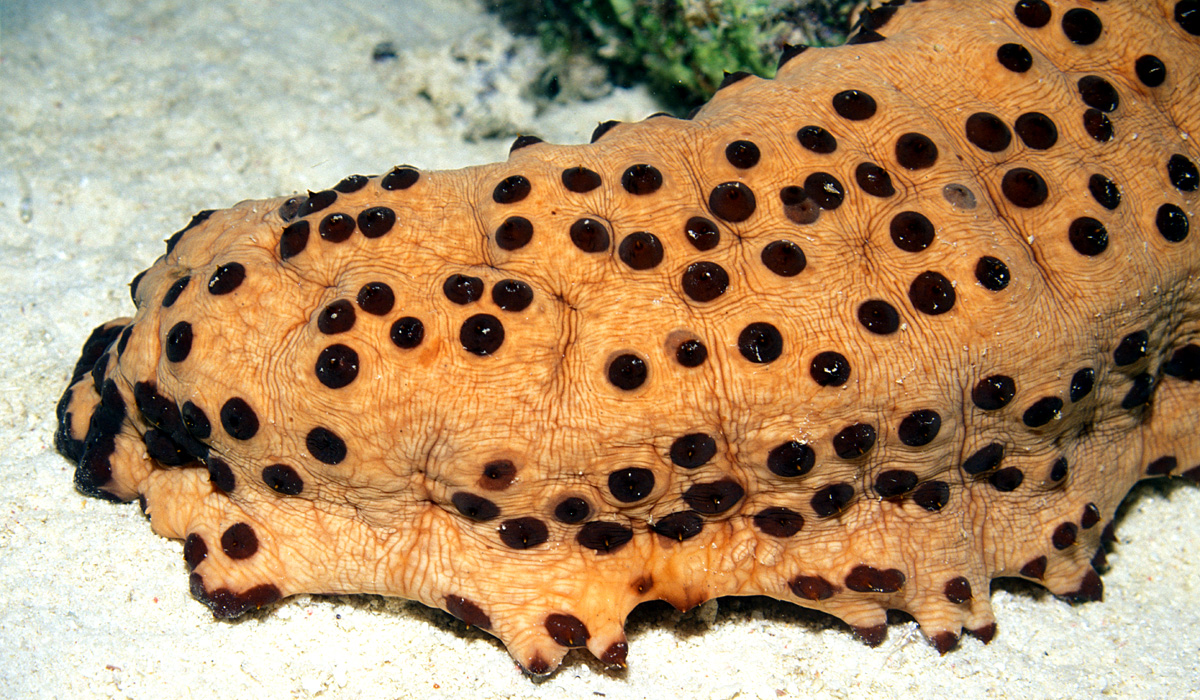
- Isostichopus badionotus, in family Stichopodidae

Scientific classification
- Kingdom: Animalia
- Phylum: Echinodermata
- Class: Holothuroidea
- Order: Synallactida; Miller, Kerr, Paulay, Reich, Wilson, Carvajal & Rouse, 2017

Families
- See text

= Synallactida =

Clade of sea cucumbers

Synallactida is a rankless clade of sea cucumbers, but is referred to as an order. Taxa within Synallactida were previously classified in an order called Aspidochirotida, which was determined to be polyphyletic in 2017.

== List of families ==
Synallactida includes over 130 species in three extant families and two extinct genera:

- Deimatidae Théel, 1882 – 3 genera
- Stichopodidae Haeckel, 1896 – 9 genera
- Synallactidae Ludwig, 1894 – 12 genera
- Genus †Collbatothuria Smith & Gallemí, 1991
- Genus †Tribrachiodemas Reich, 2010
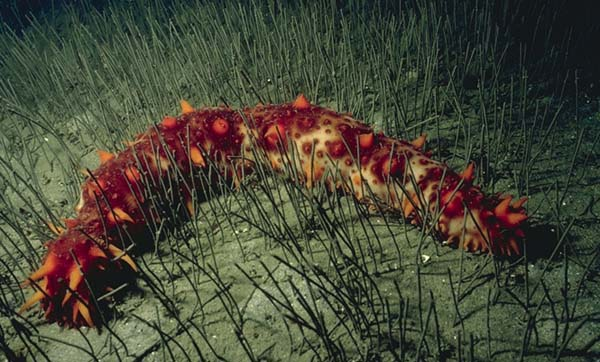
Apostichopus californicus

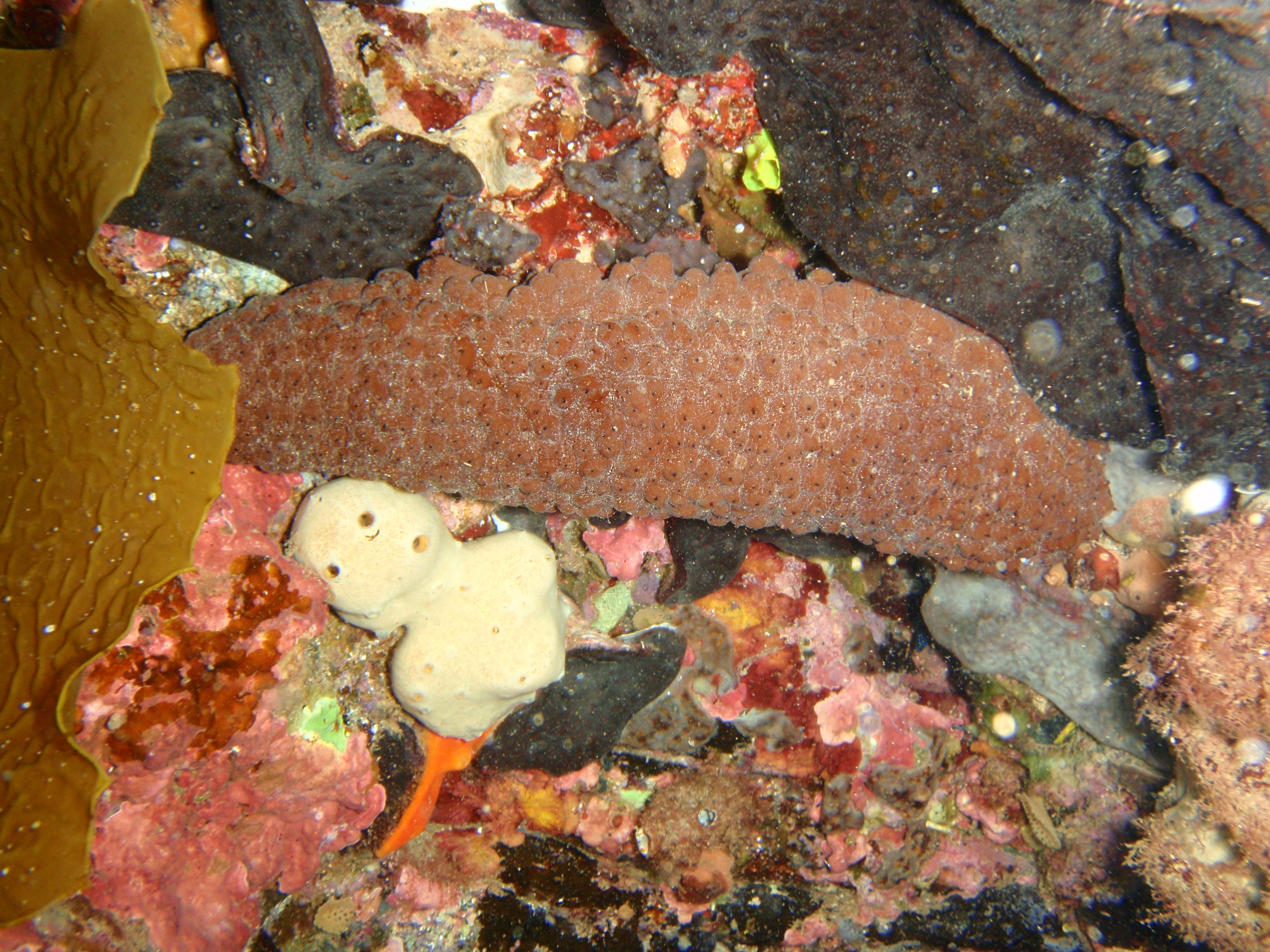
Australostichopus mollis

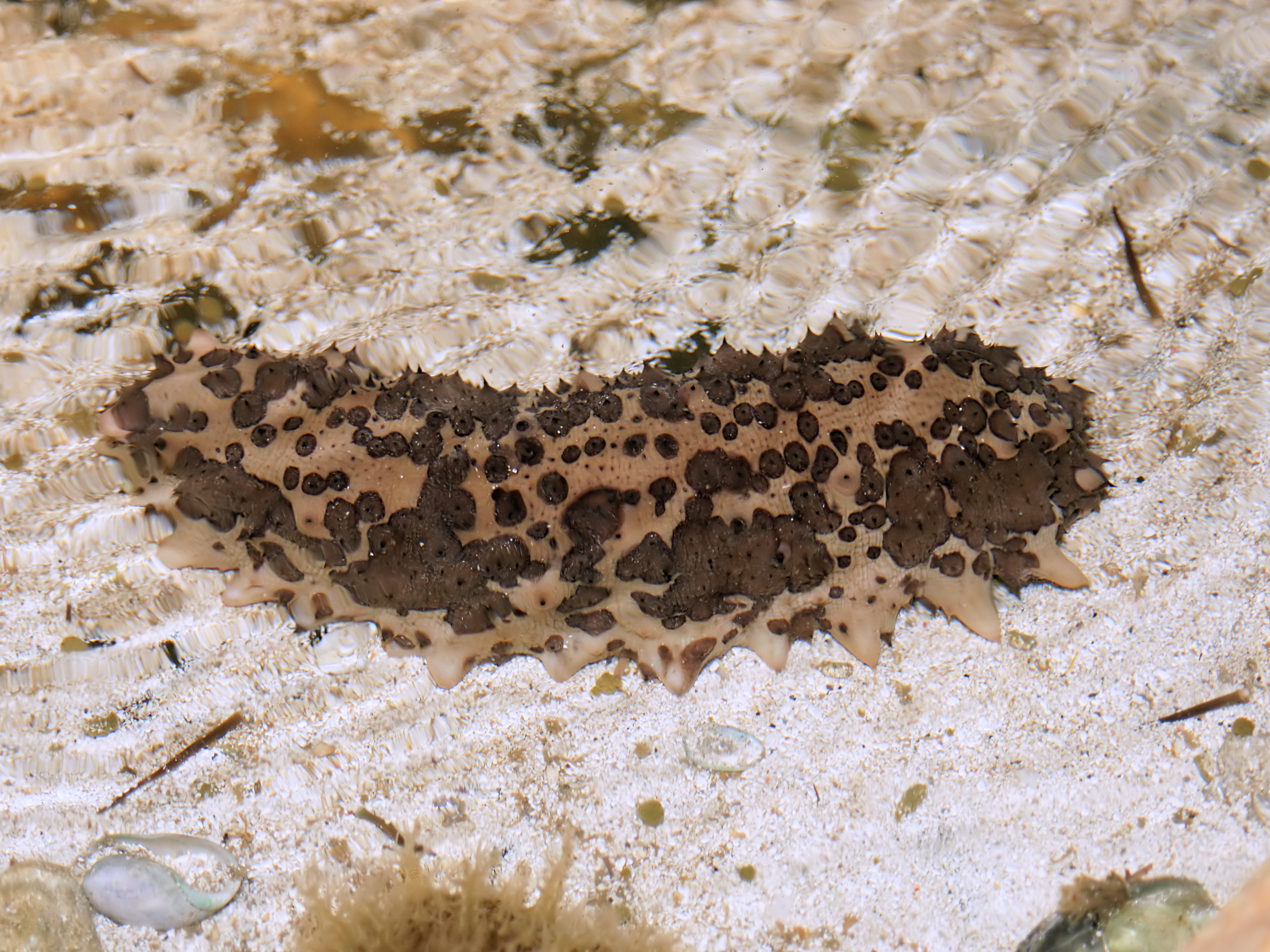
Isostichopus badionotus

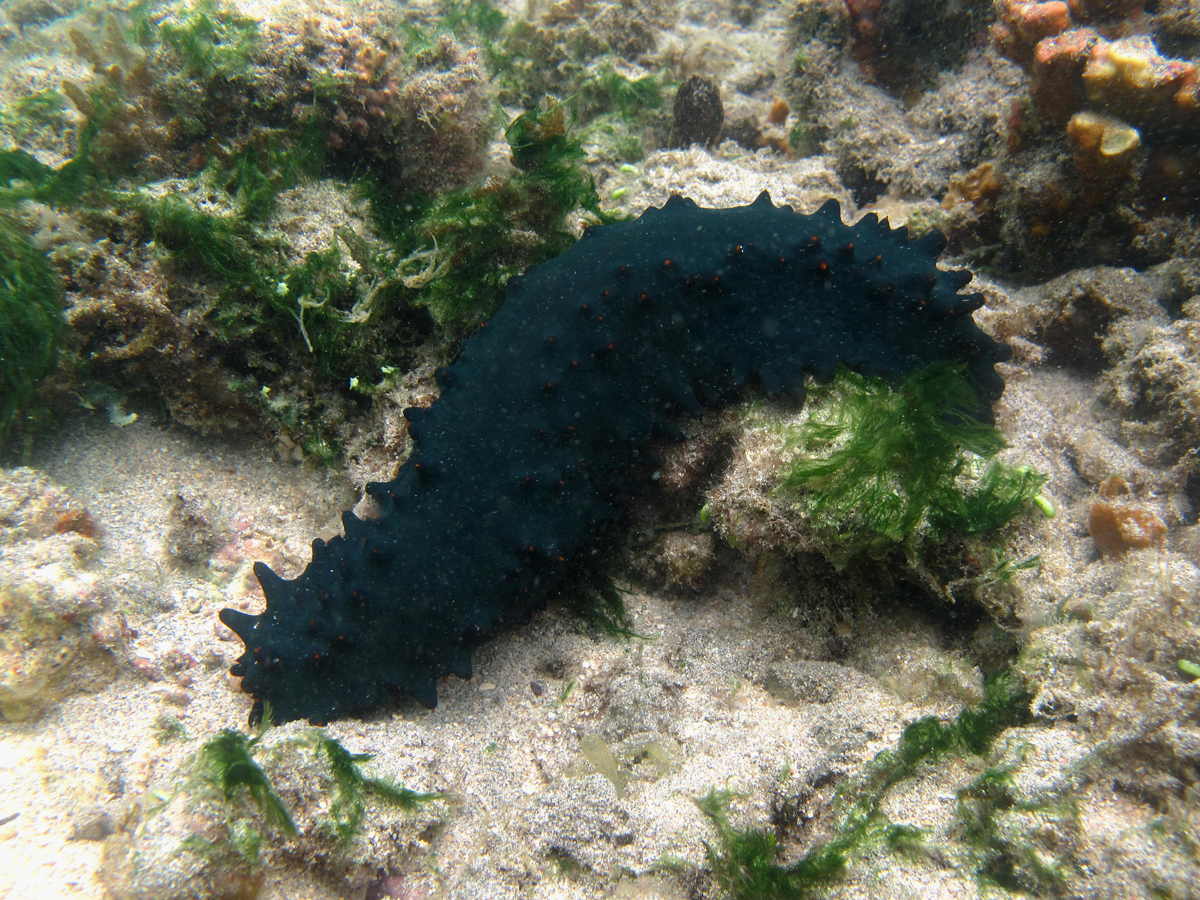
Stichopus chloronotus

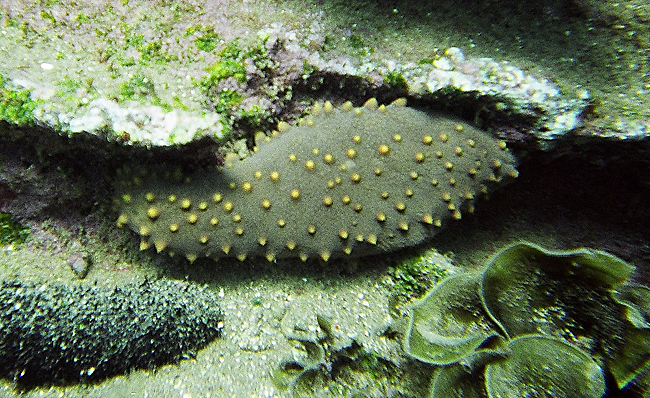
Isostichopus fuscus

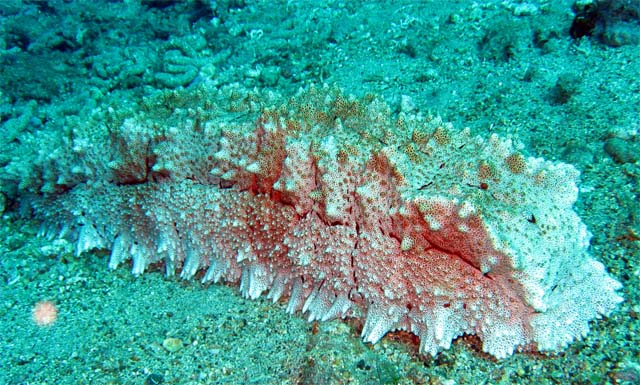
Thelenota anax
