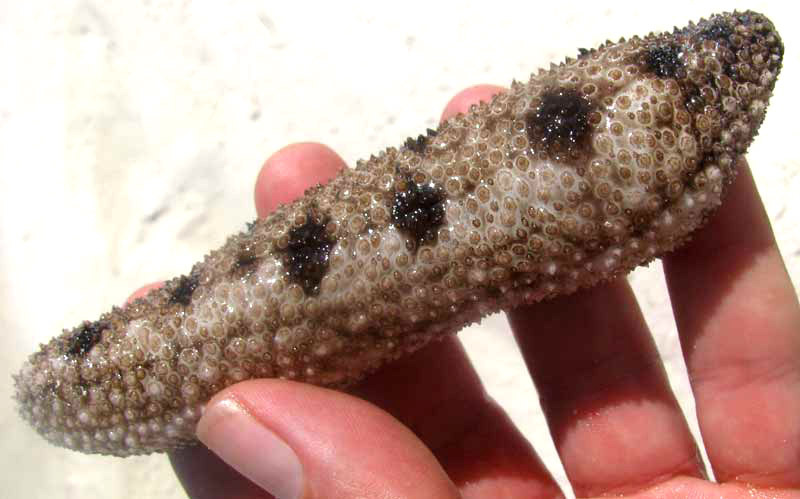

Conservation status
- Least Concern (IUCN 3.1)

Scientific classification
- Kingdom: Animalia
- Phylum: Echinodermata
- Class: Holothuroidea
- Order: Holothuriida
- Family: Holothuriidae
- Genus: Holothuria
- Species: H. princeps

Binomial name
- Holothuria princeps Selenka, 1867

= Noble sea cucumber =

Species of echinoderm

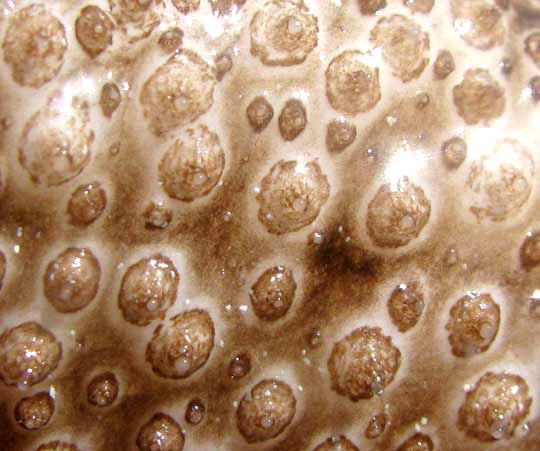
Holothuria princeps, close-up of papillae

Holothuria princeps, commonly known as the noble sea cucumber, is a species of echinoderm belonging to the family Holothuriidae.

== Description ==
Typical of the 1100 or so sea cucumber species -- members of the class Holothuroidea -- Holothuria princeps displays no conspicuous features promptly identifiable as feet, eyes, mouth, anus, sexual organs or appendages. However, the species can be recognized by the following general features:

- Bodies are the shape and size of cucumbers and reach up to about 30cm in length (1 foot).
- They are covered with leathery, densely warty skin, the warty projections mostly being papillae.
- They are adorned with a certain consistency of brownness of variable hues, intensities and patterns.

Technical details distinguishing Holothuria princeps from other species include:

- The body wall is relatively thick and rigid because of the number of embedded, grain-like, calcareous elements called ossicles.
- The papillae on the upper side are of various sizes, and scattered among them are similarly appearing "tube feet" used for moving about and adhering to the substrate.
- The body's lower surface is covered with tube feet arranged in about 3 series of six rows, more numerous in the middle part.
- The mouth, a small, simple hole, on the lower side near the front end, is surrounded by 20 short, white, flat-topped tentacles only slightly larger than nearby papillae.
- Often sea cucumbers discharge Cuvierian tubules through the anus, functioning as a form of defense, but these haven't been observed in Holothuria princeps.

== Distribution ==
Holothuria princeps occurs on the US coast of North Carolina and the Bahamas southward through the Caribbean, including the coasts of Mexico, Colombia and Venezuela. Also along the Brazilian Atlantic coast.

== Habitat ==
Holothuria princeps burrows into sandy mud and shell substrates, and occurs in seagrass in waters down to 73m in depth (~240 feet). In Brazil they have been reported from a coral reef.

== Ecology ==
Sea cucumber species -- holothurians -- are known to move and recycle up to 90% of the biomass of the ocean's benthic zone, thus playing an important ecological role as large-scale detritus feeders.

== Development ==
The larvae of all sea cucumbers develop in sea water. After metamorphosing, young sea cucumbers settle onto the water body's floor and grow into adults.

== Physiology ==
Sea cucumbers are capable of regenerating certain damaged or removed parts. In a Leptosynapta sea cucumber, a small disk of tissue containing the mouth, a ring of ten calcium carbonate plates surrounding the throat (calcareous ring), and a band of neural tissue surrounding the mouth (nerve ring), has regenerated the whole rest of the animal. Another holothurian has been observed after evisceration to completely regenerate its entire digestive tube, its network of blood vessels and sinuses involved in the circulation of fluids (hemal system) and its system of branched, thin-walled tubes (respiratory trees) functioning as "water lungs" for taking in oxygen and expelling carbon dioxide by pumping water in and out through the anus.

== Taxonomy ==
In 1867, Emil Selenka first formally described Holothuria princeps, based on a collection from Florida in the USA.

Sometimes the name Holothuria princeps is seen listed as a synonym for the species with the same name and published in the same year, 1867. Apparently that is because, also in 1867, Selenka published the same species and name in his dissertation at the University of Göttingen, which today is in Germany.

Occasionally the taxon name is presented as Holothuria (Theelothuria) princeps. That's because in 1958 Elisabeth Deichmann erected a subgenus within the genus Holothuria named Theelothuria, which still is recognized.

== Etymology ==
The genus name Holothuria is a New Latin construct based on the Greek word holothoruion, meaning "water polyp."

The species name princeps is the Latin word princeps meaning "first person, ruler, sovereign," etc., thus the common name Noble Sea Cucumber.
