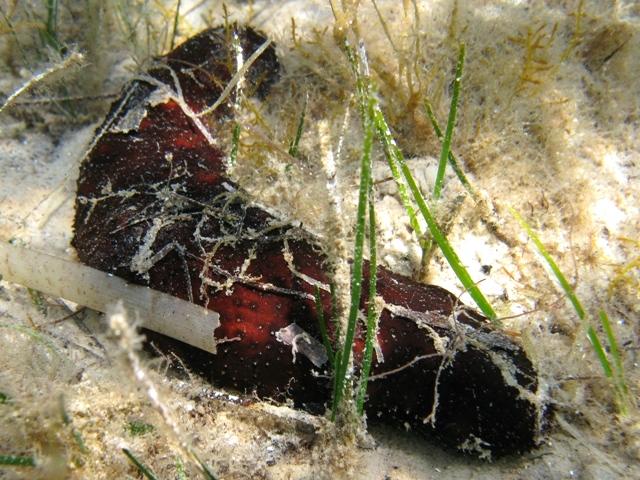

Conservation status
- Least Concern (IUCN 3.1)

Scientific classification
- Kingdom: Animalia
- Phylum: Echinodermata
- Class: Holothuroidea
- Order: Holothuriida
- Family: Holothuriidae
- Genus: Holothuria
- Species: H. poli

Binomial name
- Holothuria poli Delle Chiaje, 1824

= Holothuria poli =

Species of sea cucumber

Holothuria (Roweothuria) poli, also known as the white spot cucumber, is a species of sea cucumber in the family Holothuridae and the subgenus Roweothuria. The species was first described by the Italian doctor and naturalist Stefano delle Chiaje in 1824. The species' range has been documented as being in the Mediterranean Sea, Red Sea, and the Bay of Biscay.

== Description ==
Holothuria poli is cylindrical and grows to a length of about 25 cm (10 in) and a width of 5 cm (2 in). At the anterior end is a crown of retractable tentacles surrounding the mouth; at the posterior end is the cloacal opening. The thick leathery skin contains embedded calcareous sclerites and has blackish spots on a mottled background of brown and grey. The ventral surface is somewhat paler than the dorsal surface, which has numerous low tubercles tipped with white. The longitudinal rows of tube feet exude mucus to which sand and detritus adhere, often concealing the animal's appearance. This species is often confused with Holothuria tubulosa, which has a similar distribution.

== Distribution and habitat ==
Holothuria poli is found in the East Atlantic Ocean, between the Canary Islands and the Bay of Biscay, in the Mediterranean Sea and in the Red Sea; its occurrence in the Red Sea is likely as a result of its larvae passing through the Suez Canal, a process known as anti-Lessepsian migration. It inhabits the seabed, usually at depths down to about 20 m (70 ft), but has been observed on a muddy substrate off the coast of Tunisia at much greater depths (80 to 250 m (260 to 820 ft)). It is found on sand or rock, and favours seagrass meadows and areas with green seaweed such as Caulerpa.

== Ecology ==
Holothuria poli is a limnivore, using the tentacles round its mouth to gather up sediment and shovelling this detritus into its mouth. The material is sorted in the gut, with organic particles being digested while sand and other indigestible material is mixed with mucus and formed into balls which are voided in a string of balls through the anus. In this way, it has been calculated that the sea cucumbers in a square metre of sand can "process" nearly 20 kg (44 lb) of sediment in a year. This sea cucumber is sometimes parasitised by the worm-like sea snail Entoconcha mirabilis. It has few predators because of the thick leathery skin and the presence of the bony sclerites in the integument.

The sexes are separate in this species and reproduction takes place between November and January. The animals rear up, adopting L-shaped postures, to release clouds of gametes into the water column; there seems to be some sort of synchronisation mechanism for this release. The larvae are planktonic and pass through several stages before settling on the seabed and undergoing metamorphosis into juveniles.
