= Holothuria lessoni =

Conservation status
- Critically Endangered (IUCN 3.1)

Scientific classification
- Kingdom: Animalia
- Phylum: Echinodermata
- Class: Holothuroidea
- Order: Holothuriida
- Family: Holothuriidae
- Genus: Holothuria
- Species: H. lessoni

Binomial name
- Holothuria lessoni Massin, Uthicke, Purcell, Rowe & Samyn, 2009

Species of sea cucumber

Holothuria lessoni, the golden sandfish, is a species of sea cucumber in the genus Holothuria, subgenus Metriatyla. This sea cucumber inhabits the shallow waters of the Indo-Pacific Ocean, where it is found near islands and reef flats. It is highly sought after in commercial and subsistence fishing and the species threatened by overfishing.
