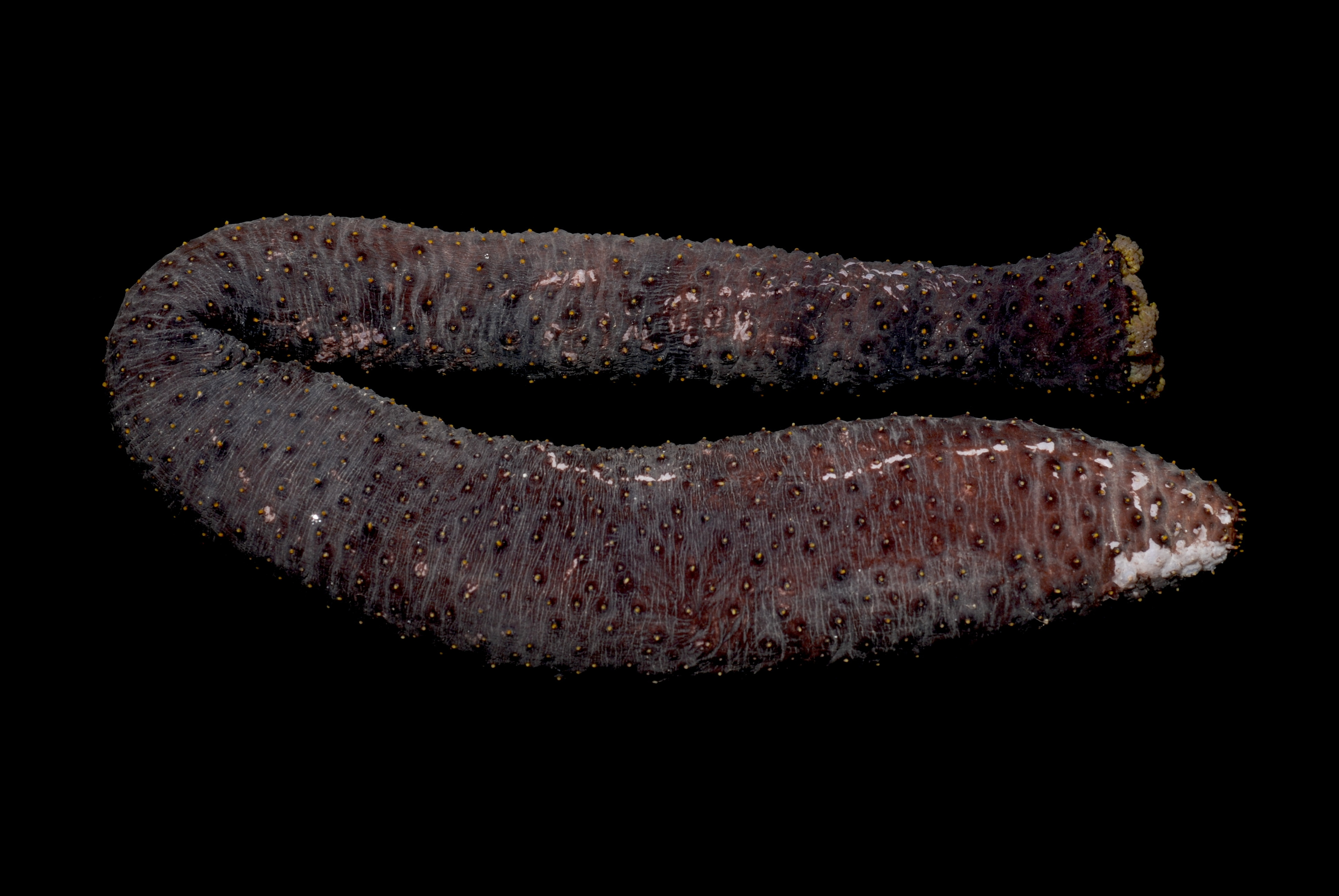

Conservation status
- Least Concern (IUCN 3.1)

Scientific classification
- Kingdom: Animalia
- Phylum: Echinodermata
- Class: Holothuroidea
- Order: Holothuriida
- Family: Holothuriidae
- Genus: Holothuria
- Species: H. flavomaculata

Binomial name
- Holothuria flavomaculata Semper, 1868

= Holothuria flavomaculata =

Species of sea cucumber

Holothuria flavomaculata, also known as the red snakefish, is a species of sea cucumber in the family Holothuriidae found in the Indo-Pacific.

== Description ==
The entire body of Holothuria flavomaculata is dark grey, bluish-black, brownish-red to black, with notable pinkish, orangy, or reddish tips to the many big papillae and yellowish tentacles—an elongated sea cucumber, rather huge. They have an average length of 35 cm, but can reach 60 cm.

== Distribution ==
Holothuria flavomaculata can be found in the Western and Central Pacific and the Indian Ocean, including the Hawaiian Islands, the Federated States of Micronesia, New Caledonia, Madagascar, the Mascarene Islands, the Red Sea, Sri Lanka, Indonesia, China, the Philippines, Australia, Clipperton Island, and French Polynesia.

== Habitat ==
Holothuria flavomaculata usually live in places covered in muck, sand, or coral debris and exist in water depths of 1 to 40 meters.

== Exploitation ==
This species is harvested commercially in Palau, the Federated States of Micronesia, the Solomon Islands, and Vanuatu in the western central Pacific.
