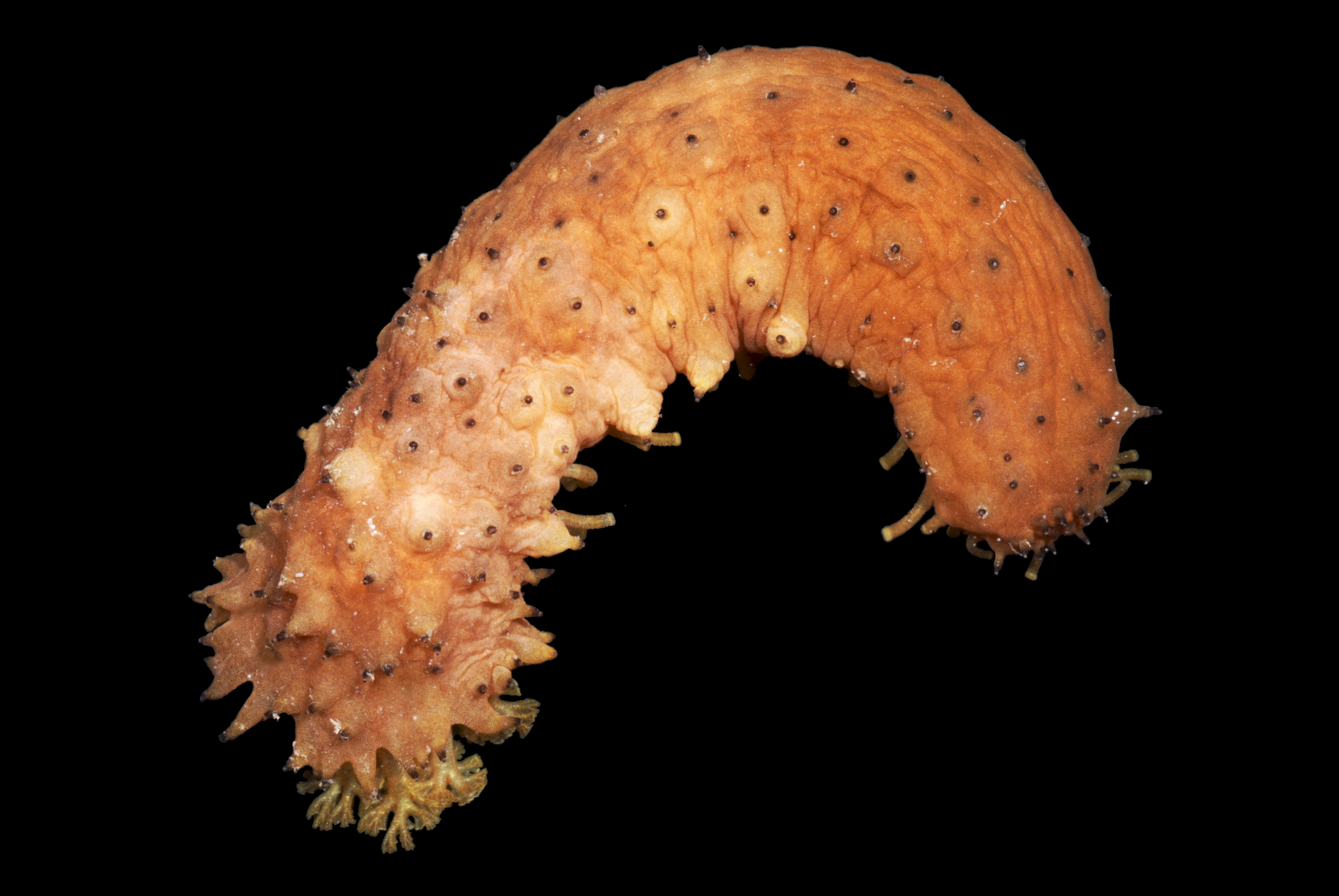

Conservation status
- Least Concern (IUCN 3.1)

Scientific classification
- Kingdom: Animalia
- Phylum: Echinodermata
- Class: Holothuroidea
- Order: Holothuriida
- Family: Holothuriidae
- Genus: Holothuria
- Species: H. difficilis

Binomial name
- Holothuria difficilis Semper, 1868

= Holothuria difficilis =

Species of sea cucumber

Holothuria (Platyperona) difficilis is a species of sea cucumber in the family Holothuriidae. Holothuria comes from Latin but is originally taken from Greek. Its meaning is a plantlike animal whose origin is uncertain, while the German zoologist Hubert Ludwig proposed that it may mean "sea penis," since the root θούριος (thoúrios) has the connotation "sexually arousing."

== Description ==
H. difficilis is a member of the phylum Echinodermata meaning they share a general body plan with other members of the phylum. These traits include pentamerous radial symmetry, an endoskeleton, an oral side opposite of an aboral side, a water vascular system, and tube feet. The oral side contains the mouth for feeding and the aboral side contains an anus used to rid of waste and for respiration. Tube feet is used for locomotion. H. difficilis also contains several mechanisms for defense. Structurally, their dermis is noxious and they also contain very thin Cuvierian tubules that can be ejected. It has been hypothesized these defense mechanisms, that animals such as Holothurians have, are due to evolution against predation. This species contains one gonad and can perform sexual reproduction.

== Distribution and habitat ==
The species has been found in many seas and oceans across the globe such as the Red Sea, and near Central America. However, its general distribution is in the Indian and Pacific Oceans. Typically, this species is benthic and lives inshore. When observed in La Reunion Island fringing reefs, the species resided in outer reef flats and under large boulders.

== Biology ==
The genus, Holothurians, can be categorized as particulate feeders wherein there are two subgroups: suspension feeders and deposit feeders. When observed in Western Australia, it was found that H. difficilis that resided there were deposit feeders, where the species grazed on rocks and ate sediment. The mechanism by which H. difficilis feeds is unknown but other Holothurian deposit feeders have different shaped tentacles that catch food.

Although the life cycle of H. difficilis is not specifically known, sea cucumbers can start off as fertilized eggs that either develop inside an adult sea cucumber or float freely through the water. During spawning, Holothurians tend to wave the front of their body. The hypothesized reason is to ensure that gametes do not get stuck in the sediment. As an adult, this species mainly reproduces asexually but can also reproduce sexually. The means of reproducing asexually is done by fission of the body otherwise known as fragmentation. Depending on the fission site, the organism's internal organs may be affected. However, this species is able to regenerate and can rebuild their body. H. difficilis, along with other species in the Holothuria genus living in the southern hemisphere have specific reproductive schedules. Asexual reproduction was at its highest in the winter season which correlated with lower water temperatures whereas sexual reproduction was at its highest in the late spring to summer seasons which correlated with warmer water temperatures.

== Predators ==
The main predator of H. difficilis are sea stars. However, they are also preyed upon by fish. Sea stars are able to wholly ingest sea cucumbers whereas fish typically can only eat certain because of H. difficilis' dermal toxicity.
