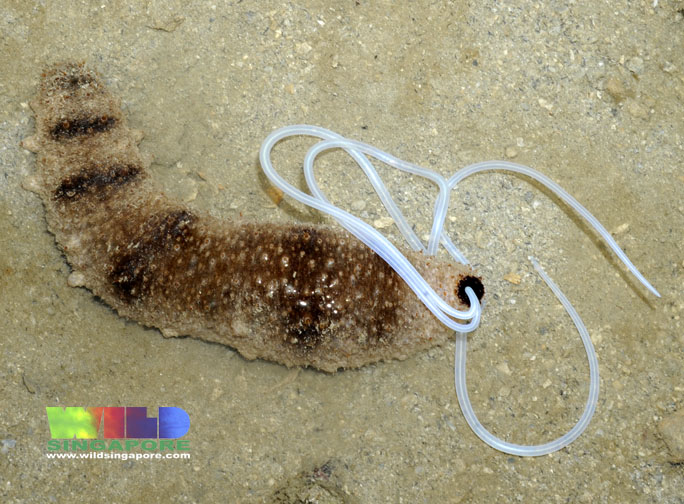

Conservation status
- Least Concern (IUCN 3.1)

Scientific classification
- Kingdom: Animalia
- Phylum: Echinodermata
- Class: Holothuroidea
- Order: Holothuriida
- Family: Holothuriidae
- Genus: Holothuria
- Species: H. fuscocinerea

Binomial name
- Holothuria fuscocinerea Jaeger, 1833

= Holothuria fuscocinerea =

Species of sea cucumber

Holothuria fuscocinerea, the ashy pink sea cucumber, is a species of sea cucumber in the family Holothuriidae. It is placed in the subgenus Stauropora, making its full name Holothuria (Stauropora) fuscocinerea. It is native to shallow water in the tropical and sub-tropical Indo-Pacific.

== Description ==
This sea cucumber has an oval, cylindrical body, flattened somewhat on the underside, and rounded at both ends. It can reach a length of 70 centimetres (28 in) but 50 centimetres (20 in) is a more normal size. The adult weighs between 3 and 5.5 kilograms (7 and 12 lb). The mouth is on the underside at the front and is surrounded by twenty short, brown, branched feeding tentacles. The anus is dark brown or black and has no anal teeth, but is surrounded by five white-tipped papillae. There are Cuvierian tubules in this species. The skin is soft, thick and wrinkled, often with sand adhering to it. It varies in colour, the upperside usually being greyish or brownish, while the underside is a dirty white. There is often a series of dark bars in the transverse wrinkles.

== Distribution ==
H. fuscocinerea has a widespread distribution in the Indian and Pacific Oceans. Its range extends from East Africa and the Red Sea to southern Japan, northern Australia and Central America. It is typically found on coral rubble and soft sediments, and among seagrasses. It usually occurs at depths of less than 10 m (33 ft) but can occur down to 40 m (130 ft).

== Ecology ==
H. fuscocinerea is a detritivore and feeds at night, sifting through the sediment with its feeding tentacles, swallowing the sediment and extracting the bacteria and organic material it contains, while the sand passes on through its gut.

Breeding takes place in the hot season. The sexes are separate in this species; they climb to an elevated location before releasing their gametes into the water column. Females produce an average of around three million eggs. The larvae are pelagic and drift with the plankton. When sufficiently developed they settle on the seabed and undergo metamorphosis into juveniles.

Like other sea cucumbers, the tissues contain saponins which are distasteful and toxic to fish, causing haemolysis of the red blood cells, which can be fatal. The skin periodically flakes off in little shreds, and fish can sometimes be seen nibbling these. This desquamation may be a method for the sea cucumber to rid itself of metabolic waste.

== Status ==
This is a common species of sea cucumber. It is of little commercial importance to fisheries, but is sometimes used for food, especially in China, the Philippines and Malaysia. It may be used more for this purpose if other more palatable species become depleted. The International Union for Conservation of Nature has assessed its conservation status as being of "least concern".
