= Holothuria grisea =

Conservation status
- Least Concern (IUCN 3.1)

Scientific classification
- Kingdom: Animalia
- Phylum: Echinodermata
- Class: Holothuroidea
- Order: Holothuriida
- Family: Holothuriidae
- Genus: Holothuria
- Species: H. grisea

Binomial name
- Holothuria grisea Selenka, 1867

Species of sea cucumber

Holothuria grisea, the gray sea cucumber, is a mid-sized coastal species of sea cucumber found in shallow tropical waters of the Atlantic Ocean from Florida to Southern Brazil and West Africa. They have a variety in color and can range from red to more yellowish with brown markings. They are also a food source for local and international markets with the majority of harvesting taking place in Brazil. This species is currently not over-fished and is not endangered or threatened.

== Taxonomy ==
Holothuria grisea was first described by Emil Selenka in 1867. Holothuria is derived from Latin and means water polyp. It is in the phylum Echinodermata (meaning spiny skin in Greek) which also includes sea stars and urchins. It belongs to the class Holothuroidea which contains the sea cucumbers. It is classified under the sub-genus Halodeima and is synonymous with Halodeima grisea and Ludwigothuria grisea.

== Anatomy and morphology ==
The gray sea cucumber exhibits pentaradial symmetry like all members of Echinodermata. They are mostly cylindrical with a flattened ventral side. They can grow up to 30 cm in length but sizes around 14 cm are more common and considered the average size. Their coloration is variable and they are generally not gray like their common name would make one think. They have base colors ranging from red to orange to yellow and have brown mottling. This coloration acts as camouflage in the reefs they inhabit. The dorsal papillae are generally white which transitions to yellow towards the tips. The tentacles and the tube feet on the ventral side are also yellow. Tube feet are what echinoderms use for movement and work by using hydraulic pressure. There are differences between juveniles and adults. Adults will have six rows of papillae on the dorsal surface where juveniles have only 4. Each papilla has 5–10 tube feet and the mouth is surrounded with 20–25 branched tentacles. The mouth is facing towards the bottom as they are bottom feeders. They are also covered in ossicles which are calcified structures that from a sort of skeleton that gives echinoderms structure and some rigidity. There are also internal plates that serve the same function. H. grisea is an osmoconformer which means its internal salt content (osmotic pressure) is the same as the surrounding salt content.

== Life history and reproduction ==
Echinoderms in general are gonochoristic which means there are two distinct sexes and this is true for the gray sea cucumber. Fertilization is done externally through broadcast spawning. This means that eggs and sperm are released into the water column where they must find each other. Spawning is not done at random and is seasonal. It can be triggered by changes in light availability, temperature, salinity, moon phase, food availability and other factors. The spawning events represent a cyclical cycle. The sea cucumbers will aggregate in the months of June and July during the rainy season when there is high phytoplankton growth. Aggregation increases the success rate in broadcast spawning since the gametes are released in the same area. The spawning is timed with phytoplankton growth to allow the larva an abundant food source. They will also wait for high tides and low light conditions. Gray sea cucumbers are classified as meroplanktonic larva called auricularia once they hatch from the egg. The auricularia are non feeding and sustain themselves with a yolk sac. The next stage is doliolaria which is characterized by 5 ciliary bands. This stage is still planktonic. The next stage are juveniles which are characterized by 4 rows of papillae. They will then turn into an adult with 6 rows of papillae. Their average lifespan is 5–10 years and they reach sexual maturity at around 2 years.

== Habitat and distribution ==
Holotuhria grisea is a coastal tropical species found in the Atlantic Ocean. It generally prefers shallower waters and can be found in sand flats, seagrass beds, and reefs. Geographically, it can be found in Florida, the Caribbean islands, Central America, Brazil, and West Africa. Since they are osmoconformers, salinity has a major impact in their distribution.

== Ecology and diet ==
They are deposit feeders which means they sift through the sediment and sort out any organic material. This includes organic waste, algae, small aquatic invertebrates and other detritus that sinks to the bottom. They perform an important role in the ecosystem by recycling organic matter and putting it back into the food wed. Sea cucumber eggs and larvae provide an important food source for many other species. Juvenile fish and other small organisms will feed on them. The adults will also serve as prey to larger predators such as starfish, crabs, fish, and sea turtles which allows for energy from detritus to be transferred up the food web to higher trophic levels. Adult and juvenile sea cucumbers will often bury into the sand and will act as bioremediators while sifting through sediment while feeding. This results in high levels of bioturbation which is important to the ecosystem. They release inorganic phosphorus and nitrogen which provides essential nutrients to benthic organisms. H. grisea also serves as a host for many parasites and symbiotic species which increases ecosystem biodiversity. Their feeding behavior and excretions will aid in buffering the environment from ocean acidification.

== Impact to economy ==
The gray sea cucumber is heavily fished in Northern Brazil. It serves as a growing food source there but the majority is exported to Asia for the food market there. Although there has not been any proof that they are being overfished, studies have shown that 66% of harvested individuals were immature signifying they had not had a chance to reproduce before harvest. The fishery is currently unregulated and there is no form of reporting or documenting harvests. This could potentially become an issue in the future if they are overexploited due to their important role in the ecosystem. The results could be a decrease in sediment quality, water quality, and biodiversity.

== Conservation status ==
Holothuria grisea is currently listed as a species of least concern by the IUCN Red list. Due to the unregulated fishery in South America along with the lack of data from it, it is possible that the population could be heavily impacted, especially with a majority of the harvest being immature individuals.
