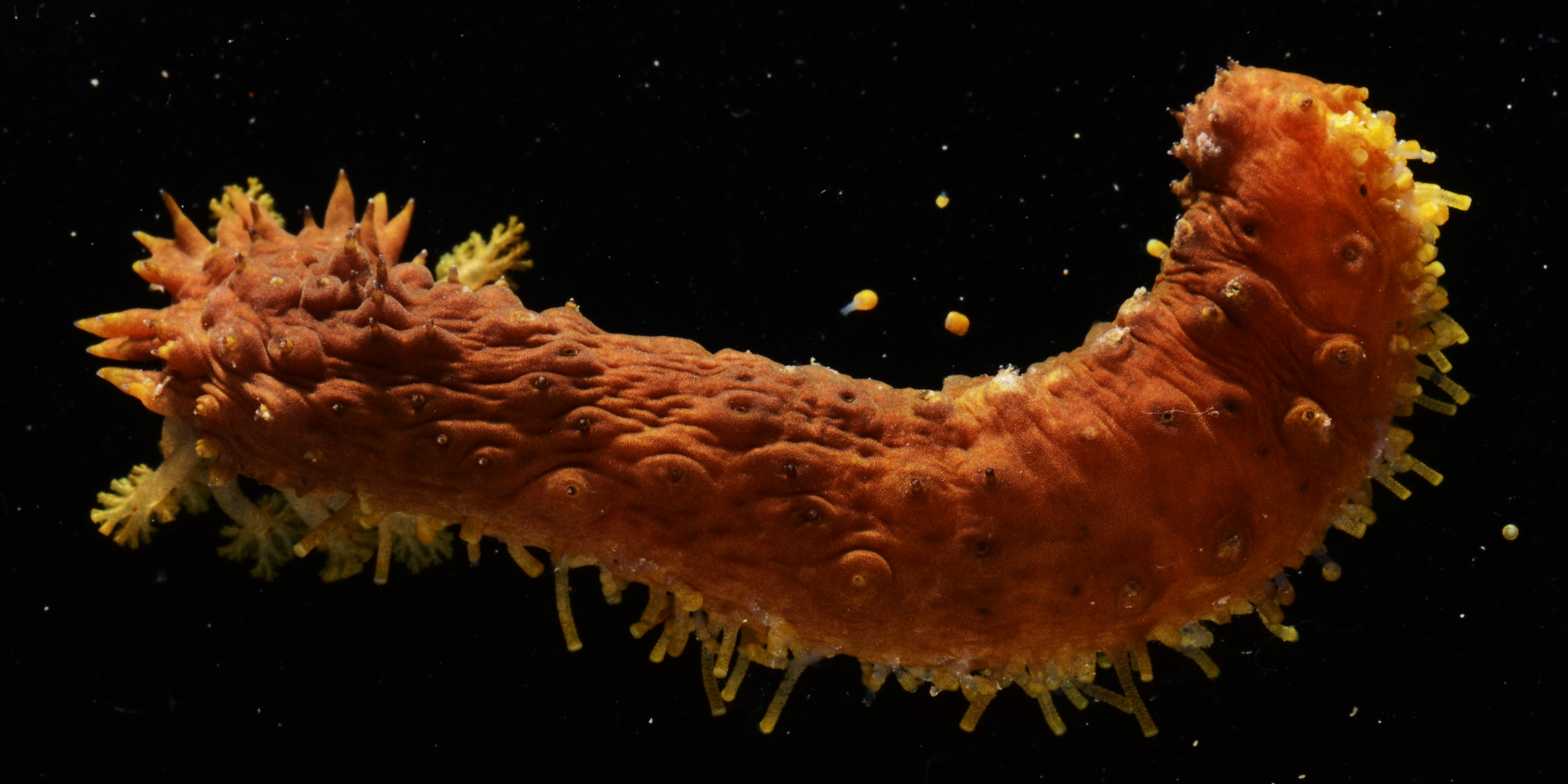

Conservation status
- Least Concern (IUCN 3.1)

- Apparently Secure (NatureServe)

Scientific classification
- Kingdom: Animalia
- Phylum: Echinodermata
- Class: Holothuroidea
- Order: Holothuriida
- Family: Holothuriidae
- Genus: Holothuria
- Species: H. parvula

Binomial name
- Holothuria parvula (Selenka, 1867)

Synonyms
- H. abbreviata Heilprin, 1888; H. captiva Ludwig, 1875; Muelleria parvula Selenka, 1867

= Holothuria parvula =

Species of sea cucumber

Holothuria parvula, the golden sea cucumber, is a species of echinoderm in the class Holothuroidea. It was first described by Emil Selenka in 1867 and has since been placed in the subgenus Platyperona, making its full scientific name Holothuria (Platyperona) parvula. It is found in shallow areas of the Caribbean Sea and Gulf of Mexico and is unusual among sea cucumbers in that it can reproduce by breaking in half.

== Description ==
Holothuria parvula is a roughly cylindrical sea cucumber with tube feet on the underside and conical warty protuberances on the upper surface. It is a golden colour.

== Distribution ==
Holothuria parvula is found on the seabed in shallow water in the tropical western part of the Atlantic, the Caribbean Sea and Gulf of Mexico. Its range includes Bermuda, the West Indies, the Bahamas, the Lesser Antilles, Colombia and Venezuela.

== Biology ==
Holothuria parvula lives on a sandy seabed and feeds on detritus, algae and plankton. It crawls across the surface or manoeuvres across rocks with its tube feet. If attacked or stressed, this sea cucumber may eject a mass of sticky threads called cuvierian tubules from its anus. These contain a toxin called holothurin and entangle small fish or crabs which are unable to free themselves and eventually die. Meanwhile, the sea cucumber continues on its way and regenerates the tubules in the course of time.

Holothuria parvula is able to reproduce asexually by transverse fission. In Bermuda, it does this during the summer when the water temperature rises to at least 25 °C (77 °F). A split occurs in the body wall that gradually deepens and extends across the body which eventually breaks apart. The two parts so formed are about equal in size and each can regenerate the lost organs. The gut is the most important organ for survival and both front and rear portions are able to feed again within two months. The gonads take longer to regenerate. In the Bermudan population studied, no juvenile specimens of Holothuria parvula were found during the course of the study, and the researchers thought it likely that little or no recruitment involving planktonic larvae takes place and that fission is an annual event and the main means of reproduction.
