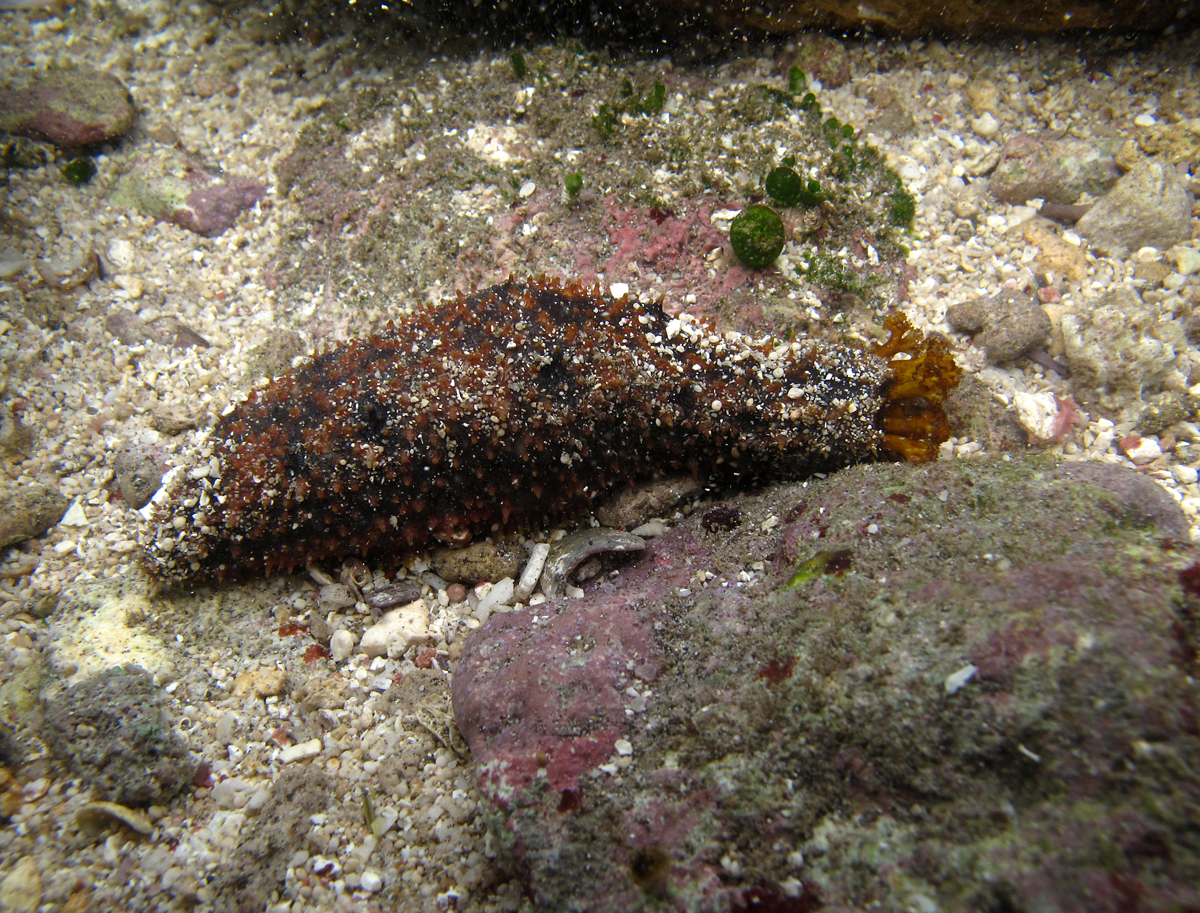

Conservation status
- Least Concern (IUCN 3.1)

Scientific classification
- Kingdom: Animalia
- Phylum: Echinodermata
- Class: Holothuroidea
- Order: Holothuriida
- Family: Holothuriidae
- Genus: Holothuria
- Species: H. cinerascens

Binomial name
- Holothuria cinerascens Brandt, 1835

= Holothuria cinerascens =

Species of sea cucumber

Holothuria (Semperothuria) cinerascens is a species of sea cucumber in the family Holothuriidae. The sea cucumber is widely distributed in the Pacific and Indian ocean, being found from the Red Sea to Madagascar and from Japan to Australia. It was first described by Brandt in 1835.

== Description and biology ==
The ashy sea cucumber appears as a black tube with grey or red specs giving it the overall appearance like ashes and varies in size from ten to thirty centimeters. They live for about five to fifteen years. The ashy sea cucumber uses its tentacles to catch floating particles from the water column, such as plankton, algae, tiny aquatic organisms and organic detritus. Holothuria cinerascens is gonochoric and a broadcast spawner.

== Habitat ==
This species can be found around coral reefs and rocks, in tide pools, in deeper waters, lagoons, and bays, often hiding in very tight spaces. Their movement and migration patterns depend on their depth of sea level they are located at, influence of light intensity, the temperature conditions and the amount of predators surrounding the area.

== Human use ==
These marine animals are very nutritional. They contain minerals, calcium, vitamins, irons, zinc and magnesium. They are very important human food sources which is why they have high economic food value. These sea cucumbers are also part of pharmaceutical uses. Their protein is rich in glycine (major component) and also contain amino acids and other components (glutamic acid, alanine, threonine acid, etc.).

== Hawaiʻi ==
Ashy sea cucumbers are very common on Hawaiian shorelines. They are known as "Loli pua" in Hawaiian. As for cultural connections (Moʻolelo), these sea cucumbers were eaten and used as medicine during traditional Hawaiian life.
