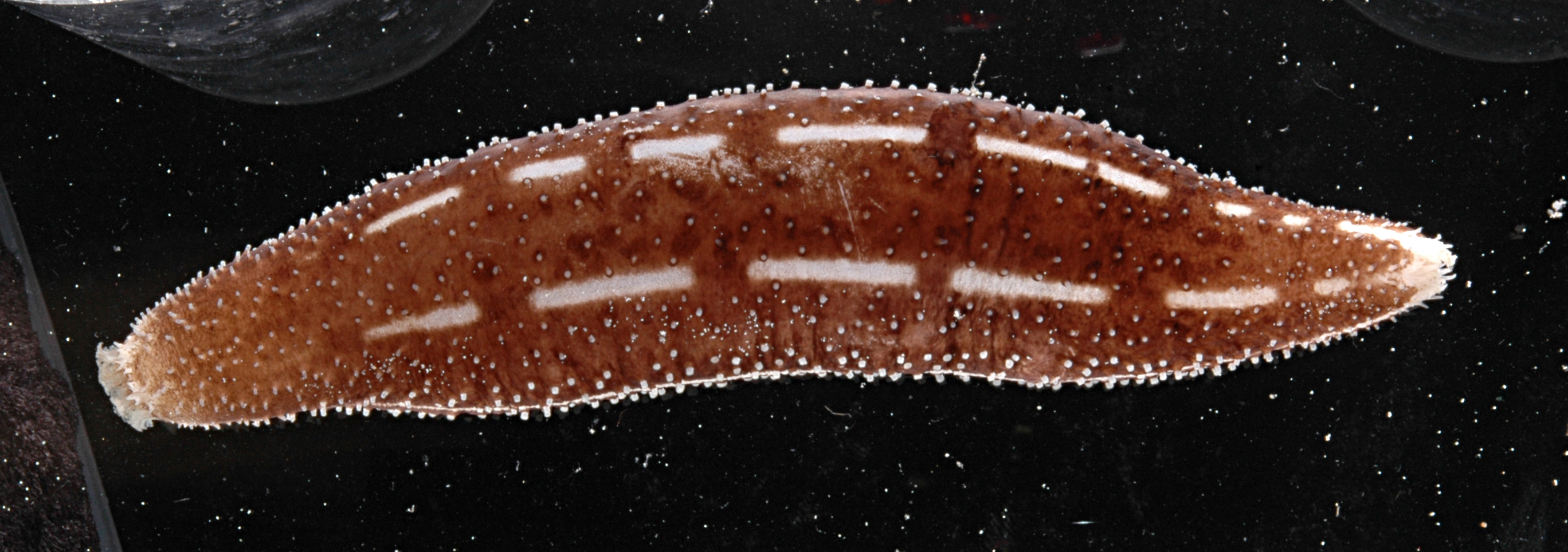

Conservation status
- Data Deficient (IUCN 3.1)

Scientific classification
- Kingdom: Animalia
- Phylum: Echinodermata
- Class: Holothuroidea
- Order: Holothuriida
- Family: Holothuriidae
- Genus: Holothuria
- Species: H. michaelseni

Binomial name
- Holothuria michaelseni Erwe, 1913

= Holothuria michaelseni =

Species of sea cucumber

Holothuria michaelseni is a species of sea cucumber in the family Holothuridae. The cucumber is found in the eastern Indian Ocean and off the northwestern coast of Australia. The species was first described by Erwe in 1913.
