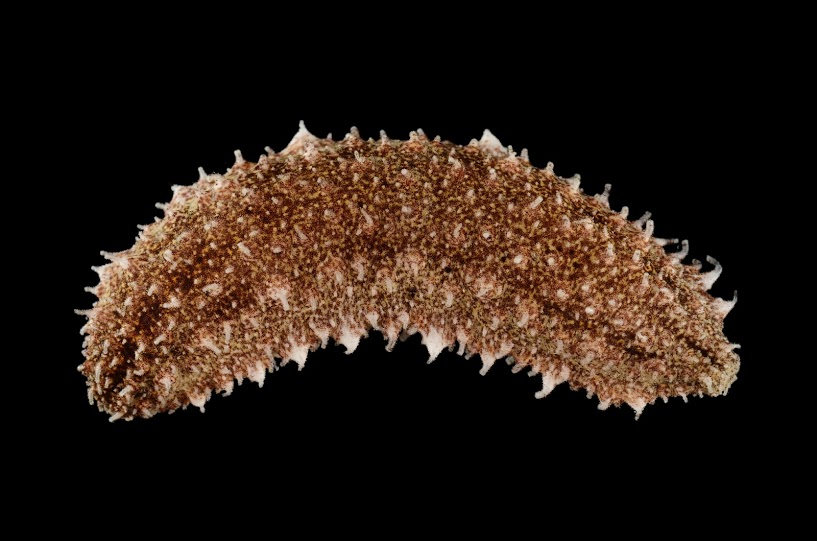

Conservation status
- Data Deficient (IUCN 3.1)

Scientific classification
- Kingdom: Animalia
- Phylum: Echinodermata
- Class: Holothuroidea
- Order: Holothuriida
- Family: Holothuriidae
- Genus: Holothuria
- Species: H. albiventer

Binomial name
- Holothuria albiventer Semper, 1868

= Holothuria albiventer =

Species of sea cucumber

Holothuria (Metriatyla) albiventer is a species of sea cucumber in the genus Holothuria, subspecies Metriatyla. First described by Semper in 1868, the species is distributed in the Western Indian Ocean and the Red Sea. The species is found at a depth of 0-36 meters.
