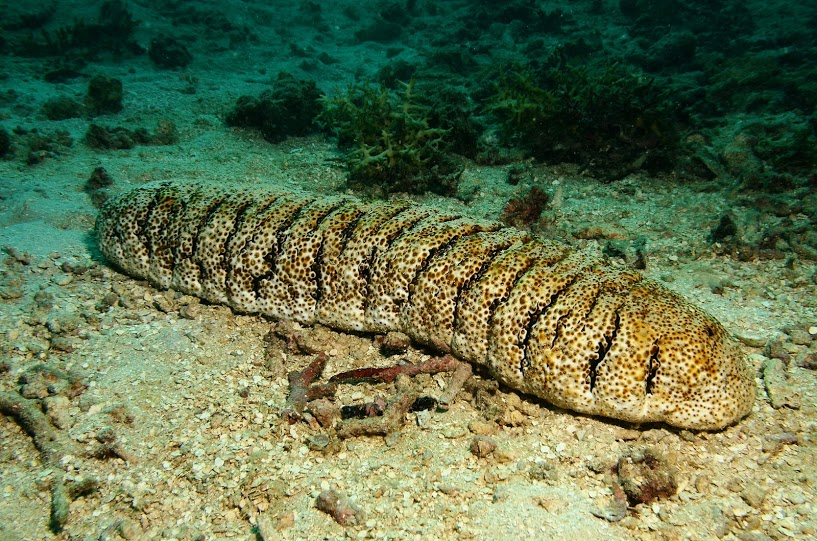

Conservation status
- Least Concern (IUCN 3.1)

Scientific classification
- Kingdom: Animalia
- Phylum: Echinodermata
- Class: Holothuroidea
- Order: Holothuriida
- Family: Holothuriidae
- Genus: Holothuria
- Species: H. fuscopunctata

Binomial name
- Holothuria fuscopunctata Jaeger, 1833

Synonyms
- Holothuria axiologa Clark, 1921

= Holothuria fuscopunctata =

Species of sea cucumber

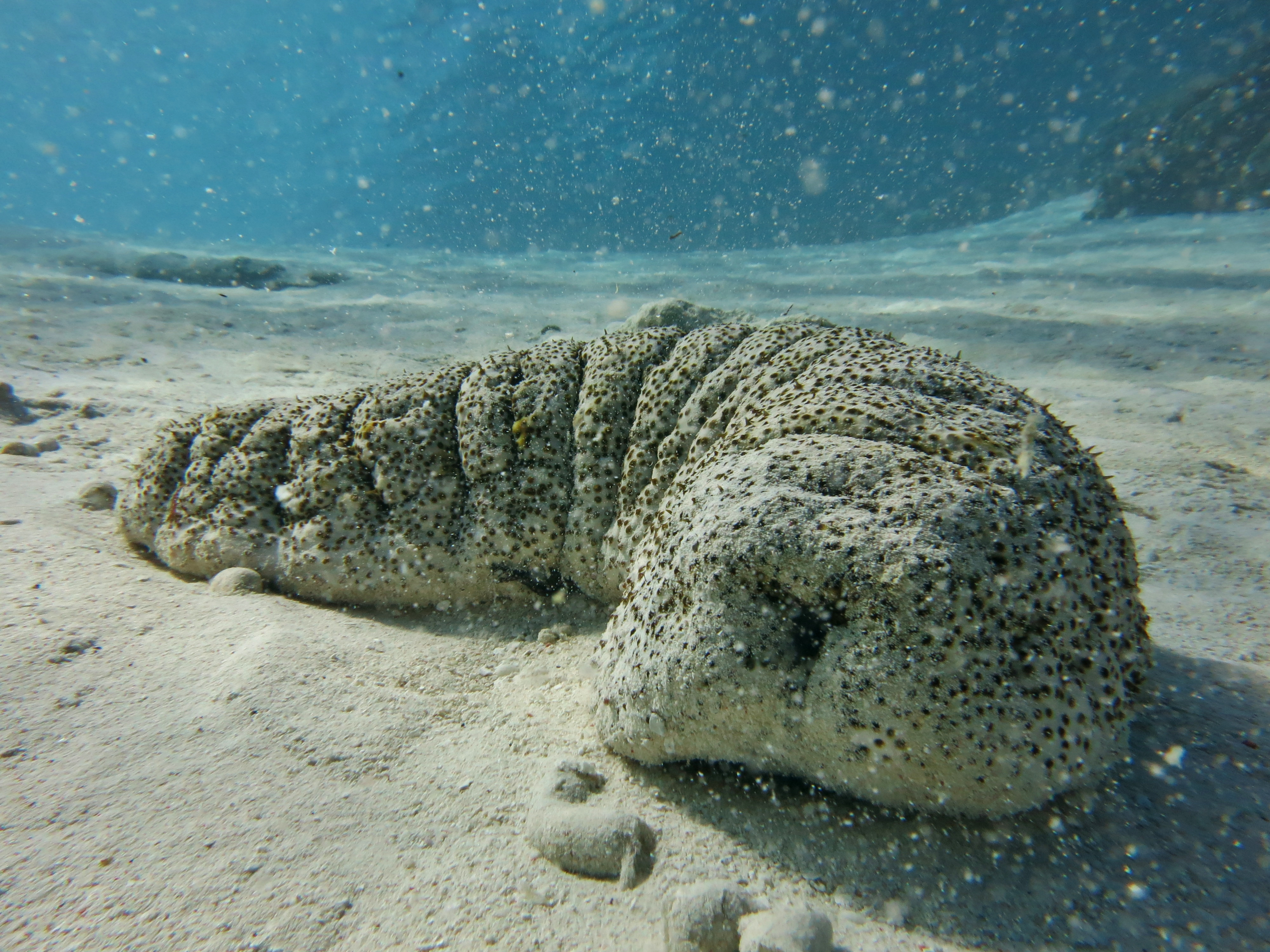
In its natural environment

Holothuria fuscopunctata, the elephant trunkfish, is a species of sea cucumber in the family Holothuriidae native to shallow water in the tropical Indo-Pacific. It is placed in the subgenus Microthele, making its full name Holothuria (Microthele) fuscopunctata.

== Description ==
A large sea cucumber, H. fuscopunctata reaches a maximum length of 70 cm (28 in), although a more usual length is about half this. It can weigh up to 4.5 kg (10 lb). The body wall is thick and golden-brown with darker spots and dark brown wrinkles. The underside is whitish, the mouth being surrounded by twenty thick brown tentacles and the anus surrounded by a black band. The cloaca is large and black, but there are no Cuvierian tubules.

== Distribution and habitat ==
H. fuscopunctata has a wide distribution in the tropical Indo-Pacific. Its range extends from Madagascar and the eastern coast of Africa to Japan, China, Australia and the Mariana Islands, Palau and New Caledonia. Its depth range is down to a maximum of 30 m (100 ft); it is common in some parts of its range, but scarce in the Philippines, Federated States of Micronesia, and Marshall Islands. On the African coast it mostly occurs on sandy seabeds and seagrass meadows, but in the Central Pacific, it mostly occurs on reef slopes and on coral rubble, although it also lives in seagrass beds.

== Biology ==
This species feeds on organic material that it grazes on the seabed. It is slow to mature and has low fecundity. The sexes are separate and breeding takes place in the warm season, between December and January.

== Status ==
Sea cucumbers are eaten in the Central Pacific. H. fuscopunctata is not particularly esteemed, but it is eaten as a poverty food in times of hardship, such as after cyclones. It is mostly harvested by skin-diving, and is likely to face greater exploitation as other more favoured species become scarcer. There are fisheries in Malaysia, the Philippines, Vietnam and Indonesia; in Madagascar; in the Western Pacific, including the Torres Strait, and in Tuvalu. For the time being, the International Union for Conservation of Nature has assessed its conservation status as being of "least concern", but it is vulnerable to over-exploitation because of its low fertility rate.
