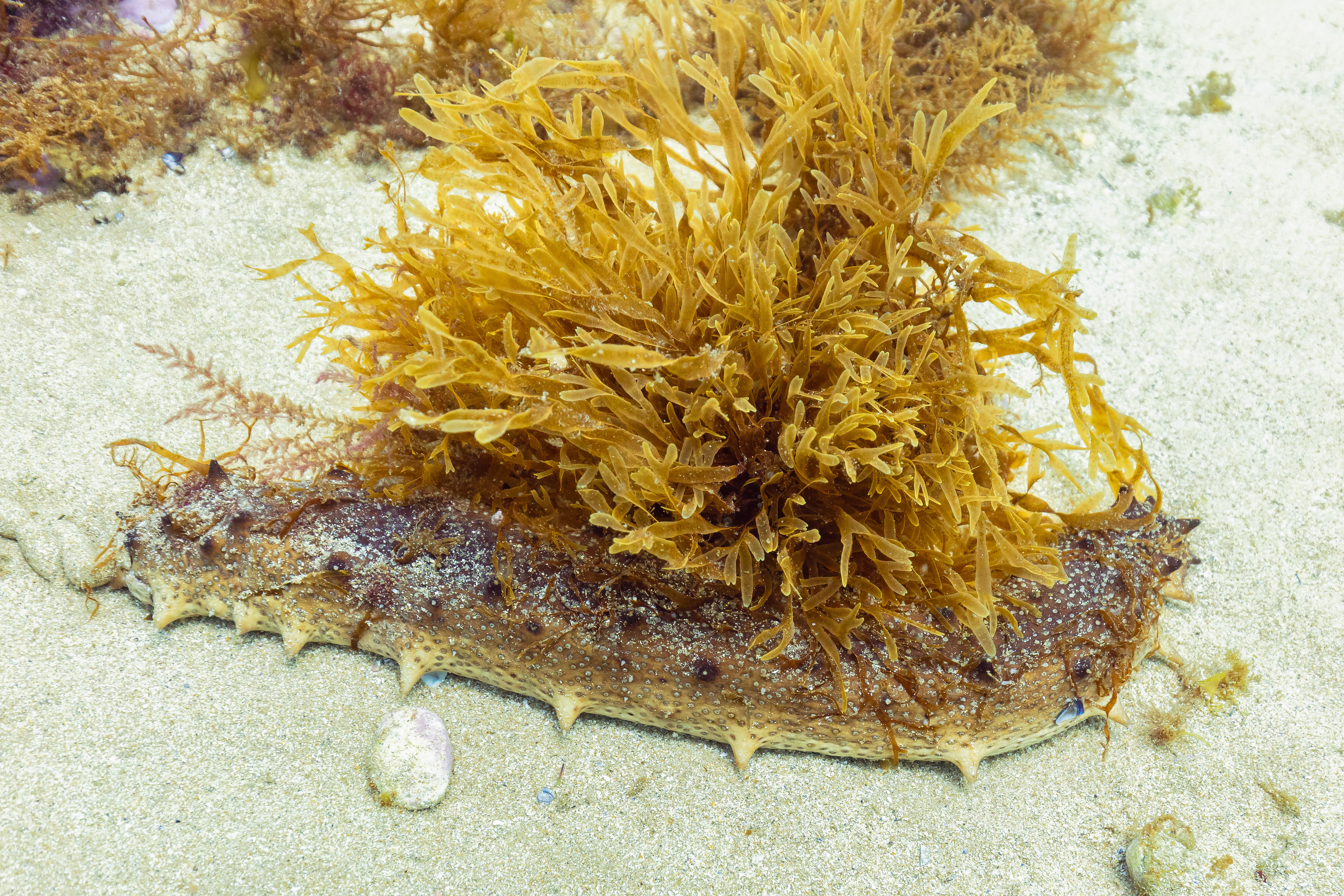

Conservation status
- Data Deficient (IUCN 3.1)

Scientific classification
- Kingdom: Animalia
- Phylum: Echinodermata
- Class: Holothuroidea
- Order: Holothuriida
- Family: Holothuriidae
- Genus: Holothuria
- Species: H. arguinensis

Binomial name
- Holothuria arguinensis Koehler & Vaney, 1906

= Holothuria arguinensis =

Species of sea cucumber

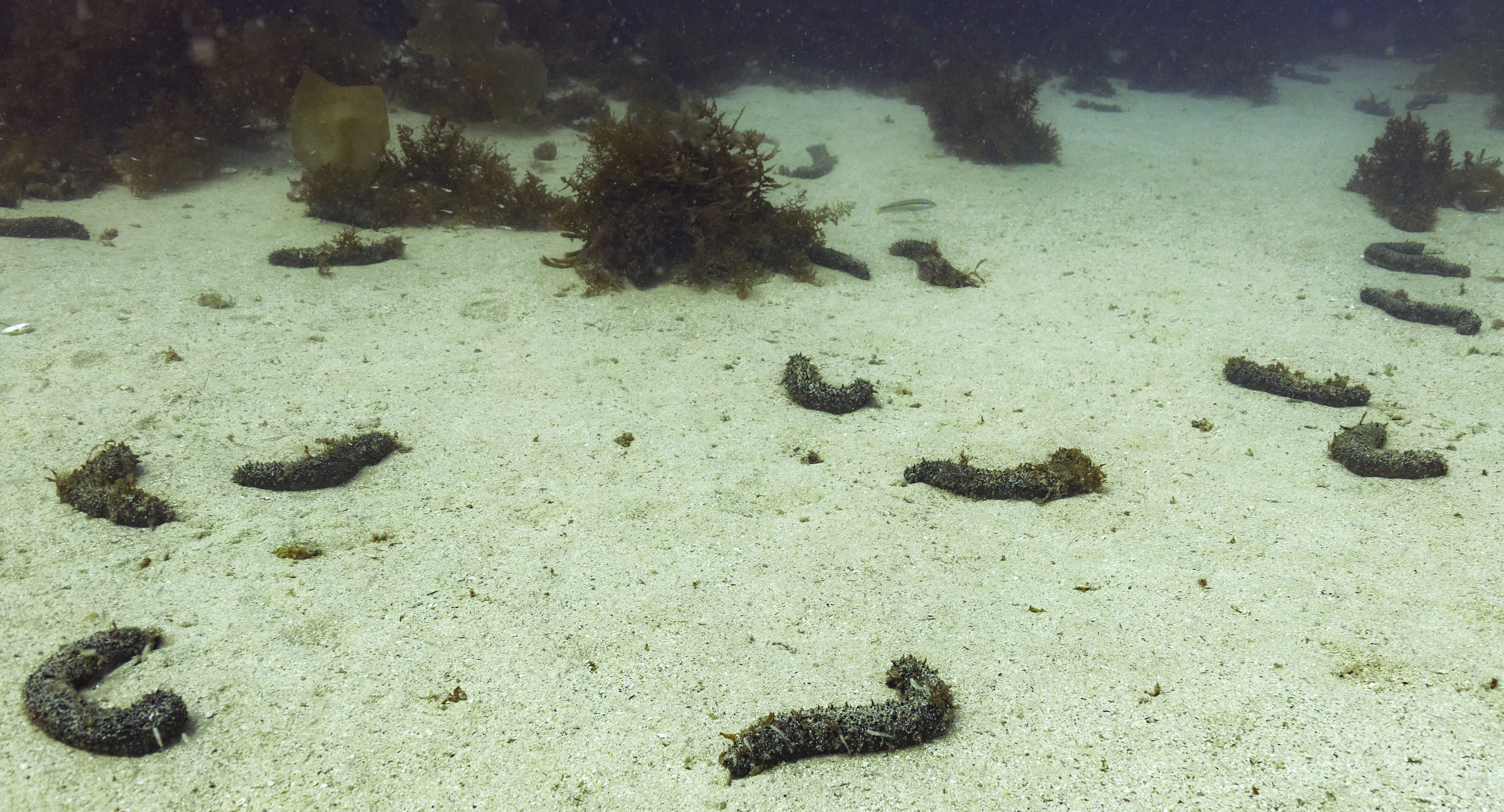
Group of Holothuria arguinensis.

Holothuria arguinensis is a species of sea cucumber in the family Holothuriidae and subgenus Roweothuria. It is found in waters off the northeast Atlantic Ocean and Mediterranean Sea. According to some scholarly research, the species is actively expanding its range and colonizing the south-eastern coast of Spain.

The species lives on sandy and seagrass beds in shallow waters and up to depths of 52 meters. It has a rigid and somewhat cylindrical body. A mature specimen can be 35 cm long and weigh 270 grams. Spawning is in summer to autumn. Reproduction success depends on environmental factors, primarily availability of daylight and water temperature – other likely factors include abundance of food, tidal flow and water salinity. The species is a fishery resource and in demand in Asian markets.
