= Holothuria vemae =

Conservation status
- Data Deficient (IUCN 3.1)

Scientific classification
- Kingdom: Animalia
- Phylum: Echinodermata
- Class: Holothuroidea
- Order: Holothuriida
- Family: Holothuriidae
- Genus: Holothuria
- Species: H. vemae

Binomial name
- Holothuria vemae Thandar, 1988

Species of sea cucumber

Holothuria (Roweothuria) vemae is a species of sea cucumber first described by Thandar in 1988. It is distributed in the south-eastern Atlantic Ocean, specifically off the coast of South Africa.
