= Elisabeth Deichmann =

Danish-born American marine biologist (1896–1975)

Elizabeth Deichmann
- Born: June 12, 1896; Copenhagen, Denmark
- Died: August 9, 1975 (aged 79); Beverly, Massachusetts, US
- Education: University of Copenhagen (M.Sc.); Radcliffe College (Ph.D)
- Awards: Knight of the Order of the Dannebrog; King Christian X's Liberty Medal
- Scientific career
- Fields: Marine biology
- Workplaces: Royal Agricultural College of Copenhagen; British Museum; Museum of Comparative Zoology at Harvard University

Elisabeth Deichmann (June 12, 1896 – August 9, 1975) was a Danish-born American marine biologist. She spent most of her career as a curator at Museum of Comparative Zoology at Harvard University. She was appointed as a Knight of the Danish Order of the Dannebrog for her contributions to zoology and Danish culture.

== Life and work ==
Elisabeth Deichmann was born on 12 June 1896 in Copenhagen, the capital of Denmark, to physician Henrik Deichmann and artist Christine Lund Deichmann. In 1918, she was appointed as assistant zoologist at the Royal Agricultural College of Copenhagen, working for the zoologist Johan Erik Vesti Boas. She received her M.Sc. from the University of Copenhagen in 1922 while continuing to work at the college.

Deichmann received a Danish Rask-Ørsted Foundation grant to study at Stanford University's Hopkins Marine Station in 1924. She worked for the British Museum in 1926. She received her Ph.D from Radcliffe College in 1927 and became assistant zoologist at the United States Bureau of Fisheries at Woods Hole the following year. She received an Agassiz Fellowship at the Museum of Comparative Zoology at Harvard University in 1929 and became assistant curator of marine invertebrates in 1930 under the supervision of Hubert Lyman Clark. She was promoted to curator in 1942 and retired in 1961 but retained an emerita post until her death in 1975. In addition to her curatorial work, she spent the summers of 1931, 1933, and 1936 teaching a course about marine invertebrates at Stanford University.

Deichmann died on 9 August 1975 at the age of 79 in Beverly Farms, Massachusetts.

== Activities and awards ==
Deichmann specialized in echinoderms (Holothuria) and corals (Octocorallia) and discovered several new species. She conducted field work in Cuba, Trinidad, Bermuda, Panama, and Mexico, and on the Atlantic and Pacific coasts of the United States and Canada, collecting specimens for the MCZ collection. She authored some 50 scientific publications and reports between 1920 and 1963.

In 1946, the Danish government awarded her King Christian X's Liberty Medal for her services during World War II. She later became one of the first women to become a Knight of the Order of the Dannebrog for her contributions to zoology and Danish culture.
