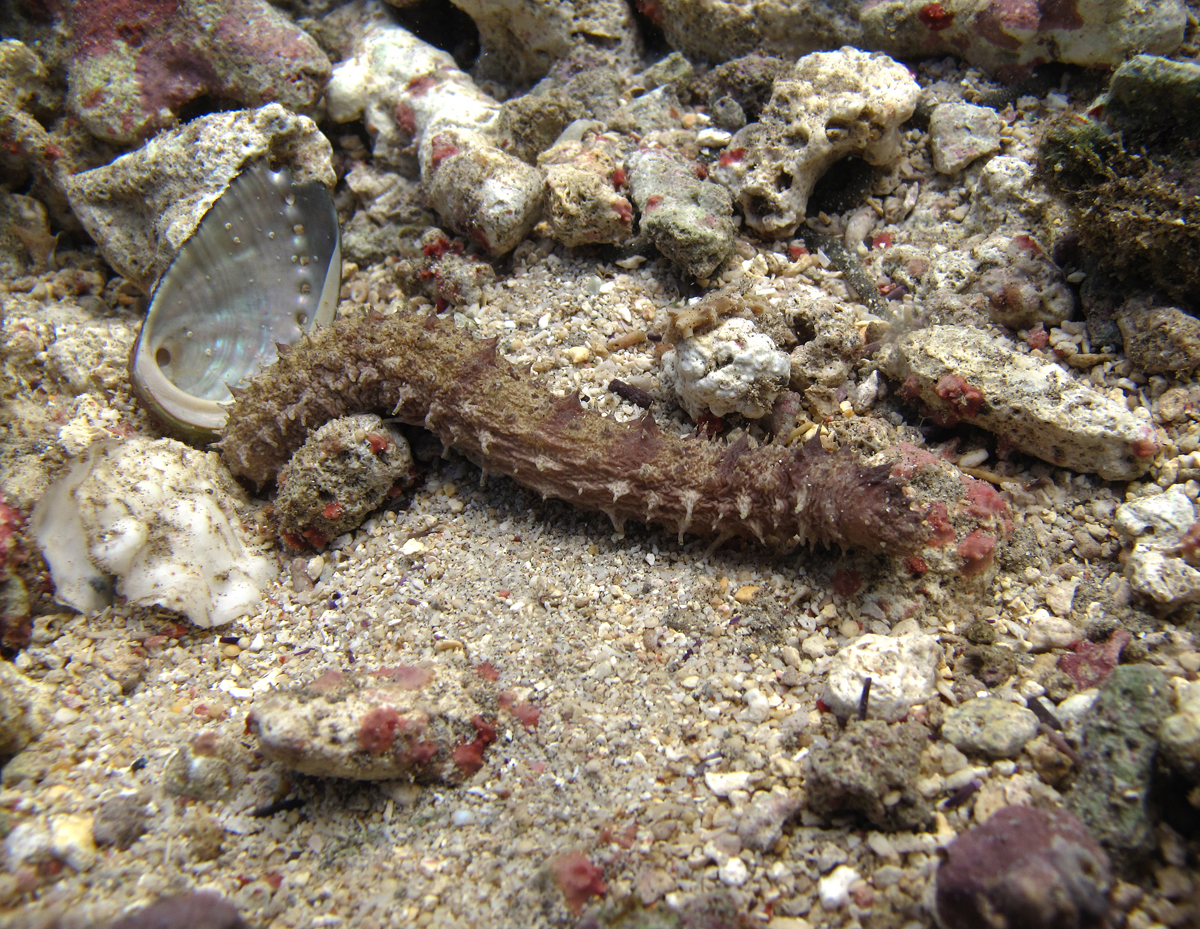

Conservation status
- Data Deficient (IUCN 3.1)

Scientific classification
- Kingdom: Animalia
- Phylum: Echinodermata
- Class: Holothuroidea
- Order: Holothuriida
- Family: Holothuriidae
- Genus: Holothuria
- Species: H. impatiens

Binomial name
- Holothuria impatiens (Forsskål, 1775)

= Holothuria impatiens =

Species of sea cucumber

Holothuria (Thymiosycia) impatiens, commonly known as the impatient sea cucumber or bottleneck sea cucumber, is a species of sea cucumber in the genus Holothuria, subgenus Thymiosycia.

== Description ==
Holothuria impatiens has an elongated cylindrical body and grows to a length of about 15 cm (6 in). The leathery skin is mottled brown, grey or purplish-brown, often banded in alternating bands of pale and dark colour. The surface is covered with low, rounded papillae, feeling rough to the touch, and this distinguishes this species from the otherwise similar Holothuria hilla. Some of the papillae are surrounded by concentric brown rings. Embedded in the skin are bony ossicles in the form of smooth rounded buttons and square tables. There is a crown of about twenty tentacles at the anterior, thinner end, and this end may be darker in colour than the posterior end.

== Distribution and habitat ==
Holothuria impatiens has a wide distribution, its range including the tropical Indo-Pacific, the tropical western Atlantic Ocean, the Caribbean Sea and the Gulf of Mexico, and the Mediterranean Sea and coasts of France. It is typically found on reef flats, in lagoons, or in open areas, usually underneath rocks or coral rubble, at depths from about 2 m (7 ft) down to 40 m (100 ft).

== Ecology ==
Holothuria impatiens may get its common name from the fact that it readily expels sticky cuvierian tubules (enlargements of the respiratory tree that float freely in the body cavity) when handled, a defensive strategy that distracts potential predators. This sea cucumber is nocturnal and very cryptic: it prefers to dwell in small crevices. Having found a suitable crack, it relaxes its longitudinal muscles and works its way into the crevice, then stiffens its collagen fibres to make itself secure. When feeding, it only half-emerges from the crack. It is a deposit feeder, sifting through the sediment with its feeding tentacles and ingesting the dead biological material it finds, such as fragments of seaweed.

On the Great Barrier Reef, Australia, reproduction takes place once a year, in late spring or early summer. Females produce a small number of large eggs; some related species of sea cucumbers additionally reproduce asexually by transverse fission, but H. impatiens has never been observed to do this.
