= Holothuria bacilla =

Conservation status
- Data Deficient (IUCN 3.1)

Scientific classification
- Kingdom: Animalia
- Phylum: Echinodermata
- Class: Holothuroidea
- Order: Holothuriida
- Family: Holothuriidae
- Genus: Holothuria
- Species: H. bacilla

Binomial name
- Holothuria bacilla Cherbonnier, 1988

Species of sea cucumber

Holothuria (Selenkothuria) bacilla is a species of sea cucumber in the genus Holothuria, subgenus Selenkothuria. First described by Cherbonnier in 1988, the species is found in the Indian Ocean off the coast of Madagascar. One source has also recorded the species as being present in the Persian Gulf. The cucumber is a mobile bottom feeder and lives at a depth of between 5–10 cm.
