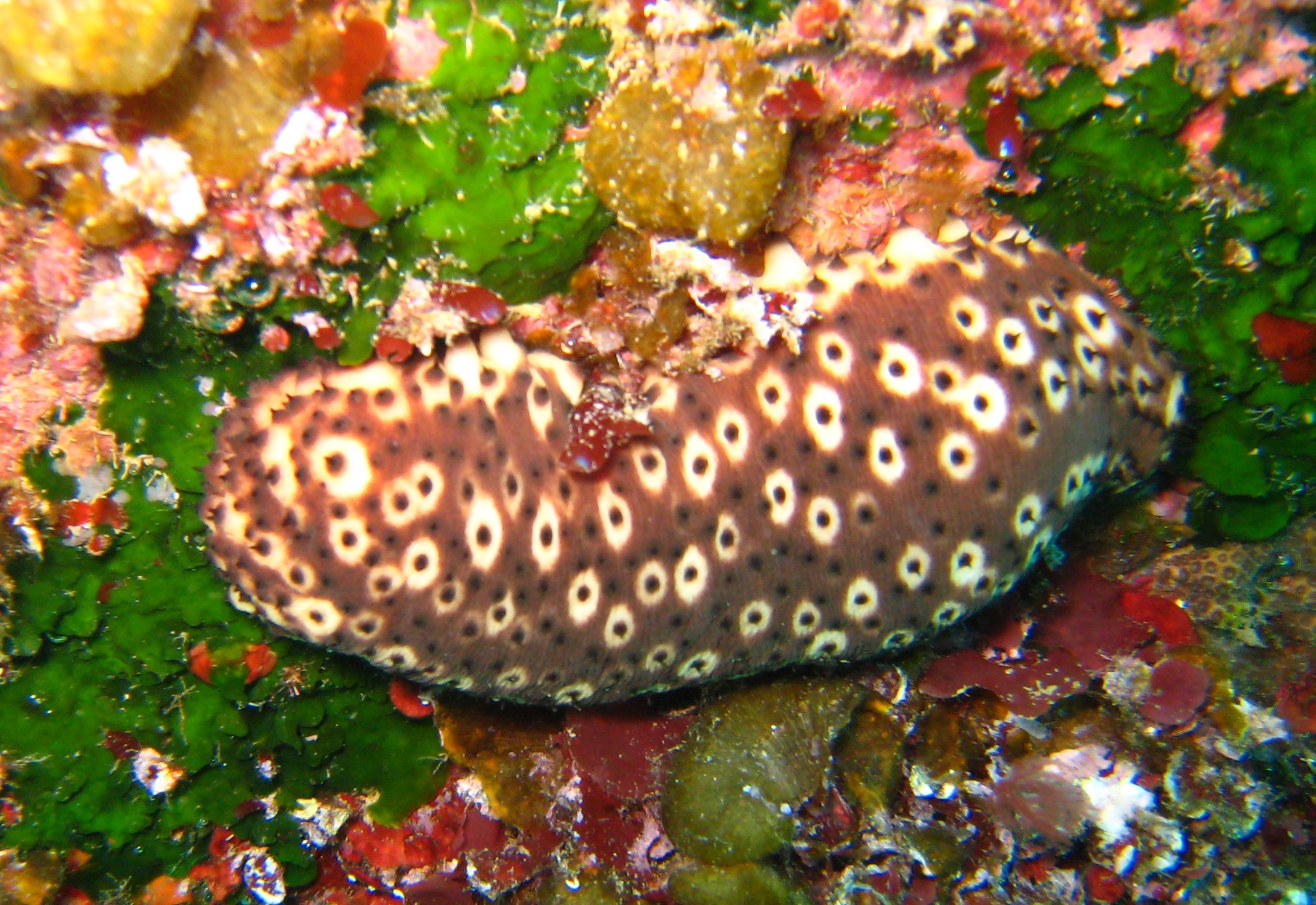

Conservation status
- Least Concern (IUCN 3.1)

Scientific classification
- Kingdom: Animalia
- Phylum: Echinodermata
- Class: Holothuroidea
- Order: Holothuriida
- Family: Holothuriidae
- Genus: Holothuria
- Species: H. sanctori

Binomial name
- Holothuria sanctori Delle Chiaje, 1823

= Holothuria sanctori =

Species of sea cucumber

Holothuria sanctori is a species of sea cucumber in the genus Holothuria.
