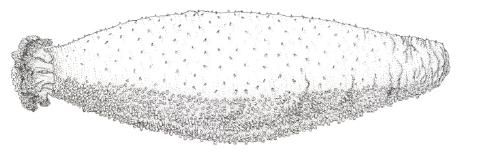
- Sketch of Holothuria glaberrima

Conservation status
- Least Concern (IUCN 3.1)

Scientific classification
- Kingdom: Animalia
- Phylum: Echinodermata
- Class: Holothuroidea
- Order: Holothuriida
- Family: Holothuriidae
- Genus: Holothuria
- Species: H. glaberrima

Binomial name
- Holothuria glaberrima Selenka, 1867

= Holothuria glaberrima =

Species of sea cucumber

Holothuria (Selenkothuria) glaberrima, also known as the brown rock sea cucumber, is a species of sea cucumber in the genus Holothuria, subgenus Selenkothuria. The cucumber is distributed in the Western Atlantic Ocean, the Caribbean Sea, and the Gulf of Mexico. The species is found at a depth of 0–42 meters.

== Description ==
The body of Holothuria glaberrima is cigar-shaped, with a whorl of twenty bushy feeding tentacles at the anterior end surrounding the mouth. The cuticle is leathery and tough; the dorsal surface is smooth, while the ventral surface or "sole" bears three longitudinal rows of dark brown tube feet. This sea cucumber grows to a length of 10 to 15 cm (4 to 6 in). The general colour is blackish, dark brown or occasionally grey, without any spots, while the tentacles are black.

== Distribution and habitat ==
Holothuria glaberrima is native to the tropical western Atlantic Ocean, the Caribbean Sea and the Gulf of Mexico; its range includes the West Indies. Florida, Mexico, Honduras, Nicaragua, Costa Rica, Panama, Colombia, Venezuela, Guyana, Suriname, French Guiana and Brazil. It occurs at depths down to about 42 m (140 ft). It lives under rocks in areas with considerable water movement.

== Research ==
Sea cucumbers are able to regenerate their complete digestive systems and grow back most parts of the body following injury. Because of this, and because of the closeness of the relationship of echinoderms to vertebrates, sea cucumbers have been used in regeneration research. Holothuria glaberrima has been widely used as a model organism for this purpose, and to facilitate these studies, the genome has been sequenced.
