= Holothuria cubana =

Conservation status
- Least Concern (IUCN 3.1)

Scientific classification
- Kingdom: Animalia
- Phylum: Echinodermata
- Class: Holothuroidea
- Order: Holothuriida
- Family: Holothuriidae
- Genus: Holothuria
- Species: H. cubana

Binomial name
- Holothuria cubana (Ludwig, 1875)

Species of echinoderm

Holothuria (Cystipus) cubana is a species of sea cucumber in the family Holothuriidae. This species was first described by Ludwig in 1875.

== Description ==
Holothuria cubana live at a depth of 0–7 meters and grow to a length of 15 cm. Individuals have a cylindrical body with a mouth and anus on opposite ends. Young individuals are soft and have a light coloration. Papillae begin to appear on the dorsal surface as the individual grows. They have suckered pedicels, which too increase in number as the animal grows. Adults take on a rougher texture and have dark gray bodies with brown spots and a white underside.

== Biology ==
Like some other sea cucumbers, the calcareous ossicles found in Holothuria cubana can serve as indicators for the animal's growth. The tentacles of small individuals are supported by thin, curved rods. In juveniles, these rods have distinctive perforated ends. These perforated rods shorten and are less frequently present in large specimens, which are instead covered in knob-like buttons. Individuals have one gonad each and engage in external fertilization, as most Holothurians partake in broadcast spawning. Holothurians are known to sift through sediment to eat coral rubble, algae, microorganisms and detritus, and can filter water to find food.

== Ecology ==
Specimens have been found throughout the western central Atlantic Ocean, the Gulf of Mexico, and the Caribbean Sea. They have been observed to position themselves under objects or sand, making them difficult to spot. Commercial harvesting has led to declines and extinctions of sea cucumber species throughout the Indo-Pacific. Harvesting efforts have in turn increased in the Americas, in places including Mexico, Nicaragua, and Panama. Recovery can be slow for exploited Holothurian populations, and individuals can experience shrinkage after exposure to nutritional stress or environmental conditions. Holothurians contribute to nutrient cycling in reef ecosystems as they eat bacteria, diatoms and detritus.
