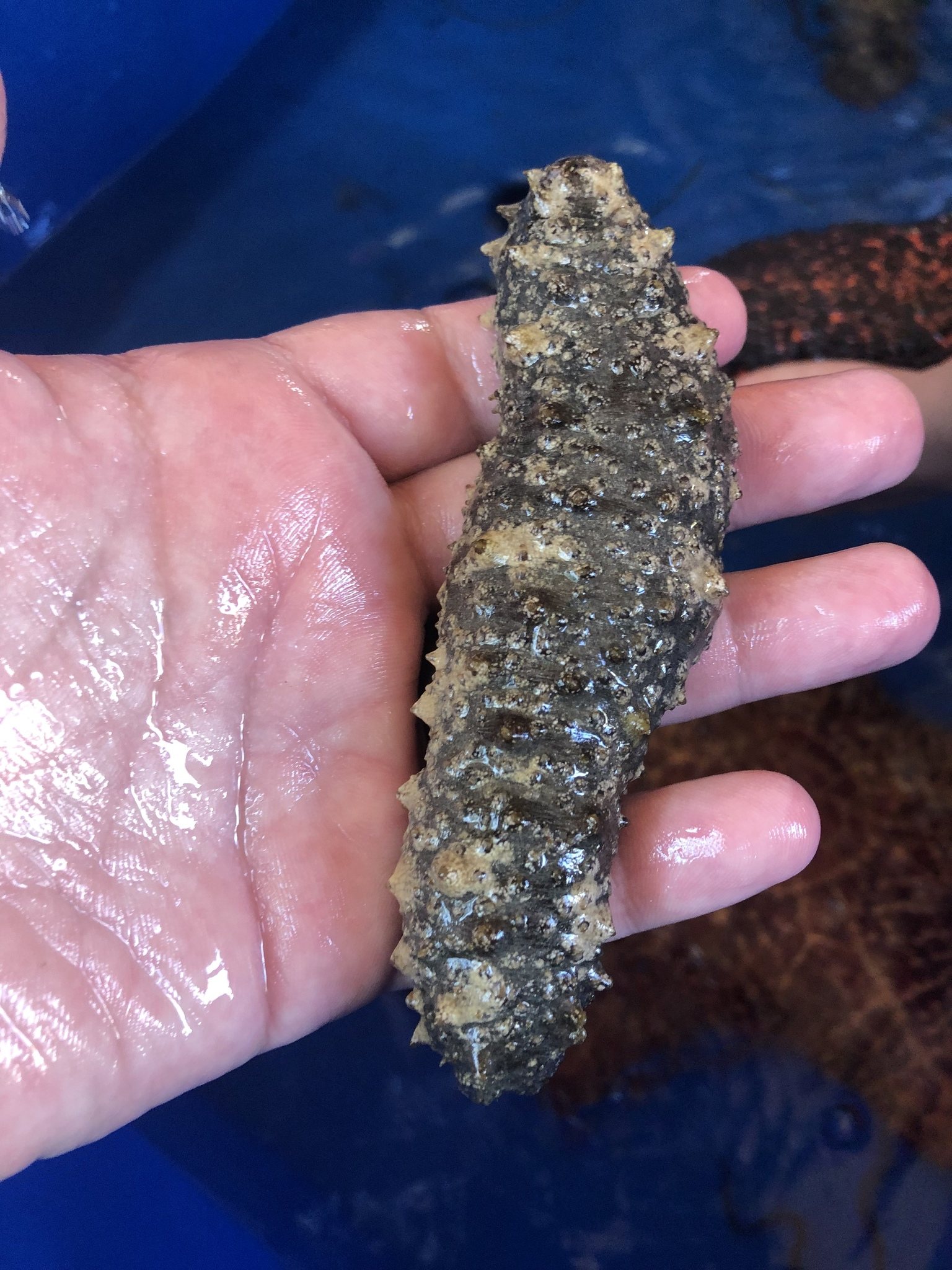

Conservation status
- Least Concern (IUCN 3.1)

Scientific classification
- Kingdom: Animalia
- Phylum: Echinodermata
- Class: Holothuroidea
- Order: Holothuriida
- Family: Holothuriidae
- Genus: Holothuria
- Species: H. floridana

Binomial name
- Holothuria floridana Pourtalés, 1851

Synonyms
- Cuvieria (Holothuria) floridana Pourtalès, 1851; Holothuria heilprini Ives, 1890; Holothuria nitida Ives, 1890; Holothuria silamensis Ives, 1890

= Holothuria floridana =

Species of sea cucumber

Holothuria floridana, the Florida sea cucumber, is a species of marine invertebrate in the family Holothuriidae. It is found on the seabed just below the low tide mark in Florida, the Gulf of Mexico, the Bahamas and the Caribbean.

== Description ==
Holothuria floridana can grow to a length of up to 8 inches (20 cm). It has an elongated cylindrical shape with a tough, leathery skin with blunt conical protuberances. On the underside it has several rows of short tube feet. On one end is the mouth surrounded by a ring of feeding tentacles. The body colour is mottled brown, fawn and white.

== Distribution and habitat ==
It is found at depths of up to 5 metres (16 ft) on sand and on seagrass beds in the Caribbean Sea, Gulf of Mexico and the coasts of Florida.

== Biology ==
It moves across the sandy seabed sifting through the sand with its tentacles and feeding on detritus and other organic particles.Holothuria floridana undergoes gametogenesis, a biological process to produce gametes for reproduction, during the spring and summer seasons. Reproduction is driven by temperature levels. Scientists discovered that its gonads maturity is dependent on temperature, with optimal maturity and maximum reproduction output at 28 degrees Celsius water (Ramos-Miranda et al., 2017).
