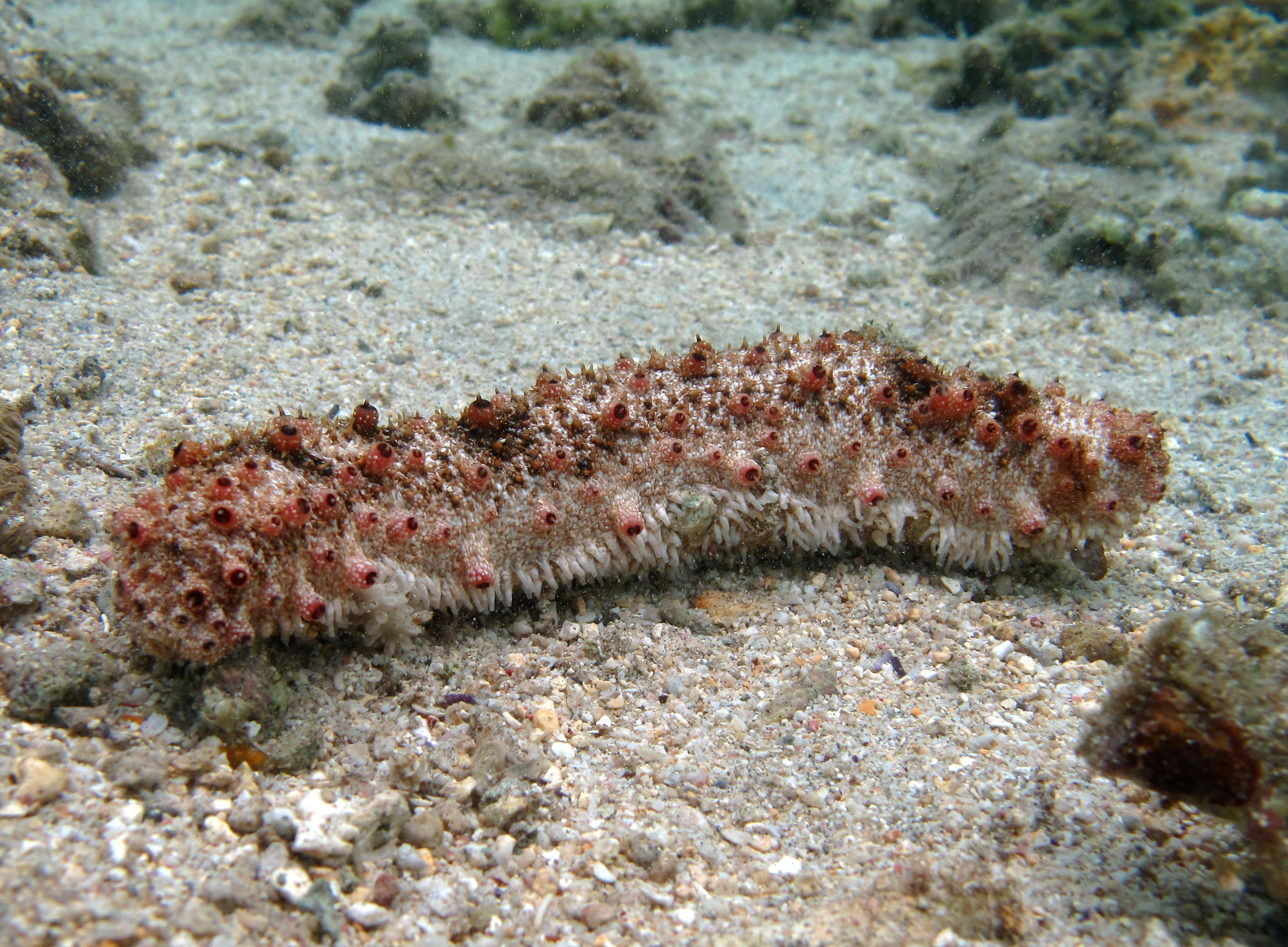
- Holothuria pervicax

Scientific classification
- Kingdom: Animalia
- Phylum: Echinodermata
- Class: Holothuroidea
- Order: Holothuriida
- Family: Holothuriidae
- Genus: Holothuria; Linnaeus, 1767

Type species
- Holothuria tubulosa Gmelin, 1791

Species
- Over 100, see text.

Synonyms
- Ananus Sluiter, 1880

= Holothuria =

Genus of echinoderms

Holothuria is the type genus of the marine animal family Holothuriidae, part of the class Holothuroidea, commonly known as sea cucumbers. Members of the genus are found in coastal waters in tropical and temperate regions. They are soft-bodied, limbless invertebrates which dwell on the ocean floor and are usually detritivores. They resemble a cucumber in form. The genus contains some species that are harvested and sold as food.

== Species ==
The World Register of Marine Species recognizes 163 species in 19 subgenera of Holothuria:

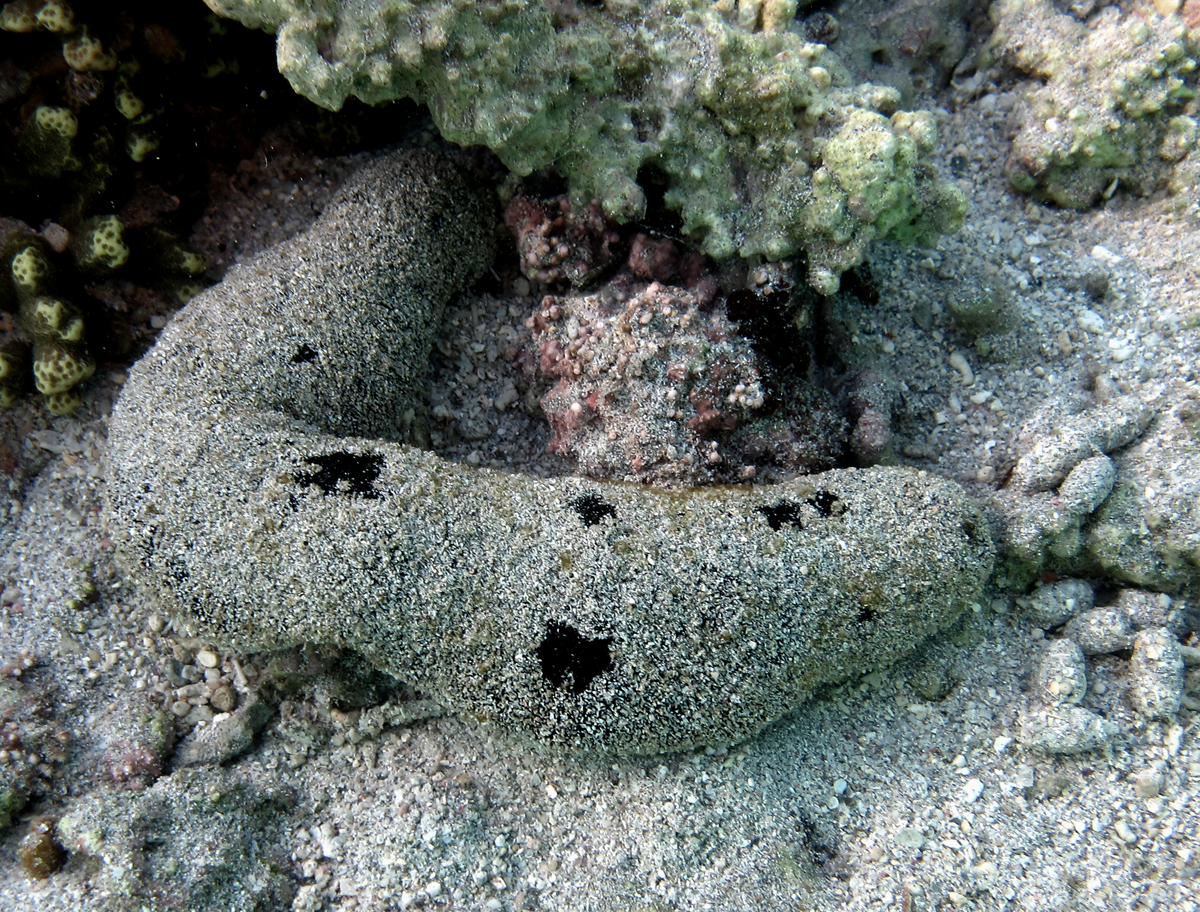
Holothuria atra

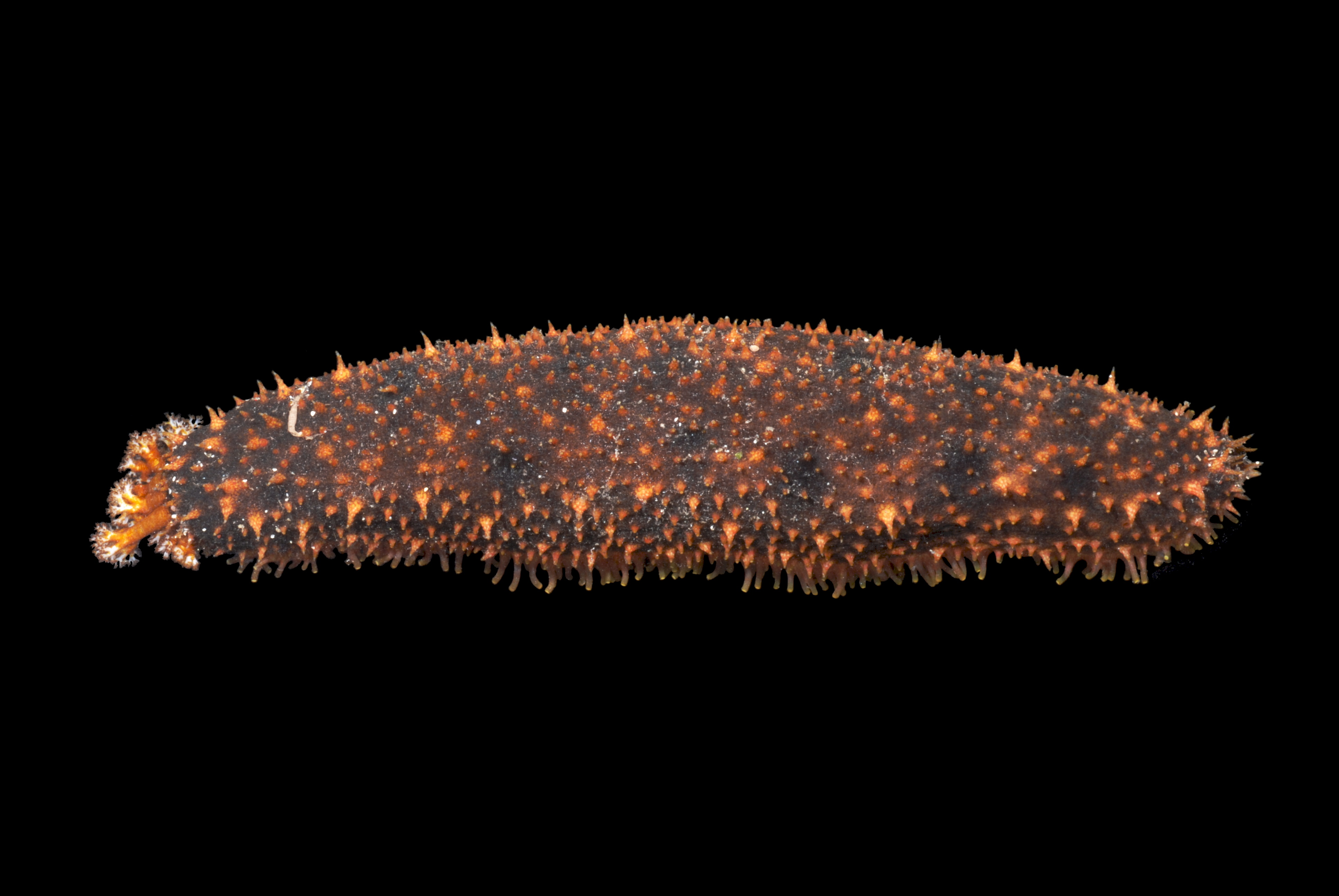
Holothuria cinerascens

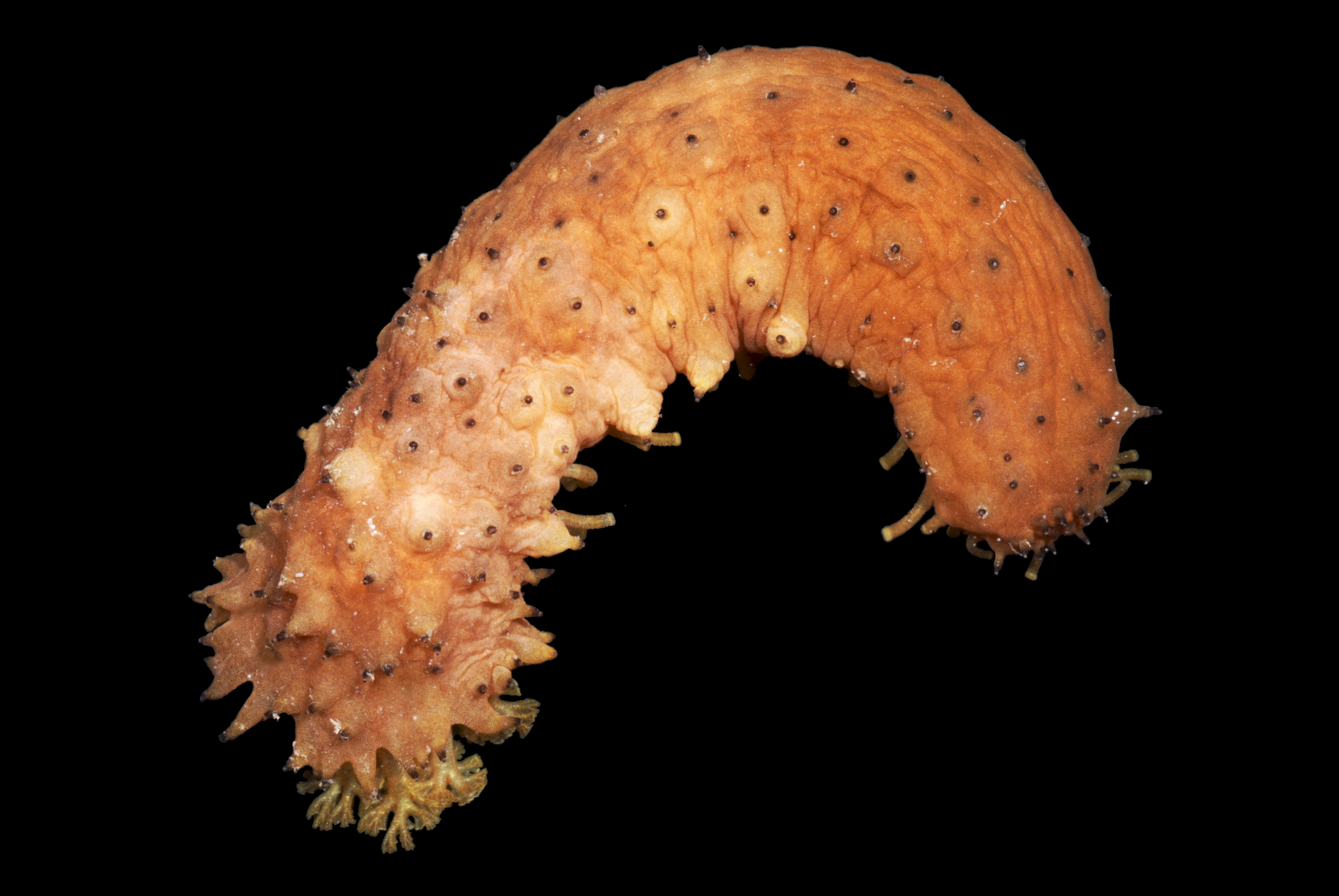
Holothuria difficilis

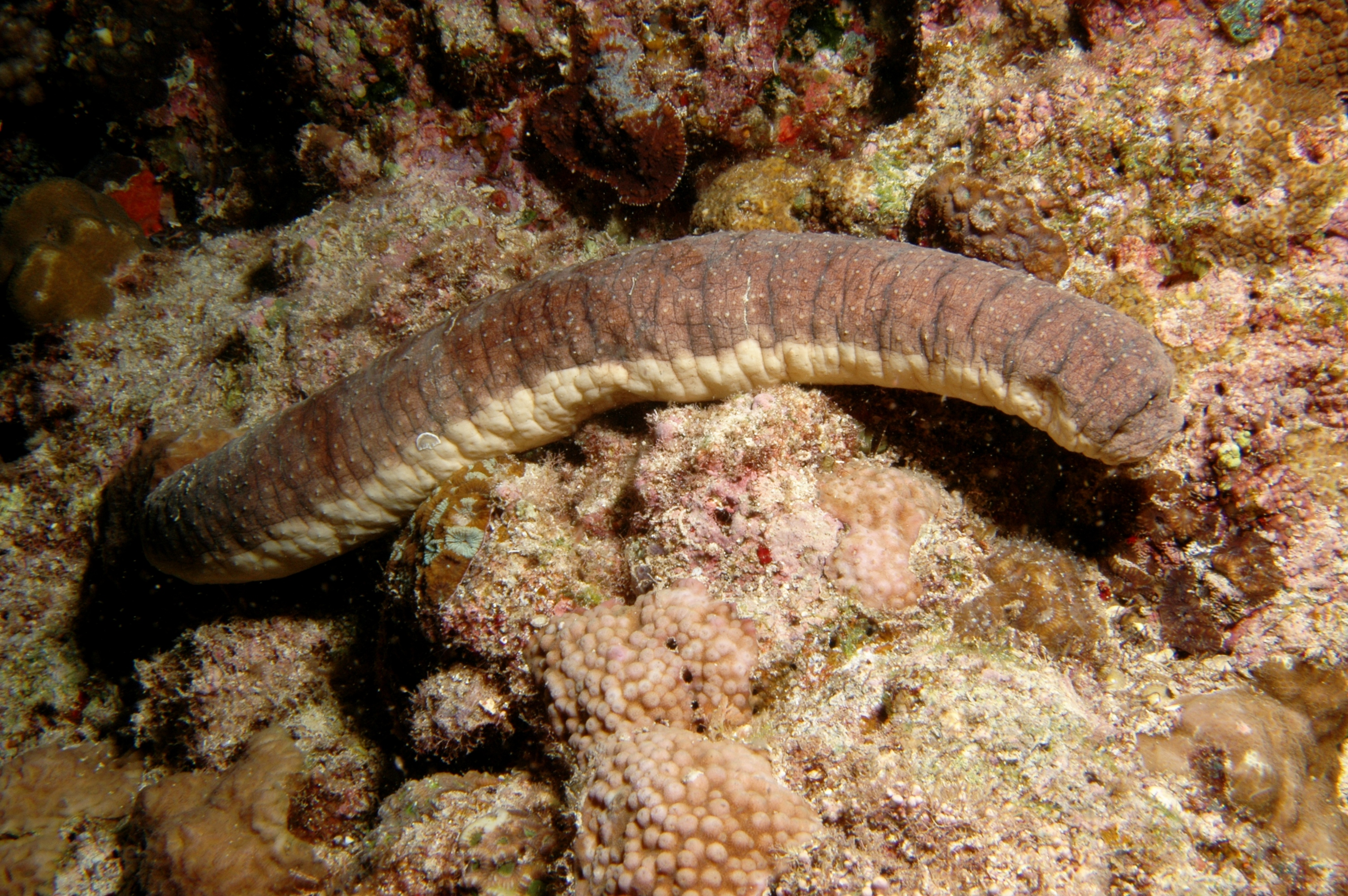
Holothuria edulis

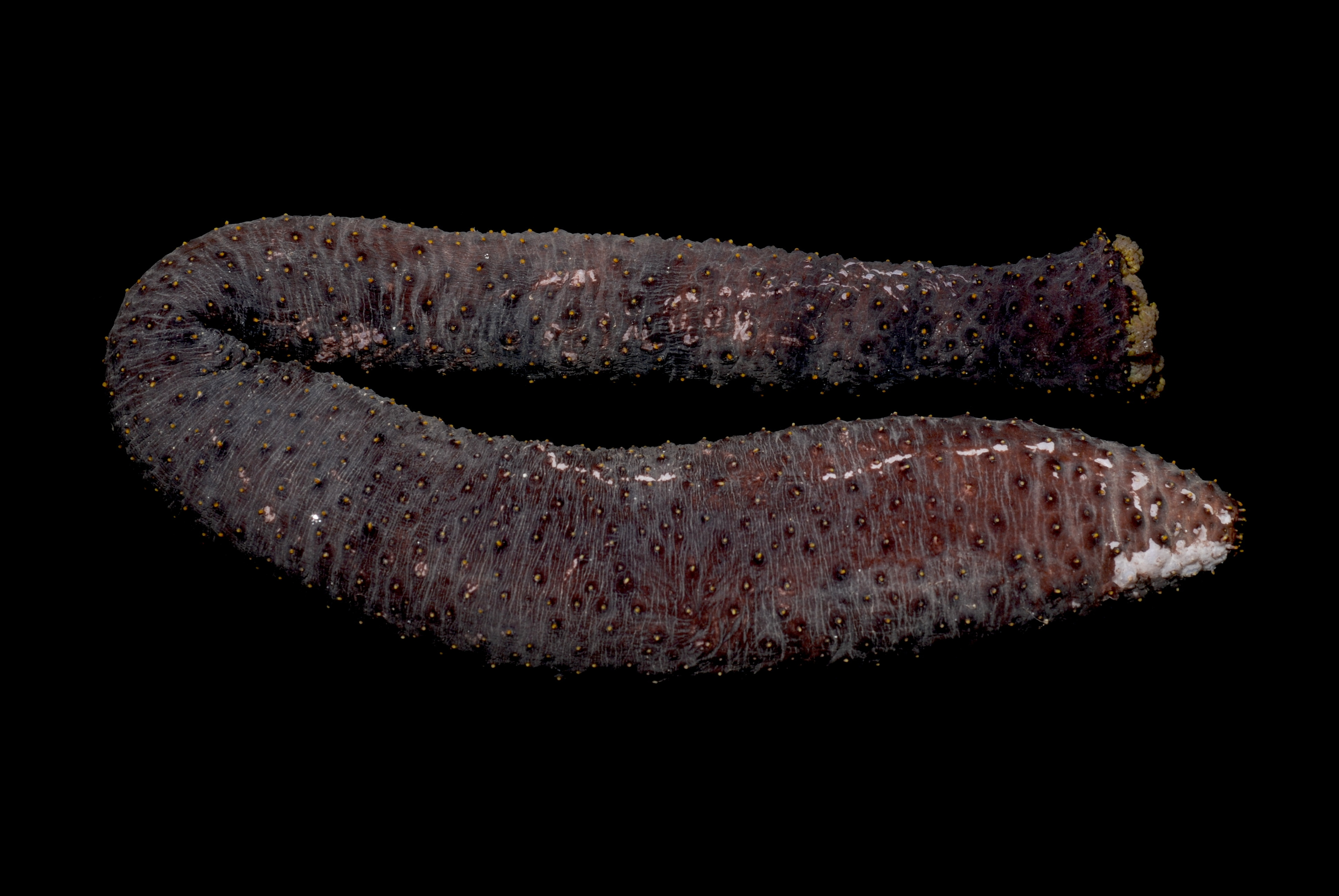
Holothuria flavomaculata

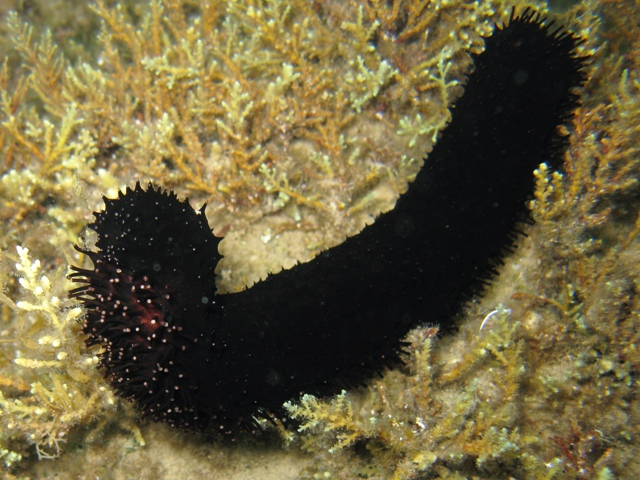
Holothuria forskali

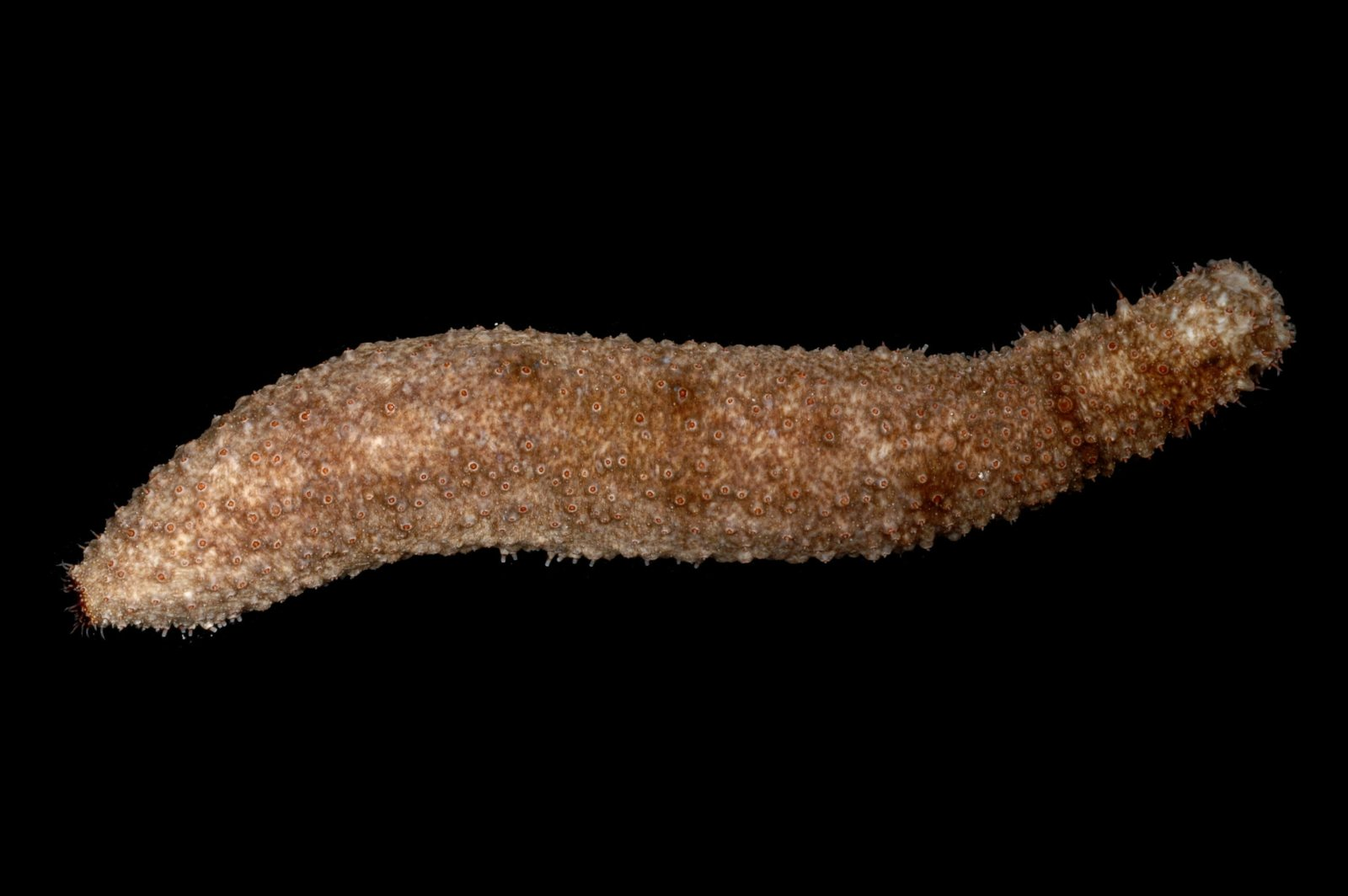
Holothuria fuscocinerea

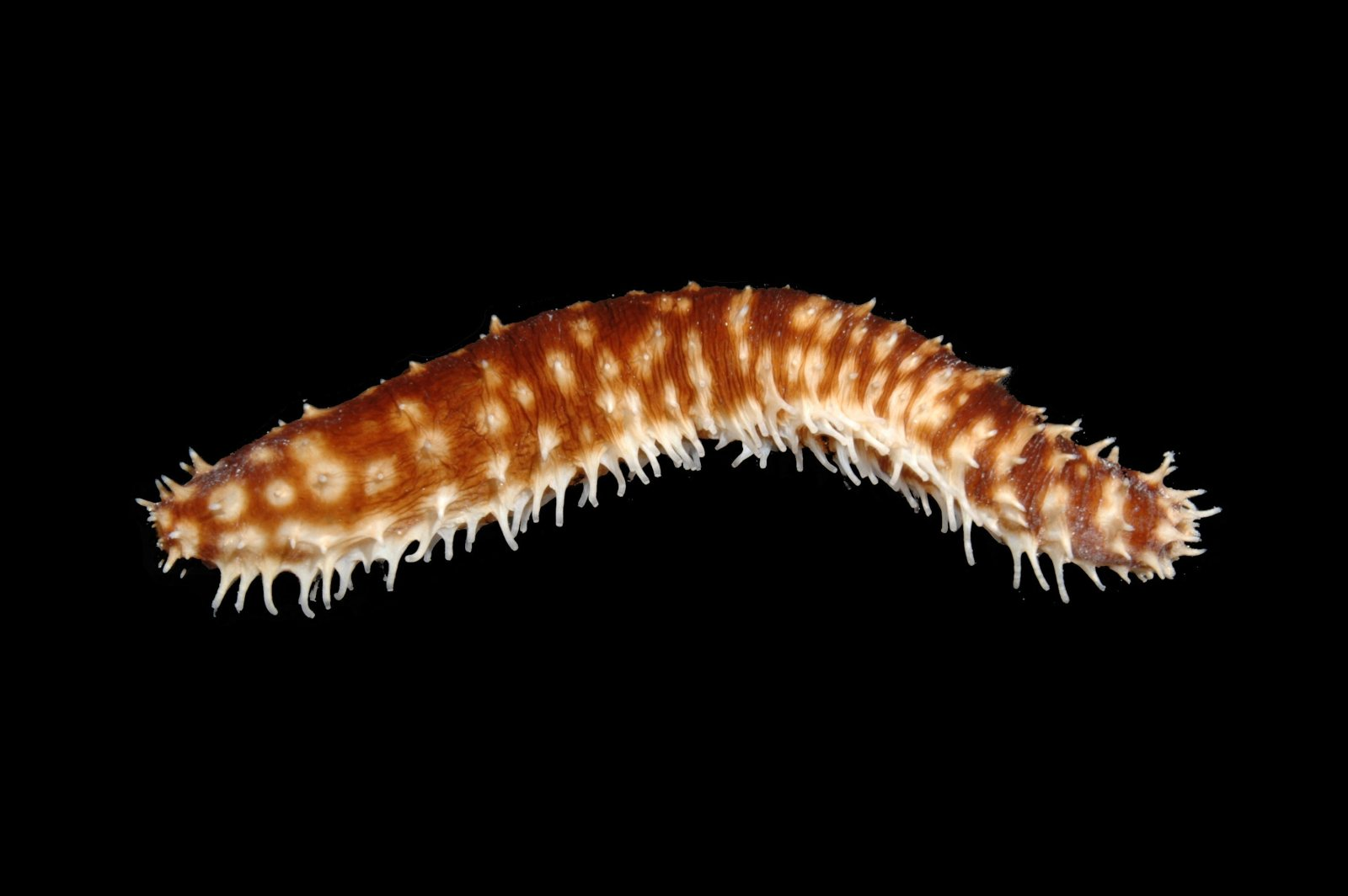
Holothuria hilla

- Subgenus Acanthotrapeza Rowe, 1969
  - Holothuria coluber Semper, 1868
  - Holothuria kubaryi Ludwig, 1875
  - Holothuria pyxis Selenka, 1867
  - Holothuria tripilata Massin, 1987
- Subgenus Cystipus Haacke, 1880
  - Holothuria casoae Laguarda-Figueras & Solís-Marín, 2009
  - Holothuria cubana Ludwig, 1875
  - Holothuria dura Cherbonnier & Féral, 1981
  - Holothuria hartmeyeri (Helfer, 1912)
  - Holothuria inhabilis Selenka, 1867
  - Holothuria jousseaumei Cherbonnier, 1954
  - Holothuria mammosa Cherbonnier, 1988
  - Holothuria occidentalis Ludwig, 1875
  - Holothuria pseudofossor Deichmann, 1930
  - Holothuria rigida Selenka, 1867
  - Holothuria sucosa Erwe, 1919
  - Holothuria turrisimperfecta Cherbonnier, 1965
  - Holothuria yann Samyn in Samyn & Vandenspiegel, 2016
- Subgenus Halodeima Pearson, 1914
  - Holothuria enalia Lampert, 1885
  - Holothuria floridana Pourtalés, 1851
  - Holothuria grisea Selenka, 1867
  - Holothuria inornata Semper, 1868
  - Holothuria manningi Pawson, 1978
  - Holothuria mexicana Ludwig, 1875
  - Holothuria nigralutea O'Loughlin, 2007
  - Holothuria pulla Selenka, 1867
  - Holothuria signata Ludwig, 1875
- Subgenus Holothuria Linnaeus, 1767
  - Holothuria algeriensis Mezali, Thandar & Khodja, 2021
  - Holothuria caparti Cherbonnier, 1965
  - Holothuria dakarensis Panning, 1939
  - Holothuria fungosa Helfer, 1912
  - Holothuria helleri Marenzeller von, 1877
  - Holothuria mammata Grube, 1840
  - Holothuria massaspicula Cherbonnier, 1954
  - Holothuria nobilis Selenka, 1867
  - Holothuria stellati Delle Chiaje, 1824
  - Holothuria tubulosa Gmelin, 1791
- Subgenus Lessonothuria Deichmann, 1958
  - Holothuria cavans Massin & Tomascik, 1996
  - Holothuria coronata Yáñez Villanueva, Solís-Marín & Laguarda-Figueras, 2022
  - Holothuria cumulus Clark, 1921
  - Holothuria duoturricula Cherbonnier, 1988
  - Holothuria glandifera Cherbonnier, 1955
  - Holothuria immobilis Semper, 1868
  - Holothuria insignis Ludwig, 1875
  - Holothuria lineata Ludwig, 1875
  - Holothuria multipilula Liao, 1975
  - Holothuria pardalis Selenka, 1867
  - Holothuria tuberculata Thandar, 2007
  - Holothuria verrucosa Selenka, 1867
- Subgenus Mertensiothuria Deichmann, 1958
  - Holothuria albofusca Cherbonnier, 1988
  - Holothuria aphanes Lampert, 1885
  - Holothuria artensis Cherbonnier & Féral, 1984
  - Holothuria fuscorubra Théel, 1886
  - Holothuria hilla Lesson, 1830
  - Holothuria isuga Mitsukuri, 1912
  - Holothuria viridiaurantia Borrero-Pérez & Vanegas-González, 2019
- Subgenus Metriatyla Rowe, 1969
  - Holothuria aculeata Semper, 1868
  - Holothuria albiventer Semper, 1868
  - Holothuria alex Samyn in Samyn & Vandenspiegel, 2016
  - Holothuria brauni Helfer, 1912
  - Holothuria conica Clark, 1938
  - Holothuria cyrielle Vandenspiegel in Samyn & Vandenspiegel, 2016
  - Holothuria horrida Massin, 1987
  - Holothuria keesingi O'Loughlin in O'Loughlin et al., 2016
  - Holothuria lessoni Massin, Uthicke, Purcell, Rowe, Samyn, 2009
  - Holothuria martensii Semper, 1868
  - Holothuria submersa Sluiter, 1901
  - Holothuria tortonesei Cherbonnier, 1979
- Subgenus Microthele Brandt, 1835
  - Holothuria fuscogilva Cherbonnier, 1980
  - Holothuria fuscopunctata Jaeger, 1833
- Subgenus Panningothuria Rowe, 1969
  - Holothuria austrinabassa O'Loughlin, 2007
- Subgenus Platyperona Rowe, 1969
  - Holothuria crosnieri Cherbonnier, 1988
  - Holothuria difficilis Semper, 1868
  - Holothuria excellens (Ludwig, 1875)
  - Holothuria insolita Cherbonnier, 1988
  - Holothuria parvula (Selenka, 1867)
  - Holothuria rowei Pawson & Gust, 1981
  - Holothuria samoana Ludwig, 1875
  - Holothuria sanctori Delle Chiaje, 1823
- Subgenus Roweothuria Thandar, 1988
  - Holothuria arguinensis Koehler & Vaney, 1906
  - Holothuria poli Delle Chiaje, 1824
  - Holothuria vemae Thandar, 1988
- Subgenus Selenkothuria Deichmann, 1958
  - Holothuria bacilla Cherbonnier, 1988
  - Holothuria carere Honey-Escandón, Solís-Marín & Laguarda-Figueras, 2011
  - Holothuria erinacea Semper, 1868
  - Holothuria glaberrima Selenka, 1867
  - Holothuria lubrica Selenka, 1867
  - Holothuria mactanensis Tan Tiu, 1981
  - Holothuria moebii Ludwig, 1883
  - Holothuria parva Krauss in Lampert, 1885
  - Holothuria parvispinea Massin, 2013
  - Holothuria portovallartensis Caso, 1954
  - Holothuria sinica Liao, 1980
  - Holothuria theeli Deichmann, 1938
  - Holothuria vittalonga Cherbonnier, 1988
- Subgenus Semperothuria Deichmann, 1958
  - Holothuria granosa Cherbonnier, 1988
  - Holothuria imitans Ludwig, 1875
  - Holothuria languens Selenka, 1867
  - Holothuria roseomaculata Kerr, 2013
  - Holothuria surinamensis Ludwig, 1875
- Subgenus Stauropora Rowe, 1969
  - Holothuria aemula Sluiter, 1914
  - Holothuria anulifera Fisher, 1907
  - Holothuria bo Samyn in Samyn & Vandenspiegel, 2016
  - Holothuria discrepans Semper, 1868
  - Holothuria dofleinii Augustin, 1908
  - Holothuria fuscocinerea Jaeger, 1833
  - Holothuria hawaiiensis Fisher, 1907
  - Holothuria mitis Sluiter, 1901
  - Holothuria modesta Ludwig, 1875
  - Holothuria olivacea Ludwig, 1888
  - Holothuria pervicax Selenka, 1867
  - Holothuria pluricuriosa Deichmann, 1937
- Subgenus Stichothuria Cherbonnier, 1980
  - Holothuria coronopertusa Cherbonnier, 1980
- Subgenus Theelothuria Deichmann, 1958
  - Holothuria asperita Cherbonnier & Féral, 1981
  - Holothuria cadelli Bell, 1887
  - Holothuria duoturriforma Thandar, 2007
  - Holothuria foresti Cherbonnier & Féral, 1981
  - Holothuria hamata Pearson, 1913
  - Holothuria imperator Deichmann, 1930
  - Holothuria klunzingeri Lampert, 1885
  - Holothuria kurti Ludwig, 1891
  - Holothuria longicosta Thandar, 2007
  - Holothuria maculosa Pearson, 1913
  - Holothuria michaelseni Erwe, 1913
  - Holothuria notabilis Ludwig, 1875
  - Holothuria paraprinceps Deichmann, 1937
  - Holothuria princeps Selenka, 1867
  - Holothuria pseudonotabilis Thandar, 2007
  - Holothuria spinifera Théel, 1886
  - Holothuria squamifera Semper, 1868
  - Holothuria turriscelsa Cherbonnier, 1980
- Subgenus Thymiosycia Pearson, 1914
  - Holothuria altaturricula Cherbonnier & Féral, 1984
  - Holothuria arenicola Semper, 1868
  - Holothuria conusalba Cherbonnier & Féral, 1984
  - Holothuria gracilis Semper, 1868
  - Holothuria impatiens (Forskål, 1775)
  - Holothuria macroperona Clark, 1938
  - Holothuria marginata Sluiter, 1901
  - Holothuria milloti Cherbonnier, 1988
  - Holothuria minax Théel, 1886
  - Holothuria remollescens Lampert, 1885
  - Holothuria strigosa Selenka, 1867
  - Holothuria thomasi Pawson & Caycedo, 1980
  - Holothuria truncata Lampert, 1885
  - Holothuria unicolor Selenka, 1867
  - Holothuria zihuatanensis Caso, 1964
- Subgenus Vaneyothuria Pearson, 1914
  - Holothuria integra Koehler & Vaney, 1908
  - Holothuria lentiginosa Marenzeller von, 1892
  - Holothuria sinefibula Cherbonnier, 1964
  - Holothuria suspecta Cherbonnier, 1958
  - Holothuria uncia Rowe, 1989
  - Holothuria zacae Deichmann, 1937
- Subgenus incertae sedis (uncertain placement)
  - Holothuria arenacava Samyn, Massin & Muthiga, 2001
  - Holothuria atra Jaeger, 1833
  - Holothuria cinerascens (Brandt, 1835)
  - Holothuria edulis Lesson, 1830
  - Holothuria flavomaculata Semper, 1868
  - Holothuria forskali Delle Chiaje, 1823
  - Holothuria kefersteinii (Selenka, 1867)
  - Holothuria leucospilota (Brandt, 1835)
  - Holothuria nobilis (Selenka, 1867)
  - Holothuria platei Ludwig, 1898
  - Holothuria pyxoides Ludwig, 1888
  - Holothuria scabra Jaeger, 1833
  - Holothuria whitmaei Bell, 1887
