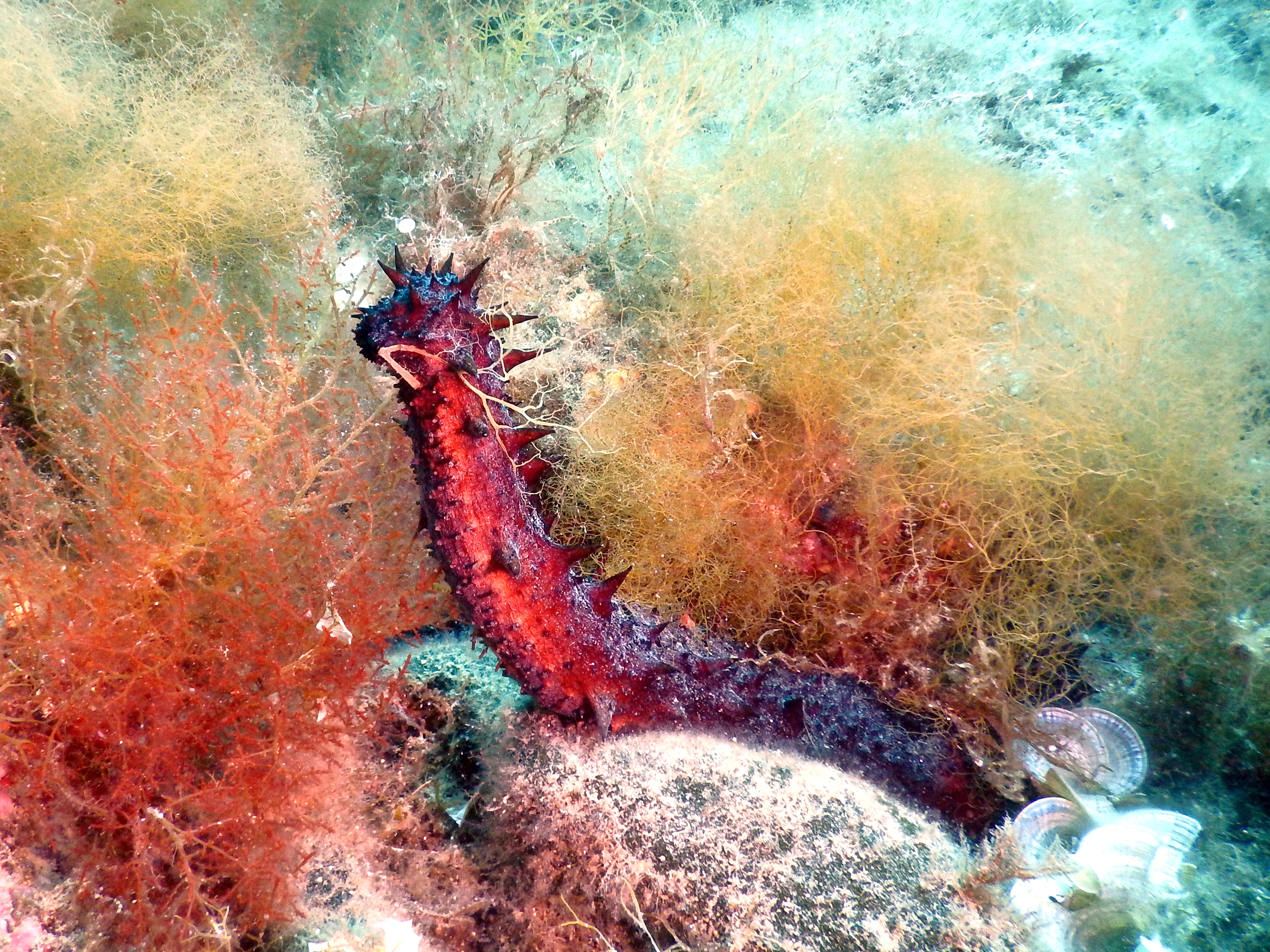

Conservation status
- Least Concern (IUCN 3.1)

Scientific classification
- Kingdom: Animalia
- Phylum: Echinodermata
- Class: Holothuroidea
- Order: Holothuriida
- Family: Holothuriidae
- Genus: Holothuria
- Species: H. tubulosa

Binomial name
- Holothuria tubulosa Gmelin, 1791

Synonyms
- H. cavolini delle Chiaje, 1824; H. columnae delle Chiaje, 1823, non Cuvier, 1817; H. columnae Cuvier, 1817; H. columnae de Blainville, 1821; H. maxima delle Chiaje, 1823; H. petagnae delle Chiaje, 1824; H. tremula Linnaeus, 1767

= Holothuria tubulosa =

Species of sea cucumber

Holothuria tubulosa, the cotton-spinner or tubular sea cucumber, is a species of sea cucumber in the family Holothuriidae. It is the type species of the genus Holothuria and is placed in the subgenus Holothuria, making its full name Holothuria (Holothuria) tubulosa.

== Description ==
Holothuria tubulosa grows to a length of between 20 centimetres (7.9 in) and 45 centimetres (18 in), and a diameter of 6 centimetres (2.4 in). It is roughly cylindrical with a flattened base on which there are three longitudinal rows of tube feet. It has a tough, leathery skin. The general colour is a shade of brown and the surface is covered with numerous dark-coloured, conical, thornlike projections known as papillae. It often appears greyish, as it secretes a protective film of mucus to which bits of seaweed and sediment may adhere. It has a fringe of short, flattened tentacles around the mouth at the anterior end and an anus at the posterior end.

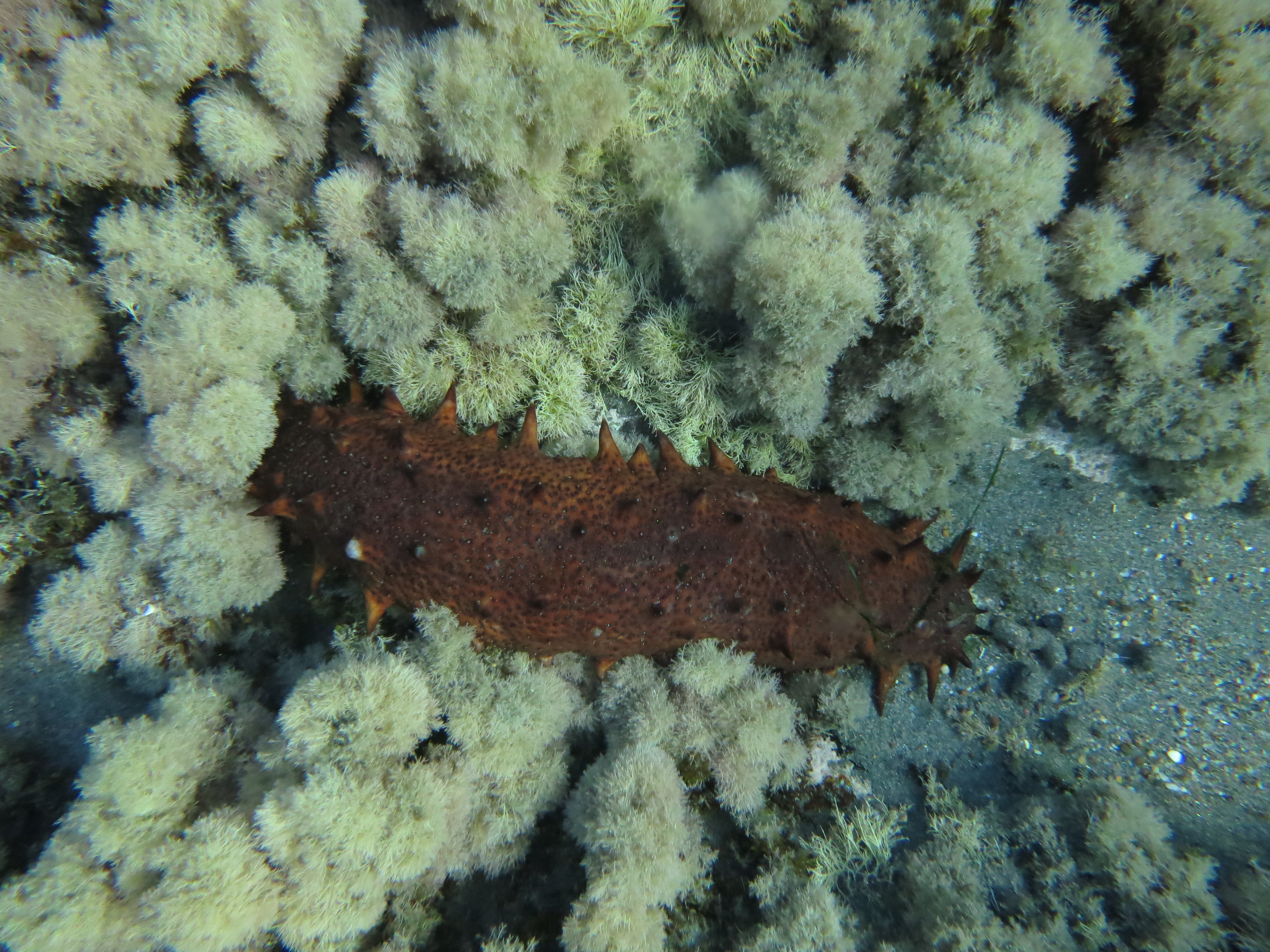

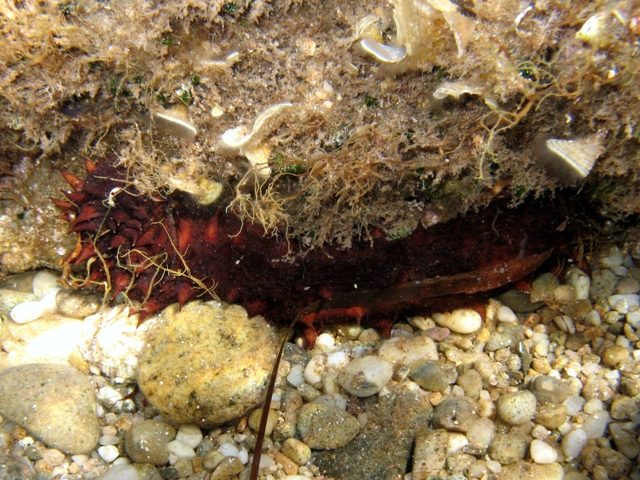

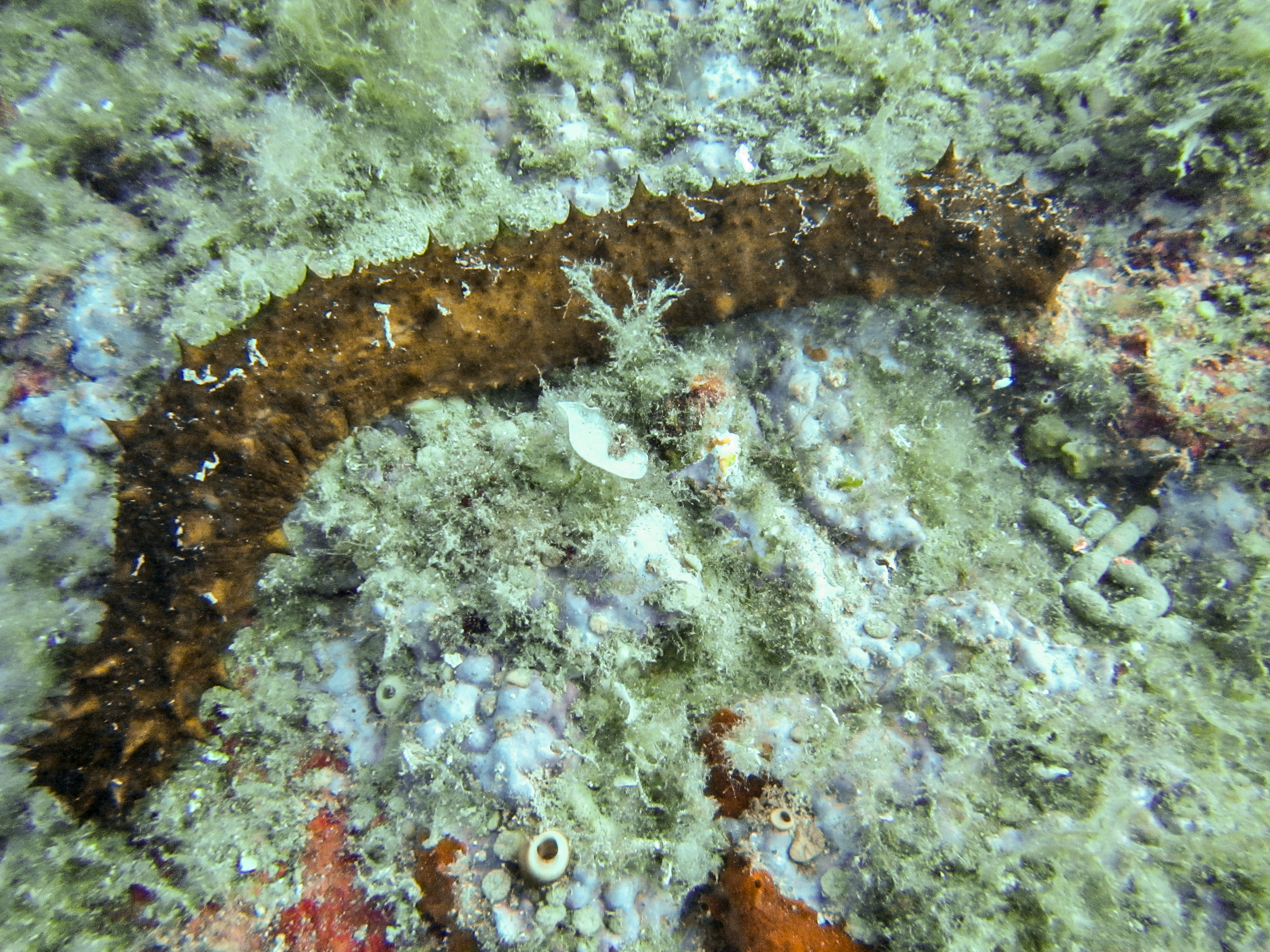

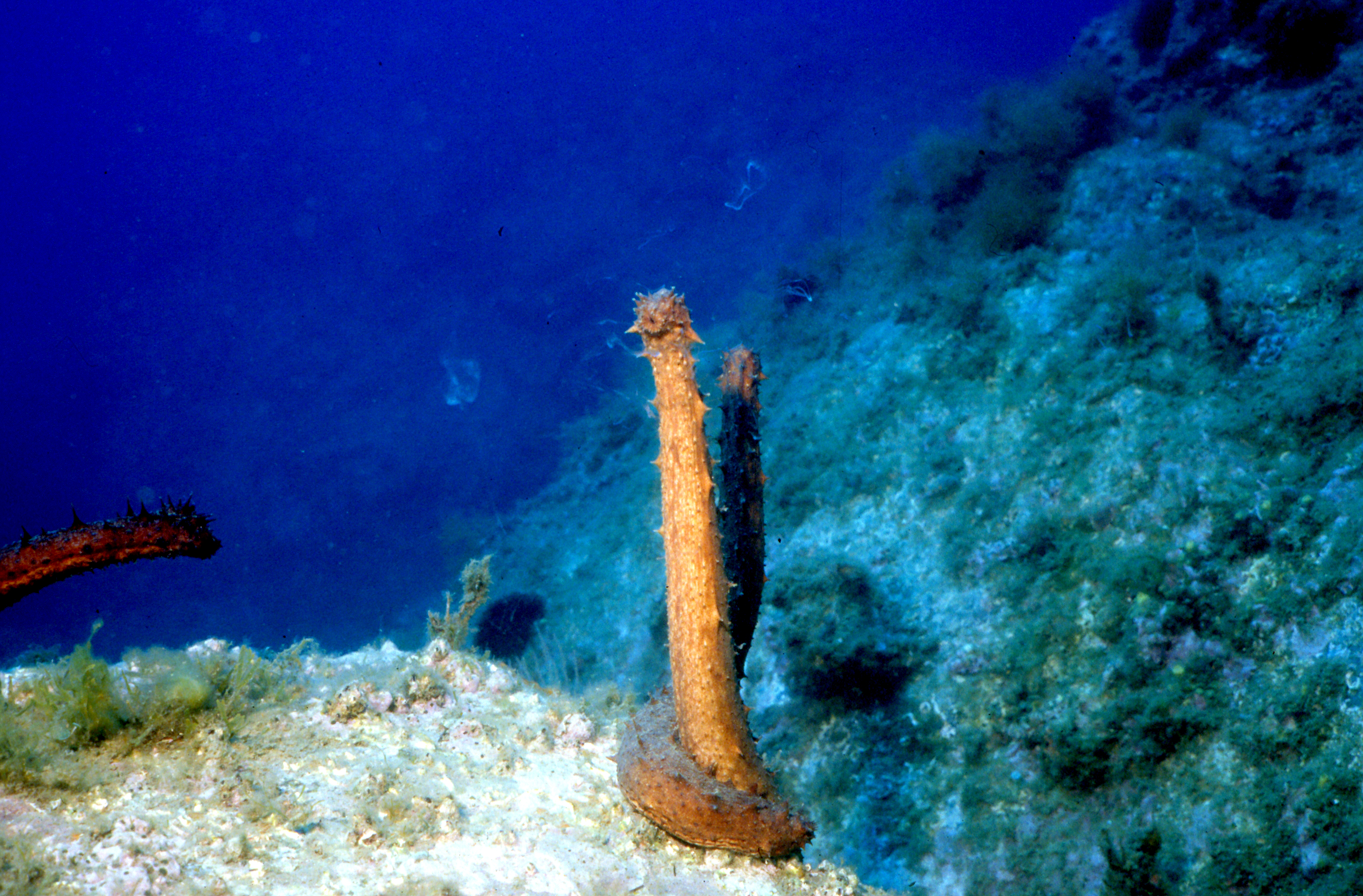

== Distribution and habitat ==
Holothuria tubulosa is found in temperate regions of the eastern Atlantic Ocean as far north as the Bay of Biscay and in the Mediterranean Sea, where it is abundant. It is found on sandy seabeds, among seagrass (Posidonia spp.) and on muddy rocks to a depth of about 100 metres (330 ft).

== Biology ==
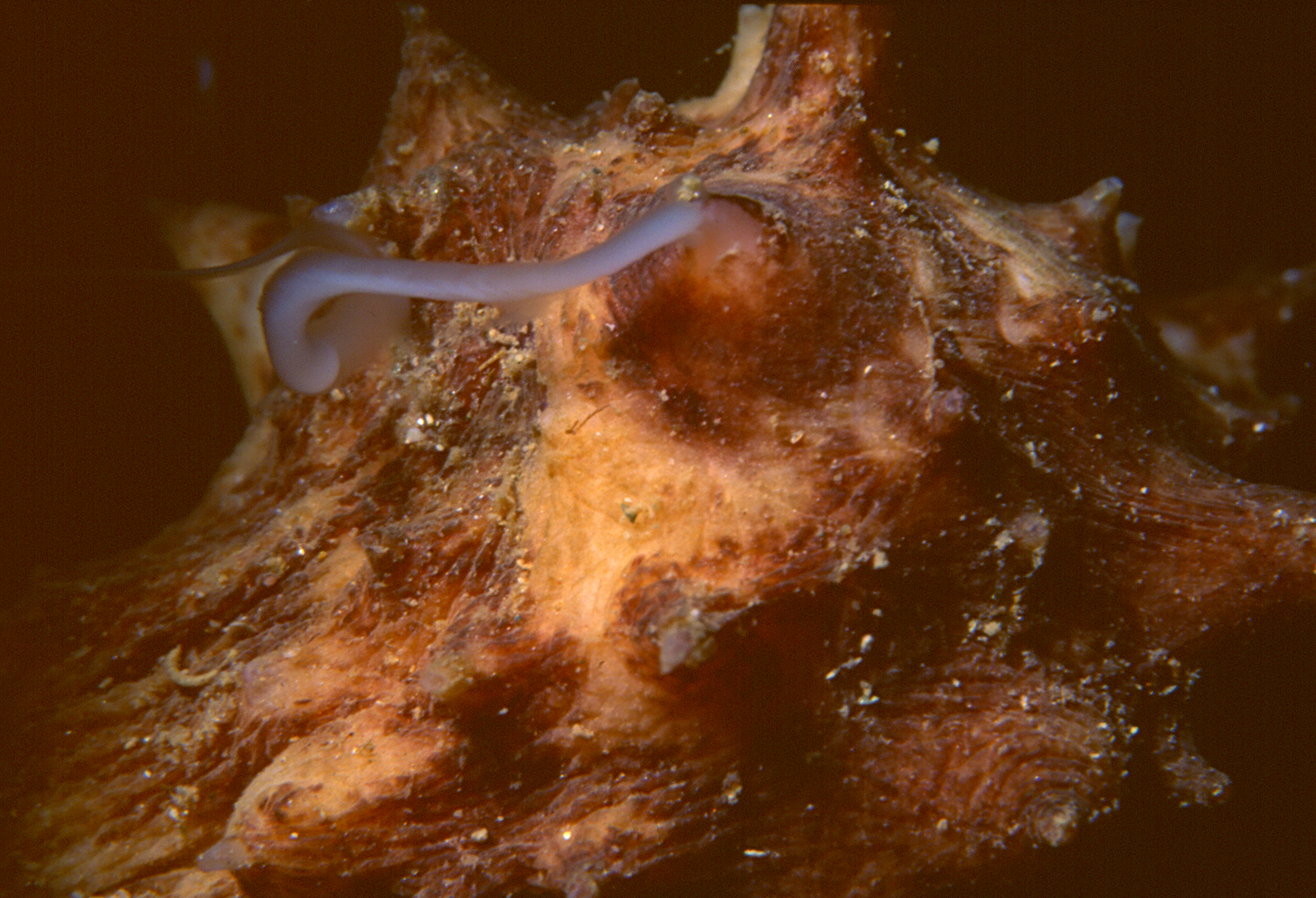
Male Holothuria tubulosa releasing sperm

Holothuria tubulosa feeds on detritus, algae and plankton. It uses its tube feet to move across the surface or adhere to rocks.

Holothuria tubulosa is dioecious, with each individual being either male or female but with no difference between them in external appearance. In a study in the Mediterranean Sea, a mass spawning event was observed in the afternoons of the two days in August 2003 that coincided with the full moon. Large numbers of mature individuals simultaneously adopted the spawning position, rearing their anterior ends up and leaving only the hind third of their body in contact with the seabed. This raises their genital orifices, situated just below the mouth, clear of the substrate to allow for maximum dispersal of the gametes. First, some individuals, believed to be males, emitted a whitish fluid which gradually dispersed in the surrounding water. Next, a smaller number of individuals, believed to be female, emitted a more viscous fluid, perhaps in response to the release of the male gametes. Each release lasted about 30 minutes. The necessary conditions for spawning seemed to be a full moon and a sea temperature of about 25 °C (77 °F).

The fertilised eggs hatch in about 24 hours and the developing larvae are planktonic. They feed on microscopic algae and pass through several stages over the course of a few weeks before settling on the seabed and undergoing metamorphosis into juveniles.

Along with Parastichopus regalis, Holothuria tubulosa is the preferred host of Carapus acus, which shares a commensal association with the sea cucumber.

== Uses ==
Sea cucumbers are used for food in some countries, particularly Taiwan, China, Singapore and Korea. There is a commercial fishery in Turkey and a closed season is imposed in August and September to allow the animals to spawn. Holothuria tubulosa is one of the species collected by divers, who can gather 2000 to 3000 in a day. The sea cucumbers are either sun dried, oven dried, or frozen before being exported. Sea cucumbers have high amounts of health benefits to humans, they provide high amounts of protein and fatty acids. They are mostly harvested in Southeast Asian countries where in the 1980s they became a popular resource to use in nutritional, biological, and pharmaceutical products. Holothuria tubulosa has been investigated as a new source for omega-3 and omega-6 fatty acids, and the production of bioactive peptides.
