= Euryparasitidae =

Scientific classification
- Kingdom: Animalia
- Phylum: Arthropoda
- Subphylum: Chelicerata
- Class: Arachnida
- Order: Mesostigmata
- Family: Euryparasitidae; L. M. M. K. d'Antony, 1987

Family of arachnids

Euryparasitidae is a family of mites in the order Mesostigmata.

== Genera and species ==
- Acugamasus D. C. Lee, 1970
  - Acugamasus plumitergus Karg, 1997
  - Acugamasus punctatus (Womersley, 1942)
  - Acugamasus tuberculatus Karg, 1993
- Allogamasellus Athias-Henriot, 1961
  - Allogamasellus aquafortensis Athias-Henriot, 1961
- Cyrtolaelaps Berlese, 1887
  - Cyrtolaelaps aster (Berlese, 1918)
  - Cyrtolaelaps berlessei Chelebiev, 1984
  - Cyrtolaelaps mucronatus (G. Canestrini & R. Canestrini, 1881)
  - Cyrtolaelaps paraster Costa, 1961
  - Cyrtolaelaps qinghaiensis Ma, 1988
  - Cyrtolaelaps subnudus (Berlese, 1918)
- Euryparasitus Oudemans, 1901
  - Euryparasitus calcarator (Banks, 1910)
  - Euryparasitus changanensis Gu & Huang, 1992
  - Euryparasitus citelli Bai, Chen & Gu, 1988
  - Euryparasitus davydovae Bondarchuk & Buyakova, 1978
  - Euryparasitus emarginatus (C. L. Koch, 1839)
  - Euryparasitus kasakstanicus Chelebiev, 1978
  - Euryparasitus laxiventralis Gu & Guo, 1995
  - Euryparasitus longicheta Bondarchuk & Buyakova, 1978
  - Euryparasitus pagumae Ishikawa, 1988
  - Euryparasitus taojiangensis Ma, 1982
- Heterogamasus Trägårdh, 1907
  - Heterogamasus calcarellus
- Notogamasellus Loots & Ryke, 1966
  - Notogamasellus vandenbergi Loots & Ryke, 1966
  - Notogamasellus magoebaensis Loots & Ryke, 1966
- Starkovia Lombardini, 1947
  - Starkovia termitophila Lombardini, 1947
