= Acugamasus montanus =

Scientific classification
- Domain: Eukaryota
- Kingdom: Animalia
- Phylum: Arthropoda
- Subphylum: Chelicerata
- Class: Arachnida
- Order: Mesostigmata
- Family: Ologamasidae
- Genus: Acugamasus
- Species: A. montanus

Binomial name
- Acugamasus montanus (Willmann, 1936)

Synonyms
- Gamasellus montanus (Willmann, 1936)

Species of mite

Acugamasus montanus is a species of mite in the family Ologamasidae. It is found in Europe.

This species was formerly in the genus Gamasellus.
