= Ologamasus microcrinis =

Scientific classification
- Domain: Eukaryota
- Kingdom: Animalia
- Phylum: Arthropoda
- Subphylum: Chelicerata
- Class: Arachnida
- Order: Mesostigmata
- Family: Ologamasidae
- Genus: Ologamasus
- Species: O. microcrinis

Binomial name
- Ologamasus microcrinis (Karg, 1979)

Synonyms
- Hydrogamasellus microcrinis Karg, 1979

Species of mite

Ologamasus microcrinis is a species of mite in the family Ologamasidae.

This species was formerly a member of the genus Hydrogamasellus.
