= Cyrtolaelaps iphidiformis =

Scientific classification
- Domain: Eukaryota
- Kingdom: Animalia
- Phylum: Arthropoda
- Subphylum: Chelicerata
- Class: Arachnida
- Order: Mesostigmata
- Family: Ologamasidae
- Genus: Cyrtolaelaps
- Species: C. iphidiformis

Binomial name
- Cyrtolaelaps iphidiformis (Berlese, 1904)

Synonyms
- Gamasellus iphidiformis (Berlese, 1904)

Species of mite

Cyrtolaelaps iphidiformis is a species of mite in the family Ologamasidae.

This species was formerly a member of the genus Gamasellus.
