= Gamasellus virguncula =

Scientific classification
- Domain: Eukaryota
- Kingdom: Animalia
- Phylum: Arthropoda
- Subphylum: Chelicerata
- Class: Arachnida
- Order: Mesostigmata
- Family: Ologamasidae
- Genus: Gamasellus
- Species: G. virguncula

Binomial name
- Gamasellus virguncula (Lee, 1973)

Synonyms
- Onchogamasus virguncula Lee, 1973

Species of mite

Gamasellus virguncula is a species of mite in the family Ologamasidae.

This species was formerly a member of the genus Onchogamasus.
