= Acugamasus nepotulus =

Scientific classification
- Domain: Eukaryota
- Kingdom: Animalia
- Phylum: Arthropoda
- Subphylum: Chelicerata
- Class: Arachnida
- Order: Mesostigmata
- Family: Ologamasidae
- Genus: Acugamasus
- Species: A. nepotulus

Binomial name
- Acugamasus nepotulus (Berlese, 1908)

Synonyms
- Gamasellus nepotulus Berlese, 1908

Species of mite

Acugamasus nepotulus is a species of mite in the family Ologamasidae.

This species was formerly in the genus Gamasellus.
