= Neogamasellevans brevisetosa =

Scientific classification
- Domain: Eukaryota
- Kingdom: Animalia
- Phylum: Arthropoda
- Subphylum: Chelicerata
- Class: Arachnida
- Order: Mesostigmata
- Family: Ologamasidae
- Genus: Neogamasellevans
- Species: N. brevisetosa

Binomial name
- Neogamasellevans brevisetosa Karg, 1997

Species of mite

Neogamasellevans brevisetosa is a species of mite in the family Ologamasidae.
