= Pilellus =

Scientific classification
- Domain: Eukaryota
- Kingdom: Animalia
- Phylum: Arthropoda
- Subphylum: Chelicerata
- Class: Arachnida
- Order: Mesostigmata
- Superfamily: Rhodacaroidea
- Family: Ologamasidae
- Genus: Pilellus; Lee, 1970

Genus of mites

Pilellus is a genus of mites in the family Ologamasidae. There are at least two described species in Pilellus.

== Species ==
These two species belong to the genus Pilellus:

- Pilellus rugipellis Lee & Hunter, 1974
- Pilellus rykei (Hunter, 1967)
