= Pachymasiphis maior =

Scientific classification
- Domain: Eukaryota
- Kingdom: Animalia
- Phylum: Arthropoda
- Subphylum: Chelicerata
- Class: Arachnida
- Order: Mesostigmata
- Family: Ologamasidae
- Genus: Pachymasiphis
- Species: P. maior

Binomial name
- Pachymasiphis maior Karg, 1996

Species of mite

Pachymasiphis maior is a species of mite in the family Ologamasidae.
