= Geogamasus fornix =

Scientific classification
- Domain: Eukaryota
- Kingdom: Animalia
- Phylum: Arthropoda
- Subphylum: Chelicerata
- Class: Arachnida
- Order: Mesostigmata
- Family: Ologamasidae
- Genus: Geogamasus
- Species: G. fornix

Binomial name
- Geogamasus fornix Halliday, 2001

Species of mite

Geogamasus fornix is a species of mite in the family Ologamasidae.
