= Gamasellopsis curtipilus =

Scientific classification
- Domain: Eukaryota
- Kingdom: Animalia
- Phylum: Arthropoda
- Subphylum: Chelicerata
- Class: Arachnida
- Order: Mesostigmata
- Family: Ologamasidae
- Genus: Gamasellopsis
- Species: G. curtipilus

Binomial name
- Gamasellopsis curtipilus Loots e Ryke, 1966

Species of mite

Gamasellopsis curtipilus is a species of mite in the family Ologamasidae.
