= Periseius =

Scientific classification
- Domain: Eukaryota
- Kingdom: Animalia
- Phylum: Arthropoda
- Subphylum: Chelicerata
- Class: Arachnida
- Order: Mesostigmata
- Superfamily: Rhodacaroidea
- Family: Ologamasidae
- Genus: Periseius; Womersley, 1961

Genus of mites

Periseius is a genus of mites in the family Ologamasidae. There are about five described species in Periseius.

== Species ==
These five species belong to the genus Periseius:

- Periseius brasiliensis Hirschmann, 1966
- Periseius hammeni (Womersley, 1961)
- Periseius nobskae (Haq, 1965)
- Periseius plumosus Karg, 1994
- Periseius schusteri Hirschmann, 1966
