= Cymiphis cymosus =

Scientific classification
- Kingdom: Animalia
- Phylum: Arthropoda
- Subphylum: Chelicerata
- Class: Arachnida
- Order: Mesostigmata
- Family: Ologamasidae
- Genus: Cymiphis
- Species: C. cymosus

Binomial name
- Cymiphis cymosus (Lee, 1966)

Species of mite

Cymiphis cymosus is a species of mite in the family Ologamasidae.
