= Hydrogamasellus antarcticus =

Scientific classification
- Domain: Eukaryota
- Kingdom: Animalia
- Phylum: Arthropoda
- Subphylum: Chelicerata
- Class: Arachnida
- Order: Mesostigmata
- Family: Ologamasidae
- Genus: Hydrogamasellus
- Species: H. antarcticus

Binomial name
- Hydrogamasellus antarcticus (Tragardh, 1907)

Species of mite

Hydrogamasellus antarcticus is a species of mite in the family Ologamasidae.
