= Ologamasus cananeiae =

Scientific classification
- Domain: Eukaryota
- Kingdom: Animalia
- Phylum: Arthropoda
- Subphylum: Chelicerata
- Class: Arachnida
- Order: Mesostigmata
- Family: Ologamasidae
- Genus: Ologamasus
- Species: O. cananeiae

Binomial name
- Ologamasus cananeiae Silva, Moraes & Krantz, 2007

Species of mite

Ologamasus cananeiae is a species of mite in the family Ologamasidae.
