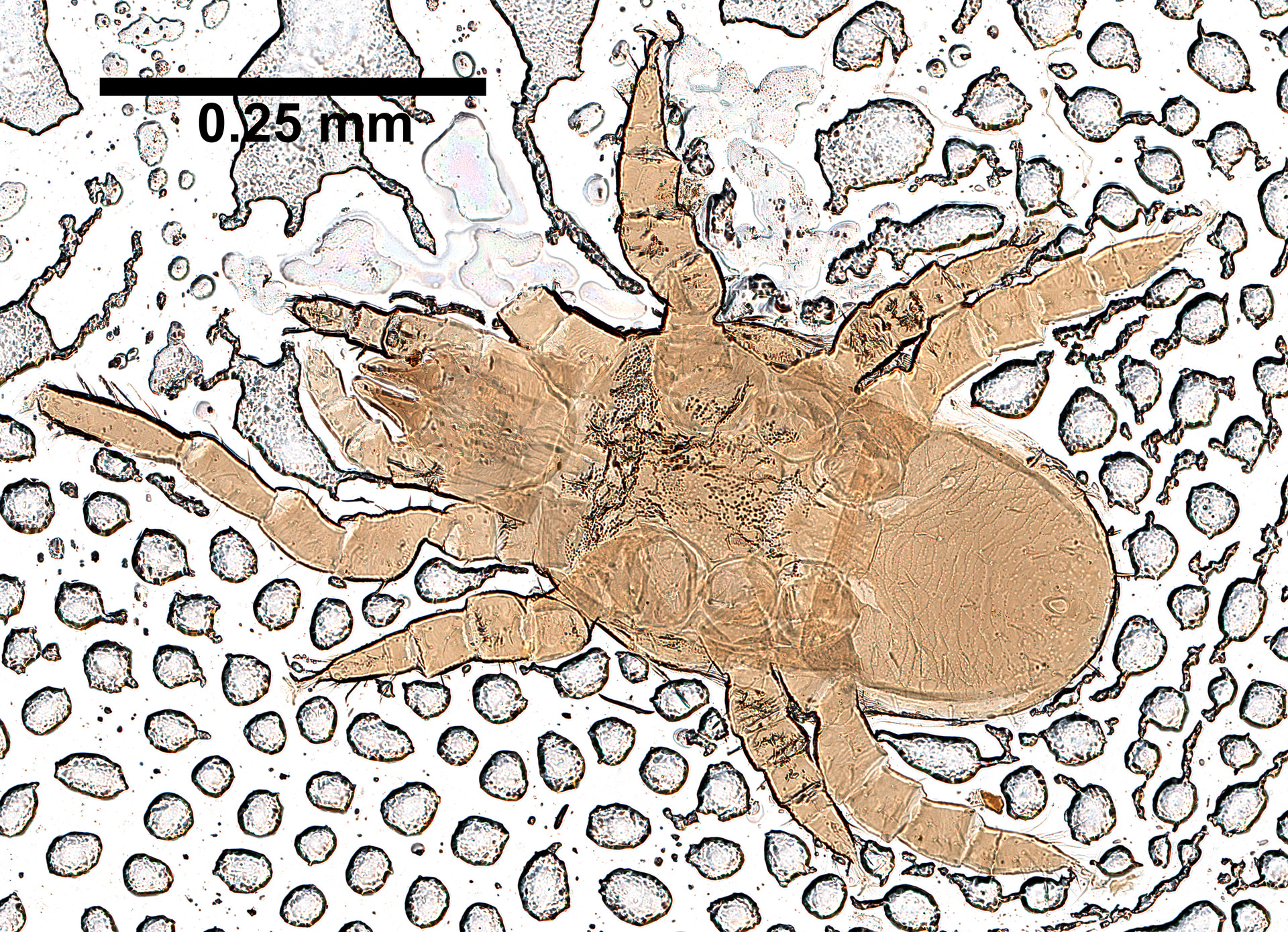
- Psammonsella nobskae

Scientific classification
- Kingdom: Animalia
- Phylum: Arthropoda
- Subphylum: Chelicerata
- Class: Arachnida
- Order: Mesostigmata
- Family: Ologamasidae
- Genus: Psammonsella; Haq, 1965

= Psammonsella =

Genus of mites

Psammonsella is a genus of mites in the family Ologamasidae.

== Species ==
- Psammonsella nobskae Haq, 1965
