= Euepicrius caesariatus =

Scientific classification
- Domain: Eukaryota
- Kingdom: Animalia
- Phylum: Arthropoda
- Subphylum: Chelicerata
- Class: Arachnida
- Order: Mesostigmata
- Family: Ologamasidae
- Genus: Euepicrius
- Species: E. caesariatus

Binomial name
- Euepicrius caesariatus Lee e Hunter, 1974

Species of mite

Euepicrius caesariatus is a species of mite in the family Ologamasidae.
