= Lobocephalus =

Scientific classification
- Kingdom: Animalia
- Phylum: Arthropoda
- Subphylum: Chelicerata
- Class: Arachnida
- Order: Mesostigmata
- Family: Ologamasidae
- Genus: Lobocephalus; Kramer, 1898

Genus of mites

Lobocephalus is a genus of mites in the family Ologamasidae.

== Species ==
- Lobocephalus acuminatus Kramer, 1898
