= Heydeniella womersleyi =

Scientific classification
- Domain: Eukaryota
- Kingdom: Animalia
- Phylum: Arthropoda
- Subphylum: Chelicerata
- Class: Arachnida
- Order: Mesostigmata
- Family: Ologamasidae
- Genus: Heydeniella
- Species: H. womersleyi

Binomial name
- Heydeniella womersleyi Lee & Hunter, 1974

Species of mite

Heydeniella womersleyi is a species of mite in the family Ologamasidae.
