= Neogamasellevans preendopodalis =

Scientific classification
- Domain: Eukaryota
- Kingdom: Animalia
- Phylum: Arthropoda
- Subphylum: Chelicerata
- Class: Arachnida
- Order: Mesostigmata
- Family: Ologamasidae
- Genus: Neogamasellevans
- Species: N. preendopodalis

Binomial name
- Neogamasellevans preendopodalis Loots & Ryke, 1967

Species of mite

Neogamasellevans preendopodalis is a species of mite in the family Ologamasidae.
