= Caliphis eugenitalis =

Scientific classification
- Domain: Eukaryota
- Kingdom: Animalia
- Phylum: Arthropoda
- Subphylum: Chelicerata
- Class: Arachnida
- Order: Mesostigmata
- Family: Ologamasidae
- Genus: Caliphis
- Species: C. eugenitalis

Binomial name
- Caliphis eugenitalis Karg, 1993

Species of mite

Caliphis eugenitalis is a species of mite in the family Ologamasidae.
