= Onchogamasus quasicurtipilus =

Scientific classification
- Domain: Eukaryota
- Kingdom: Animalia
- Phylum: Arthropoda
- Subphylum: Chelicerata
- Class: Arachnida
- Order: Mesostigmata
- Family: Ologamasidae
- Genus: Onchogamasus
- Species: O. quasicurtipilus

Binomial name
- Onchogamasus quasicurtipilus Lee, 1970

Species of mite

Onchogamasus quasicurtipilus is a species of mite in the family Ologamasidae.
