= Gamasellus morogoroensis =

Scientific classification
- Domain: Eukaryota
- Kingdom: Animalia
- Phylum: Arthropoda
- Subphylum: Chelicerata
- Class: Arachnida
- Order: Mesostigmata
- Family: Ologamasidae
- Genus: Gamasellus
- Species: G. morogoroensis

Binomial name
- Gamasellus morogoroensis Hurlbutt, 1979

Species of mite

Gamasellus morogoroensis is a species of mite in the family Ologamasidae.
