= Geogamasus skoshi =

Scientific classification
- Domain: Eukaryota
- Kingdom: Animalia
- Phylum: Arthropoda
- Subphylum: Chelicerata
- Class: Arachnida
- Order: Mesostigmata
- Family: Ologamasidae
- Genus: Geogamasus
- Species: G. skoshi

Binomial name
- Geogamasus skoshi Lee, 1970

Species of mite

Geogamasus skoshi is a species of mite in the family Ologamasidae.
