= Sessiluncus femoralis =

Scientific classification
- Domain: Eukaryota
- Kingdom: Animalia
- Phylum: Arthropoda
- Subphylum: Chelicerata
- Class: Arachnida
- Order: Mesostigmata
- Family: Ologamasidae
- Genus: Sessiluncus
- Species: S. femoralis

Binomial name
- Sessiluncus femoralis Bhattacharyya, 1977

Species of mite

Sessiluncus femoralis is a species of mite in the family Ologamasidae.
