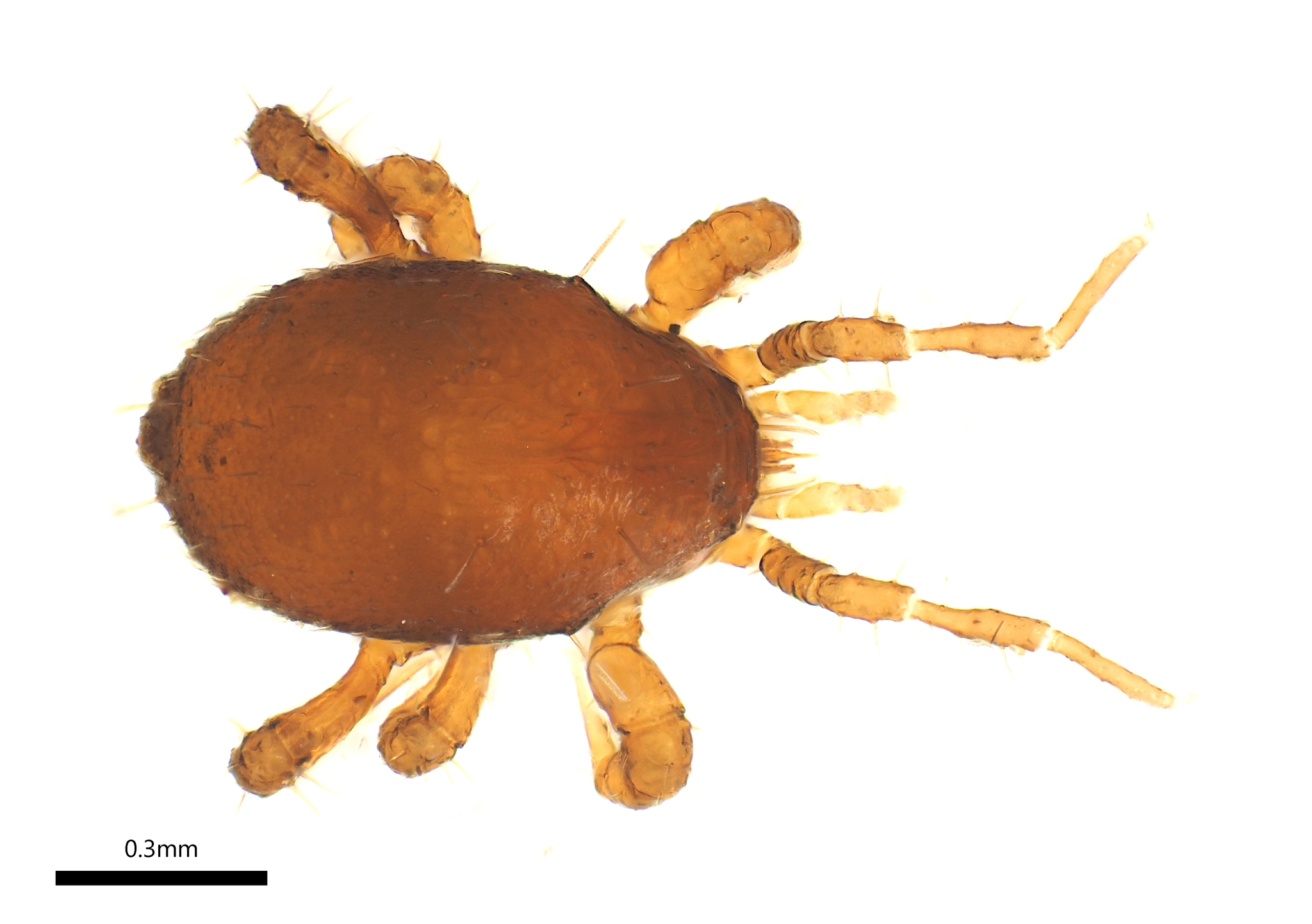

Scientific classification
- Kingdom: Animalia
- Phylum: Arthropoda
- Subphylum: Chelicerata
- Class: Arachnida
- Order: Mesostigmata
- Infraorder: Gamasina
- Superfamily: Rhodacaroidea
- Family: Ologamasidae
- Genus: Pyriphis; Lee, 1970
- Species: P. pyrenoides

Binomial name
- Pyriphis pyrenoides (Lee, 1966)

= Pyriphis =

Genus of mites

Pyriphis is a genus of mites in the family Ologamasidae.

== Species ==
- Pyriphis pyrenoides (Lee, 1966)
