= Hydrogamasellus calculus =

Scientific classification
- Domain: Eukaryota
- Kingdom: Animalia
- Phylum: Arthropoda
- Subphylum: Chelicerata
- Class: Arachnida
- Order: Mesostigmata
- Family: Ologamasidae
- Genus: Hydrogamasellus
- Species: H. calculus

Binomial name
- Hydrogamasellus calculus Karg, 1997

Species of mite

Hydrogamasellus calculus is a species of mite in the family Ologamasidae.
