= Calidus =

Calidus is Latin meaning fiery, spirited or rash. It can refer to:

== Aircraft ==
- AutoGyro Calidus, a German autogyro design
- RotorSport UK Calidus, a British autogyro design

== Animals ==
- Barbus calidus, a ray-finned fish species in the family Cyprinidae, commonly called the Clanwilliam Redfin
- Dardanus calidus, a species of hermit crab
- Falco peregrinus calidus, a species of Peregrine Falcon
- Rhodacaroides calidus, a mite in the family Ologamasidae
