= Caliphis calvus =

Scientific classification
- Domain: Eukaryota
- Kingdom: Animalia
- Phylum: Arthropoda
- Subphylum: Chelicerata
- Class: Arachnida
- Order: Mesostigmata
- Family: Ologamasidae
- Genus: Caliphis
- Species: C. calvus

Binomial name
- Caliphis calvus Lee, 1970

Species of mite

Caliphis calvus is a species of mite in the family Ologamasidae.
