= Ologamasus longisetosus =

Scientific classification
- Domain: Eukaryota
- Kingdom: Animalia
- Phylum: Arthropoda
- Subphylum: Chelicerata
- Class: Arachnida
- Order: Mesostigmata
- Family: Ologamasidae
- Genus: Ologamasus
- Species: O. longisetosus

Binomial name
- Ologamasus longisetosus Schmolzer, 1995

Species of mite

Ologamasus longisetosus is a species of mite in the genus Ologamasus.
