= Laelaptiella anomala =

Scientific classification
- Domain: Eukaryota
- Kingdom: Animalia
- Phylum: Arthropoda
- Subphylum: Chelicerata
- Class: Arachnida
- Order: Mesostigmata
- Family: Ologamasidae
- Genus: Laelaptiella
- Species: L. anomala

Binomial name
- Laelaptiella anomala Womersley, 1956

Species of mite

Laelaptiella anomala is a species of mite in the family Ologamasidae.
