= Gamasellus vibrissatus =

Scientific classification
- Domain: Eukaryota
- Kingdom: Animalia
- Phylum: Arthropoda
- Subphylum: Chelicerata
- Class: Arachnida
- Order: Mesostigmata
- Family: Ologamasidae
- Genus: Gamasellus
- Species: G. vibrissatus

Binomial name
- Gamasellus vibrissatus Emberson, 1967

Species of mite

Gamasellus vibrissatus is a species of mite in the family Ologamasidae.
