= Gamasellevans epigynialis =

Scientific classification
- Domain: Eukaryota
- Kingdom: Animalia
- Phylum: Arthropoda
- Subphylum: Chelicerata
- Class: Arachnida
- Order: Mesostigmata
- Family: Ologamasidae
- Genus: Gamasellevans
- Species: G. epigynialis

Binomial name
- Gamasellevans epigynialis Loots e Ryke, 1967

Species of mite

Gamasellevans epigynialis is a species of mite in the family Ologamasidae.
