= Sessiluncus =

Scientific classification
- Domain: Eukaryota
- Kingdom: Animalia
- Phylum: Arthropoda
- Subphylum: Chelicerata
- Class: Arachnida
- Order: Mesostigmata
- Superfamily: Rhodacaroidea
- Family: Ologamasidae
- Genus: Sessiluncus; Canestrini, 1898

Genus of mites

Sessiluncus is a genus of mites in the family Ologamasidae. There are about 14 described species in Sessiluncus.

== Species ==
These 14 species belong to the genus Sessiluncus:

- Sessiluncus abalaae Datta & Bhattacharjee, 1991
- Sessiluncus aegypticus Nasr & Afifi, 1984
- Sessiluncus bengalensis Bhattacharyya, 1977
- Sessiluncus calcuttaensis Bhattacharyya, 1977
- Sessiluncus cavensis Willmann, 1940
- Sessiluncus colchicus Bregetova, 1977
- Sessiluncus femoralis Bhattacharyya, 1977
- Sessiluncus heterotarsus (Canestrini, 1897)
- Sessiluncus holostaspoides Canestrini, 1884
- Sessiluncus hungaricus Karg, 1964
- Sessiluncus indicus Bhattacharyya, 1977
- Sessiluncus leei Datta & Bhattacharjee, 1991
- Sessiluncus oculatus Vitzthum, 1935
- Sessiluncus reticulatus Loots, 1980
