= Litogamasus setosus =

Scientific classification
- Domain: Eukaryota
- Kingdom: Animalia
- Phylum: Arthropoda
- Subphylum: Chelicerata
- Class: Arachnida
- Order: Mesostigmata
- Family: Ologamasidae
- Genus: Litogamasus
- Species: L. setosus

Binomial name
- Litogamasus setosus (Kramer, 1898)

Species of mite

Litogamasus setosus is a species of mite in the family Ologamasidae.
