= Parasitiphis littoralis =

Scientific classification
- Domain: Eukaryota
- Kingdom: Animalia
- Phylum: Arthropoda
- Subphylum: Chelicerata
- Class: Arachnida
- Order: Mesostigmata
- Family: Ologamasidae
- Genus: Parasitiphis
- Species: P. littoralis

Binomial name
- Parasitiphis littoralis Womersley, 1956

Species of mite

Parasitiphis littoralis is a species of mite in the family Ologamasidae.
