= Pilellus rykei =

Scientific classification
- Domain: Eukaryota
- Kingdom: Animalia
- Phylum: Arthropoda
- Subphylum: Chelicerata
- Class: Arachnida
- Order: Mesostigmata
- Family: Ologamasidae
- Genus: Pilellus
- Species: P. rykei

Binomial name
- Pilellus rykei (Hunter, 1967)

Species of mite

Pilellus rykei is a species of mite in the family Ologamasidae.
