= Euepicrius bipeltatus =

Scientific classification
- Domain: Eukaryota
- Kingdom: Animalia
- Phylum: Arthropoda
- Subphylum: Chelicerata
- Class: Arachnida
- Order: Mesostigmata
- Family: Ologamasidae
- Genus: Euepicrius
- Species: E. bipeltatus

Binomial name
- Euepicrius bipeltatus Karg, 1997

Species of mite

Euepicrius bipeltatus is a species of mite in the family Ologamasidae.
