= Antennolaelaps affinis =

Scientific classification
- Kingdom: Animalia
- Phylum: Arthropoda
- Subphylum: Chelicerata
- Class: Arachnida
- Order: Mesostigmata
- Family: Ologamasidae
- Genus: Antennolaelaps
- Species: A. affinis

Binomial name
- Antennolaelaps affinis Womersley, 1956

Species of mite

Antennolaelaps affinis is a species of mite in the family Ologamasidae, first described by Herbert Womersley in 1956.
