= Antennolaelaps aremenae =

Scientific classification
- Domain: Eukaryota
- Kingdom: Animalia
- Phylum: Arthropoda
- Subphylum: Chelicerata
- Class: Arachnida
- Order: Mesostigmata
- Family: Ologamasidae
- Genus: Antennolaelaps
- Species: A. aremenae

Binomial name
- Antennolaelaps aremenae Lee, 1973

Species of mite

Antennolaelaps aremenae is a species of mite in the family Ologamasidae.
