= Periseius plumosus =

Scientific classification
- Domain: Eukaryota
- Kingdom: Animalia
- Phylum: Arthropoda
- Subphylum: Chelicerata
- Class: Arachnida
- Order: Mesostigmata
- Family: Ologamasidae
- Genus: Periseius
- Species: P. plumosus

Binomial name
- Periseius plumosus Karg, 1994

Species of mite

Periseius plumosus is a species of mite in the family Ologamasidae.
