= Athiasella relicta =

Scientific classification
- Domain: Eukaryota
- Kingdom: Animalia
- Phylum: Arthropoda
- Subphylum: Chelicerata
- Class: Arachnida
- Order: Mesostigmata
- Family: Ologamasidae
- Genus: Athiasella
- Species: A. relicta

Binomial name
- Athiasella relicta (Womersley, 1942)

Species of mite

Athiasella relicta is a species of mite in the family Ologamasidae.

== Subspecies ==
These two subspecies belong to the species Athiasella relicta:

- Athiasella relicta major (Womersley, 1942)
- Athiasella relicta relicta
