= Laelaptiella eupodalia =

Scientific classification
- Domain: Eukaryota
- Kingdom: Animalia
- Phylum: Arthropoda
- Subphylum: Chelicerata
- Class: Arachnida
- Order: Mesostigmata
- Family: Ologamasidae
- Genus: Laelaptiella
- Species: L. eupodalia

Binomial name
- Laelaptiella eupodalia Karg, 1996

Species of mite

Laelaptiella eupodalia is a species of mite in the family Ologamasidae.
