= Rykellus =

Scientific classification
- Domain: Eukaryota
- Kingdom: Animalia
- Phylum: Arthropoda
- Subphylum: Chelicerata
- Class: Arachnida
- Order: Mesostigmata
- Superfamily: Rhodacaroidea
- Family: Ologamasidae
- Genus: Rykellus; Lee, 1970

Genus of mites

Rykellus is a genus of mites in the family Ologamasidae. There are at least three described species in Rykellus.

== Species ==
These three species belong to the genus Rykellus:

- Rykellus brevipellitus Karg & Schorlemmer, 2009
- Rykellus darglensis (Ryke, 1962)
- Rykellus nkandhlaensis (Ryke, 1962)
