= Euepicrius femuralis =

Scientific classification
- Domain: Eukaryota
- Kingdom: Animalia
- Phylum: Arthropoda
- Subphylum: Chelicerata
- Class: Arachnida
- Order: Mesostigmata
- Family: Ologamasidae
- Genus: Euepicrius
- Species: E. femuralis

Binomial name
- Euepicrius femuralis Karg, 1993

Species of mite

Euepicrius femuralis is a species of mite in the family Ologamasidae.
