= Hiniphis hinnus =

Scientific classification
- Domain: Eukaryota
- Kingdom: Animalia
- Phylum: Arthropoda
- Subphylum: Chelicerata
- Class: Arachnida
- Order: Mesostigmata
- Family: Ologamasidae
- Genus: Hiniphis
- Species: H. hinnus

Binomial name
- Hiniphis hinnus Lee, 1970

Species of mite

Hiniphis hinnus is a species of mite in the family Ologamasidae.
