= Euepicrius filamentosus =

Scientific classification
- Domain: Eukaryota
- Kingdom: Animalia
- Phylum: Arthropoda
- Subphylum: Chelicerata
- Class: Arachnida
- Order: Mesostigmata
- Family: Ologamasidae
- Genus: Euepicrius
- Species: E. filamentosus

Binomial name
- Euepicrius filamentosus Womersley, 1942

Species of mite

Euepicrius filamentosus is a species of mite in the family Ologamasidae.
