= Gamaselliphis potchefstroomensis =

Scientific classification
- Domain: Eukaryota
- Kingdom: Animalia
- Phylum: Arthropoda
- Subphylum: Chelicerata
- Class: Arachnida
- Order: Mesostigmata
- Family: Ologamasidae
- Genus: Gamaselliphis
- Species: G. potchefstroomensis

Binomial name
- Gamaselliphis potchefstroomensis (Ryke, 1961)

Species of mite

Gamaselliphis potchefstroomensis is a species of mite in the family Ologamasidae.
