= Euepicrius lootsi =

Scientific classification
- Domain: Eukaryota
- Kingdom: Animalia
- Phylum: Arthropoda
- Subphylum: Chelicerata
- Class: Arachnida
- Order: Mesostigmata
- Family: Ologamasidae
- Genus: Euepicrius
- Species: E. lootsi

Binomial name
- Euepicrius lootsi Lee, 1970

Species of mite

Euepicrius lootsi is a species of mite in the family Ologamasidae.
