= Evanssellus foliatus =

Scientific classification
- Domain: Eukaryota
- Kingdom: Animalia
- Phylum: Arthropoda
- Subphylum: Chelicerata
- Class: Arachnida
- Order: Mesostigmata
- Family: Ologamasidae
- Genus: Evanssellus
- Species: E. foliatus

Binomial name
- Evanssellus foliatus Ryke, 1961

Species of mite

Evanssellus foliatus is a species of mite in the family Ologamasidae.
