= Antennolaelaps alveolaris =

Scientific classification
- Domain: Eukaryota
- Kingdom: Animalia
- Phylum: Arthropoda
- Subphylum: Chelicerata
- Class: Arachnida
- Order: Mesostigmata
- Family: Ologamasidae
- Genus: Antennolaelaps
- Species: A. alveolaris

Binomial name
- Antennolaelaps alveolaris Karg, 1993

Species of mite

Antennolaelaps alveolaris is a species of mite in the family Ologamasidae.
