= Desectophis magnosimilis =

Scientific classification
- Domain: Eukaryota
- Kingdom: Animalia
- Phylum: Arthropoda
- Subphylum: Chelicerata
- Class: Arachnida
- Order: Mesostigmata
- Family: Ologamasidae
- Genus: Desectophis
- Species: D. magnosimilis

Binomial name
- Desectophis magnosimilis Karg, 2003

Species of mite

Desectophis magnosimilis is a species of mite in the family Ologamasidae.
