= Athiasella caverna =

Scientific classification
- Domain: Eukaryota
- Kingdom: Animalia
- Phylum: Arthropoda
- Subphylum: Chelicerata
- Class: Arachnida
- Order: Mesostigmata
- Family: Ologamasidae
- Genus: Athiasella
- Species: A. caverna

Binomial name
- Athiasella caverna Halliday, 2001

Species of mite

Athiasella caverna is a species of mite in the family Ologamasidae.
