= Notogamasellus vandenbergi =

Scientific classification
- Domain: Eukaryota
- Kingdom: Animalia
- Phylum: Arthropoda
- Subphylum: Chelicerata
- Class: Arachnida
- Order: Mesostigmata
- Family: Ologamasidae
- Genus: Notogamasellus
- Species: N. vandenbergi

Binomial name
- Notogamasellus vandenbergi Loots & Ryke, 1965

Species of mite

Notogamasellus vandenbergi is a species of mite in the family Ologamasidae.
