= Acuphis octornatus =

Scientific classification
- Domain: Eukaryota
- Kingdom: Animalia
- Phylum: Arthropoda
- Subphylum: Chelicerata
- Class: Arachnida
- Order: Mesostigmata
- Family: Ologamasidae
- Genus: Acuphis
- Species: A. octornatus

Binomial name
- Acuphis octornatus Karg, 1998

Species of mite

Acuphis octornatus is a species of mite in the family Ologamasidae.
