= Athiasella hami =

Scientific classification
- Domain: Eukaryota
- Kingdom: Animalia
- Phylum: Arthropoda
- Subphylum: Chelicerata
- Class: Arachnida
- Order: Mesostigmata
- Family: Ologamasidae
- Genus: Athiasella
- Species: A. hami

Binomial name
- Athiasella hami Karg, 1993

Species of mite

Athiasella hami is a species of mite in the family Ologamasidae.
