= Rhodacaroides crinitus =

Scientific classification
- Domain: Eukaryota
- Kingdom: Animalia
- Phylum: Arthropoda
- Subphylum: Chelicerata
- Class: Arachnida
- Order: Mesostigmata
- Family: Ologamasidae
- Genus: Rhodacaroides
- Species: R. crinitus

Binomial name
- Rhodacaroides crinitus Karg, 1979

Species of mite

Rhodacaroides crinitus is a species of mite in the family Ologamasidae.
