= Sessiluncus heterotarsus =

Scientific classification
- Domain: Eukaryota
- Kingdom: Animalia
- Phylum: Arthropoda
- Subphylum: Chelicerata
- Class: Arachnida
- Order: Mesostigmata
- Family: Ologamasidae
- Genus: Sessiluncus
- Species: S. heterotarsus

Binomial name
- Sessiluncus heterotarsus (Canestrini, 1897)

Species of mite

Sessiluncus heterotarsus is a species of mite in the family Ologamasidae.
