= Antennolaelaps testudo =

Scientific classification
- Domain: Eukaryota
- Kingdom: Animalia
- Phylum: Arthropoda
- Subphylum: Chelicerata
- Class: Arachnida
- Order: Mesostigmata
- Family: Ologamasidae
- Genus: Antennolaelaps
- Species: A. testudo

Binomial name
- Antennolaelaps testudo Lee, 1970

Species of mite

Antennolaelaps testudo is a species of mite in the family Ologamasidae.
