= Gamasitus =

Scientific classification
- Domain: Eukaryota
- Kingdom: Animalia
- Phylum: Arthropoda
- Subphylum: Chelicerata
- Class: Arachnida
- Order: Mesostigmata
- Superfamily: Rhodacaroidea
- Family: Ologamasidae
- Genus: Gamasitus; Womersley, 1956
- Species: G. obscurus

Binomial name
- Gamasitus obscurus Womersley, 1956

Genus of mites

Gamasitus is a genus of mites in the family Ologamasidae.

== Species ==
- Gamasitus obscurus Womersley, 1956
