= Onchogamasus communis =

Scientific classification
- Kingdom: Animalia
- Phylum: Arthropoda
- Subphylum: Chelicerata
- Class: Arachnida
- Order: Mesostigmata
- Family: Ologamasidae
- Genus: Onchogamasus
- Species: O. communis

Binomial name
- Onchogamasus communis Womersley, 1956

Species of mite

Onchogamasus communis is a species of mite in the family Ologamasidae, first described by Herbert Womersley in 1956.
