= Athiasella dentata =

Scientific classification
- Domain: Eukaryota
- Kingdom: Animalia
- Phylum: Arthropoda
- Subphylum: Chelicerata
- Class: Arachnida
- Order: Mesostigmata
- Family: Ologamasidae
- Genus: Athiasella
- Species: A. dentata

Binomial name
- Athiasella dentata (Womersley, 1942)

Species of mite

Athiasella dentata is a species of mite in the family Ologamasidae.
