= Desectophis eulateris =

Scientific classification
- Domain: Eukaryota
- Kingdom: Animalia
- Phylum: Arthropoda
- Subphylum: Chelicerata
- Class: Arachnida
- Order: Mesostigmata
- Family: Ologamasidae
- Genus: Desectophis
- Species: D. eulateris

Binomial name
- Desectophis eulateris (Karg, 1998)

Synonyms
- Acuphis eulateris Karg, 1998

Species of mite

Desectophis eulateris is a species of mite in the family Ologamasidae.
