= Rhodacaroides =

Scientific classification
- Domain: Eukaryota
- Kingdom: Animalia
- Phylum: Arthropoda
- Subphylum: Chelicerata
- Class: Arachnida
- Order: Mesostigmata
- Superfamily: Rhodacaroidea
- Family: Ologamasidae
- Genus: Rhodacaroides; Willmann

Genus of mites

Rhodacaroides is a genus of mites in the family Ologamasidae. There are about 10 described species in Rhodacaroides.

== Species ==
These 10 species belong to the genus Rhodacaroides:

- Rhodacaroides aegyptiacus Willmann, 1959
- Rhodacaroides brevispiritus Karg, 1977
- Rhodacaroides calidus Karg, 1977
- Rhodacaroides coniunctus Karg, 1977
- Rhodacaroides costai (Sheals, 1962)
- Rhodacaroides crinitus Karg, 1979
- Rhodacaroides leptinochaetus (Ma, 2005)
- Rhodacaroides levis Karg, 1977
- Rhodacaroides minyaspis Lee, 1973
- Rhodacaroides unguellus Karg, 1979
