= Caliphis hickmani =

Scientific classification
- Domain: Eukaryota
- Kingdom: Animalia
- Phylum: Arthropoda
- Subphylum: Chelicerata
- Class: Arachnida
- Order: Mesostigmata
- Family: Ologamasidae
- Genus: Caliphis
- Species: C. hickmani

Binomial name
- Caliphis hickmani (Womersley, 1956)

Species of mite

Caliphis hickmani is a species of mite in the family Ologamasidae.
