= Parasitiphis =

Scientific classification
- Domain: Eukaryota
- Kingdom: Animalia
- Phylum: Arthropoda
- Subphylum: Chelicerata
- Class: Arachnida
- Order: Mesostigmata
- Superfamily: Rhodacaroidea
- Family: Ologamasidae
- Genus: Parasitiphis; Womersley, 1956

Genus of mites

Parasitiphis is a genus of mites in the family Ologamasidae. There are at least four described species in Parasitiphis.

== Species ==
These four species belong to the genus Parasitiphis:

- Parasitiphis aurora Lee, 1970
- Parasitiphis brunneus (Kramer, 1898)
- Parasitiphis jeanneli (André, 1947)
- Parasitiphis littoralis Womersley, 1956
