= Acuphis tetrapennatus =

Scientific classification
- Domain: Eukaryota
- Kingdom: Animalia
- Phylum: Arthropoda
- Subphylum: Chelicerata
- Class: Arachnida
- Order: Mesostigmata
- Family: Ologamasidae
- Genus: Acuphis
- Species: A. tetrapennatus

Binomial name
- Acuphis tetrapennatus Karg, 2006

Species of mite

Acuphis tetrapennatus is a species of mite in the family Ologamasidae. It was described in 2006 from specimens found in Ecuador and living in soil.
