= Hydrogamasus giardi =

Scientific classification
- Domain: Eukaryota
- Kingdom: Animalia
- Phylum: Arthropoda
- Subphylum: Chelicerata
- Class: Arachnida
- Order: Mesostigmata
- Family: Ologamasidae
- Genus: Hydrogamasus
- Species: H. giardi

Binomial name
- Hydrogamasus giardi (Berlese & Trouessart, 1889)

Species of mite

Hydrogamasus giardi is a species of mite in the family Ologamasidae.
