= Queenslandolaelaps vitzthumi =

Scientific classification
- Domain: Eukaryota
- Kingdom: Animalia
- Phylum: Arthropoda
- Subphylum: Chelicerata
- Class: Arachnida
- Order: Mesostigmata
- Family: Ologamasidae
- Genus: Queenslandolaelaps
- Species: Q. vitzthumi

Binomial name
- Queenslandolaelaps vitzthumi Womersley, 1956

Species of mite

Queenslandolaelaps vitzthumi is a species of mite in the family Ologamasidae.
