= Euepicrius queenslandicus =

Scientific classification
- Kingdom: Animalia
- Phylum: Arthropoda
- Subphylum: Chelicerata
- Class: Arachnida
- Order: Mesostigmata
- Family: Ologamasidae
- Genus: Euepicrius
- Species: E. queenslandicus

Binomial name
- Euepicrius queenslandicus Womersley, 1956

Species of mite

Euepicrius queenslandicus is a species of mite in the domain Eukaryota, Kingdom Animalia, Phylum Arthropoda, Subphylum Chelicerata, Class Arachnida, Order Mesotigmata, Family Ologamasidae, Genus Euepicrius and Species E. queenslandicus
