= Geogamasus brevisetosus =

Scientific classification
- Domain: Eukaryota
- Kingdom: Animalia
- Phylum: Arthropoda
- Subphylum: Chelicerata
- Class: Arachnida
- Order: Mesostigmata
- Family: Ologamasidae
- Genus: Geogamasus
- Species: G. brevisetosus

Binomial name
- Geogamasus brevisetosus Karg, 1997

Species of mite

Geogamasus brevisetosus is a species of mite in the family Ologamasidae.
