= Geogamasus pentaspinosus =

Scientific classification
- Domain: Eukaryota
- Kingdom: Animalia
- Phylum: Arthropoda
- Subphylum: Chelicerata
- Class: Arachnida
- Order: Mesostigmata
- Family: Ologamasidae
- Genus: Geogamasus
- Species: G. pentaspinosus

Binomial name
- Geogamasus pentaspinosus Karg, 1979

Species of mite

Geogamasus pentaspinosus is a species of mite in the family Ologamasidae.
