= Geogamasus brevitondentis =

Scientific classification
- Domain: Eukaryota
- Kingdom: Animalia
- Phylum: Arthropoda
- Subphylum: Chelicerata
- Class: Arachnida
- Order: Mesostigmata
- Family: Ologamasidae
- Genus: Geogamasus
- Species: G. brevitondentis

Binomial name
- Geogamasus brevitondentis Karg, 1998

Species of mite

Geogamasus brevitondentis is a species of mite in the family Ologamasidae.
