= Starkovia setosus =

Scientific classification
- Kingdom: Animalia
- Phylum: Arthropoda
- Subphylum: Chelicerata
- Class: Arachnida
- Order: Mesostigmata
- Family: Laelaptonyssidae
- Genus: Starkovia
- Species: S. setosus

Binomial name
- Starkovia setosus (Krantz, 2000)

Species of mite

Starkovia setosus is a species of mite in the family Laelaptonyssidae, found in North America.
