= Acugamasus plumitergus =

Scientific classification
- Domain: Eukaryota
- Kingdom: Animalia
- Phylum: Arthropoda
- Subphylum: Chelicerata
- Class: Arachnida
- Order: Mesostigmata
- Family: Ologamasidae
- Genus: Acugamasus
- Species: A. plumitergus

Binomial name
- Acugamasus plumitergus Karg, 1997

Species of mite

Acugamasus plumitergus is a species of mite in the family Ologamasidae.
