= Gamasiphis =

Scientific classification
- Domain: Eukaryota
- Kingdom: Animalia
- Phylum: Arthropoda
- Subphylum: Chelicerata
- Class: Arachnida
- Order: Mesostigmata
- Family: Ologamasidae
- Genus: Gamasiphis; Berlese, 1904

Genus of mites

Gamasiphis is a genus of mites in the family Ologamasidae. There are more than 60 described species in Gamasiphis.

== Species ==
These 68 species belong to the genus Gamasiphis:

- Gamasiphis adanalis Karg, 1990
- Gamasiphis aduncus Ma, 2004
- Gamasiphis anguis Karg, 1993
- Gamasiphis appendicularis Karg, 1993
- Gamasiphis arcuatus Trägårdh, 1952
- Gamasiphis ardor Karg, 1993
- Gamasiphis australicus Womersley, 1956
- Gamasiphis bengalensis Bhattacharyya, 1966
- Gamasiphis benoiti Loots, 1980
- Gamasiphis breviflagelli Karg, 1996
- Gamasiphis brevigenitalis Karg, 1993
- Gamasiphis caper Karg, 1995
- Gamasiphis conciliator Berlese, 1916
- Gamasiphis coniunctus Karg, 1995
- Gamasiphis decoris Karg, 1990
- Gamasiphis denticus Hafez & Nasr, 1979
- Gamasiphis elegantellus Berlese, 1910
- Gamasiphis ellipticus Karg, 1996
- Gamasiphis elongatellus Berlese, 1910
- Gamasiphis erinaceus Karg, 1993
- Gamasiphis euincisus Karg, 1996
- Gamasiphis eumagnus Karg, 1996
- Gamasiphis flagelli Karg, 1993
- Gamasiphis foliatus Karg, 1993
- Gamasiphis fornicatus Lee, 1970
- Gamasiphis furcatus Karg, 1990
- Gamasiphis gamasellus Berlese, 1913
- Gamasiphis gandensius Van Daele, 1975
- Gamasiphis hamatellus Karg, 1998
- Gamasiphis hamifer (Trägårdh, 1952)
- Gamasiphis hemicapillus Karg, 1990
- Gamasiphis holocapillus Karg, 1990
- Gamasiphis hyalinus Karg, 2003
- Gamasiphis illotus Fox, 1949
- Gamasiphis incisus Karg, 1993
- Gamasiphis incudis Karg, 1993
- Gamasiphis indicus Bhattacharyya, 1978
- Gamasiphis krieli Van Driel, Loots & Marais, 1977
- Gamasiphis lanceolatus Karg, 1987
- Gamasiphis lenifornicatus Lee, 1973
- Gamasiphis longiorsetosus Karg, 1997
- Gamasiphis longirimae Karg, 1997
- Gamasiphis macrorbis Karg, 1993
- Gamasiphis maheensis Loots, 1980
- Gamasiphis mediosetosus Karg, 2003
- Gamasiphis minoris Karg, 1996
- Gamasiphis novipulchellus Ma & Yin, 1998
- Gamasiphis ovoides Karg, 1993
- Gamasiphis parpulchellus Nasr & Mersal, 1986
- Gamasiphis paulista Castilho, Moraes & Narita, 2010
- Gamasiphis pilosellus Berlese, 1913
- Gamasiphis pinguis Karg, 1990
- Gamasiphis pinnatus Karg, 1998
- Gamasiphis plenosetosus Karg, 1994
- Gamasiphis productellus Berlese, 1923
- Gamasiphis pulchellus (Berlese, 1887)
- Gamasiphis quadruplicis Karg, 1990
- Gamasiphis saccus Lee, 1973
- Gamasiphis setosus Womersley, 1956
- Gamasiphis sextus Vitzthum, 1921
- Gamasiphis silvestris Karg, 2007
- Gamasiphis spinulosus Karg, 1995
- Gamasiphis superardor Karg, 1993
- Gamasiphis trituberosus Karg, 1990
- Gamasiphis turgicalcareus Ma, 2009
- Gamasiphis uncifer Trägårdh, 1931
- Gamasiphis undulatus Karg & Schorlemmer, 2009
- Gamasiphis vinculi Karg, 1994
