= Neogamasellevans =

Scientific classification
- Domain: Eukaryota
- Kingdom: Animalia
- Phylum: Arthropoda
- Subphylum: Chelicerata
- Class: Arachnida
- Order: Mesostigmata
- Family: Ologamasidae
- Genus: Neogamasellevans; Loots & Ryke, 1967

Genus of mites

Neogamasellevans is a genus of mites in the family Ologamasidae. There are about 14 described species in Neogamasellevans.

== Species ==
These 14 species belong to the genus Neogamasellevans:

- Neogamasellevans ammonis Karg & Schorlemmer, 2009
- Neogamasellevans armata Karg & Schorlemmer, 2009
- Neogamasellevans brevisetosa Karg, 1997
- Neogamasellevans brevitremata Karg, 1975
- Neogamasellevans dentata Karg, 1975
- Neogamasellevans furcatus Karg & Schorlemmer, 2011
- Neogamasellevans gracilis Karg & Schorlemmer, 2011
- Neogamasellevans longipes Karg & Schorlemmer, 2009
- Neogamasellevans longocalcaris Karg, 1975
- Neogamasellevans macrochela Karg, 1975
- Neogamasellevans ornata Karg, 1975
- Neogamasellevans preendopodalis Loots & Ryke 1967
- Neogamasellevans serrata Karg, 1975
- Neogamasellevans xylebori Van Daele, 1976
