= Cyrtolaelaps mucronatus =

Scientific classification
- Domain: Eukaryota
- Kingdom: Animalia
- Phylum: Arthropoda
- Subphylum: Chelicerata
- Class: Arachnida
- Order: Mesostigmata
- Family: Ologamasidae
- Genus: Cyrtolaelaps
- Species: C. mucronatus

Binomial name
- Cyrtolaelaps mucronatus (Canestrini & Canestrini, 1881)

Species of mite

Cyrtolaelaps mucronatus is a species of mite in the family Ologamasidae. It is found in Europe.
