= Cyrtolaelaps =

Scientific classification
- Domain: Eukaryota
- Kingdom: Animalia
- Phylum: Arthropoda
- Subphylum: Chelicerata
- Class: Arachnida
- Order: Mesostigmata
- Family: Ologamasidae
- Genus: Cyrtolaelaps; A.Berlese, 1887

Genus of mites

Cyrtolaelaps is a genus of mites in the family Ologamasidae. There are about 11 described species in Cyrtolaelaps.

== Species ==
These 12 species belong to the genus Cyrtolaelaps:

- Cyrtolaelaps aster (Berlese, 1918)
- Cyrtolaelaps berlesei Chelebiev, 1984
- Cyrtolaelaps chiropterae Karg, 1971
- Cyrtolaelaps gracilipes Banks, 1916
- Cyrtolaelaps kasakstanicus (Chelebiev, 1978)
- Cyrtolaelaps iphidiformis (Berlese, 1904)
- Cyrtolaelaps minor Willmann, 1952
- Cyrtolaelaps mucronatus (Canestrini & Canestrini, 1881)
- Cyrtolaelaps paraster Costa, 1961
- Cyrtolaelaps qinghaiensis Ma, 1988
- Cyrtolaelaps rectus (Berlese, 1920)
- Cyrtolaelaps spurius (Holzmann, 1969)
- Cyrtolaelaps subnudus (Berlese, 1918)
