= Litogamasus =

Scientific classification
- Kingdom: Animalia
- Phylum: Arthropoda
- Subphylum: Chelicerata
- Class: Arachnida
- Order: Mesostigmata
- Family: Ologamasidae
- Genus: Litogamasus; Lee, 1970

Genus of mites

Litogamasus is a genus of mites in the family Ologamasidae.

== Species ==
These two species belong to the genus Litogamasus:

- Litogamasus falcipes Lee & Hunter, 1974
- Litogamasus setosus (Kramer, 1898)
