= Evanssellus =

Scientific classification
- Domain: Eukaryota
- Kingdom: Animalia
- Phylum: Arthropoda
- Subphylum: Chelicerata
- Class: Arachnida
- Order: Mesostigmata
- Family: Ologamasidae
- Genus: Evanssellus; Ryke, 1961

Genus of arthropods

Evanssellus is a genus of mites in the family Ologamasidae. There are at least two described species in Evanssellus.

== Species ==
These two species belong to the genus Evanssellus:

- Evanssellus foliatus Ryke, 1961
- Evanssellus medusa (Lee, 1967)
