= Laelaptiella =

Scientific classification
- Domain: Eukaryota
- Kingdom: Animalia
- Phylum: Arthropoda
- Subphylum: Chelicerata
- Class: Arachnida
- Order: Mesostigmata
- Family: Ologamasidae
- Genus: Laelaptiella; Womersley, 1956

Genus of mites

Laelaptiella is a genus of mites in the family Ologamasidae. There are about five described species in Laelaptiella.

== Species ==
These five species belong to the genus Laelaptiella:

- Laelaptiella anomala Womersley, 1956
- Laelaptiella cultrata Karg, 1993
- Laelaptiella eupodalia Karg, 1996
- Laelaptiella mackerrasae (Domrow, 1957)
- Laelaptiella media Karg, 1976
