= Cymiphis =

Scientific classification
- Domain: Eukaryota
- Kingdom: Animalia
- Phylum: Arthropoda
- Subphylum: Chelicerata
- Class: Arachnida
- Order: Mesostigmata
- Family: Ologamasidae
- Genus: Cymiphis; Lee, 1970

Genus of mites

Cymiphis is a genus of mites in the family Ologamasidae. There are about seven described species in Cymiphis.

== Species ==
These seven species belong to the genus Cymiphis:

- Cymiphis cymosus (Lee, 1966)
- Cymiphis dumosus (Lee, 1966)
- Cymiphis leptosceles (Lee, 1966)
- Cymiphis mansoni (Lee, 1966)
- Cymiphis nucilis (Lee, 1966)
- Cymiphis validus (Lee, 1966)
- Cymiphis watsoni (Hirschmann, 1966)
