= Cyrtolaelaps qinghaiensis =

Scientific classification
- Domain: Eukaryota
- Kingdom: Animalia
- Phylum: Arthropoda
- Subphylum: Chelicerata
- Class: Arachnida
- Order: Mesostigmata
- Family: Ologamasidae
- Genus: Cyrtolaelaps
- Species: C. qinghaiensis

Binomial name
- Cyrtolaelaps qinghaiensis Ma, 1988

Species of mite

Cyrtolaelaps qinghaiensis is a species of mite in the family Ologamasidae.
