= Pachymasiphis =

Scientific classification
- Kingdom: Animalia
- Phylum: Arthropoda
- Subphylum: Chelicerata
- Class: Arachnida
- Order: Mesostigmata
- Family: Ologamasidae
- Genus: Pachymasiphis; Karg, 1996

Genus of mites

Pachymasiphis is a genus of mites in the family Ologamasidae.

== Species ==
- Pachymasiphis maior Karg, 1996
- Pachymasiphis porulatus Karg, 1996
