= Geogamasus =

Scientific classification
- Domain: Eukaryota
- Kingdom: Animalia
- Phylum: Arthropoda
- Subphylum: Chelicerata
- Class: Arachnida
- Order: Mesostigmata
- Family: Ologamasidae
- Genus: Geogamasus; Lee, 1970

Genus of mites

Geogamasus is a genus of mites in the family Ologamasidae. There are more than 30 described species in Geogamasus.

== Species ==
These 33 species belong to the genus Geogamasus:

- Geogamasus apophyseus Karg, 1976
- Geogamasus arcus Karg, 1976
- Geogamasus ardoris Karg, 1976
- Geogamasus bicirrus Karg, 1976
- Geogamasus bisetosus Karg, 1976
- Geogamasus brevisetosus Karg, 1997
- Geogamasus brevitondentis Karg, 1998
- Geogamasus cochlearis Karg, 1976
- Geogamasus coxalis (Sheals, 1962)
- Geogamasus cuneatus Karg, 1998
- Geogamasus delamarei (Sheals, 1962)
- Geogamasus diffindentis Karg, 1997
- Geogamasus fibularis Karg, 1976
- Geogamasus filicuspidis Karg, 1976
- Geogamasus flagellatus Karg, 1976
- Geogamasus foliaceus Karg, 1976
- Geogamasus forcipis Karg, 1976
- Geogamasus fornix Halliday, 2001
- Geogamasus furcatius Karg, 1976
- Geogamasus howardi Lee, 1970
- Geogamasus incisus Karg, 1976
- Geogamasus levispiritus Karg, 1998
- Geogamasus longifolii Karg & Schorlemmer, 2011
- Geogamasus longisetosus Karg, 1976
- Geogamasus minimus Lee, 1973
- Geogamasus monocuspidis Karg, 1976
- Geogamasus pentaspinosus Karg, 1979
- Geogamasus pisciformis Karg, 1997
- Geogamasus pugionis Karg, 1976
- Geogamasus reticulatus Karg, 1976
- Geogamasus skoshi Lee, 1970
- Geogamasus trispinosus Karg, 1976
- Geogamasus tuberosus Karg, 1976
