= Rhodacaroides calidus =

Scientific classification
- Domain: Eukaryota
- Kingdom: Animalia
- Phylum: Arthropoda
- Subphylum: Chelicerata
- Class: Arachnida
- Order: Mesostigmata
- Family: Ologamasidae
- Genus: Rhodacaroides
- Species: R. calidus

Binomial name
- Rhodacaroides calidus Karg, 1977

Species of mite

Rhodacaroides calidus is a species of mite in the family Ologamasidae.
