= Desectophis =

Scientific classification
- Domain: Eukaryota
- Kingdom: Animalia
- Phylum: Arthropoda
- Subphylum: Chelicerata
- Class: Arachnida
- Order: Mesostigmata
- Family: Ologamasidae
- Genus: Desectophis; Karg, 2003

Genus of mites

Desectophis is a genus of mites in the family Ologamasidae. There are at least four described species in Desectophis.

== Species ==
These four species belong to the genus Desectophis:

- Desectophis eulateris (Karg, 1998)
- Desectophis flagellatus Karg & Schorlemmer, 2011
- Desectophis magnosimilis Karg, 2003
- Desectophis pulcher Karg, 2003
