= Hydrogamasus =

Scientific classification
- Domain: Eukaryota
- Kingdom: Animalia
- Phylum: Arthropoda
- Subphylum: Chelicerata
- Class: Arachnida
- Order: Mesostigmata
- Family: Ologamasidae
- Genus: Hydrogamasus; Berlese, 1892

Genus of mites

Hydrogamasus is a genus of mites in the family Ologamasidae. There are at least four described species in Hydrogamasus.

== Species ==
These four species belong to the genus Hydrogamasus:

- Hydrogamasus giardi (Berlese & Trouessart, 1889)
- Hydrogamasus kensleri Luxton, 1967
- Hydrogamasus littoralis (Canestrini & Canestrini, 1881)
- Hydrogamasus vitzthumi Hirschmann, 1966
