= Euryparasitus citelli =

Scientific classification
- Domain: Eukaryota
- Kingdom: Animalia
- Phylum: Arthropoda
- Subphylum: Chelicerata
- Class: Arachnida
- Order: Mesostigmata
- Family: Ologamasidae
- Genus: Euryparasitus
- Species: E. citelli

Binomial name
- Euryparasitus citelli Bai & G.u.Chen, 1988

Species of mite

Euryparasitus citelli is a species of mite in the family Ologamasidae.
