= Heterogamasus calcarellus =

Scientific classification
- Domain: Eukaryota
- Kingdom: Animalia
- Phylum: Arthropoda
- Subphylum: Chelicerata
- Class: Arachnida
- Order: Mesostigmata
- Family: Ologamasidae
- Genus: Heterogamasus
- Species: H. calcarellus

Binomial name
- Heterogamasus calcarellus Lee, 1967

Species of mite

Heterogamasus calcarellus is a species of mite in the family Ologamasidae.
