= Gamasiphoides =

Scientific classification
- Domain: Eukaryota
- Kingdom: Animalia
- Phylum: Arthropoda
- Subphylum: Chelicerata
- Class: Arachnida
- Order: Mesostigmata
- Family: Ologamasidae
- Genus: Gamasiphoides; Womersley, 1956

Genus of mites

Gamasiphoides is a genus of mites in the family Ologamasidae. There are more than 20 described species in Gamasiphoides.

== Species ==
These 22 species belong to the genus Gamasiphoides:

- Gamasiphoides acanthioides Karg & Schorlemmer, 2011
- Gamasiphoides aitkeni Lee, 1970
- Gamasiphoides baloghi Karg, 1976
- Gamasiphoides brevisetis Karg, 1976
- Gamasiphoides caudatae Karg, 1996
- Gamasiphoides coniunctus Karg, 1976
- Gamasiphoides costai Lee & Hunter, 1974
- Gamasiphoides femoralis (Banks, 1916)
- Gamasiphoides gamasiphioides (Sheals, 1962)
- Gamasiphoides leptogenitalis Karg, 1993
- Gamasiphoides linealis Karg, 1976
- Gamasiphoides longocuspis Karg, 1976
- Gamasiphoides longosetis Karg, 1976
- Gamasiphoides longoventris Karg, 1976
- Gamasiphoides lootsi Halliday, 2005
- Gamasiphoides macquariensis (Hirschmann, 1966)
- Gamasiphoides octosetae Karg, 1976
- Gamasiphoides postanalis Karg, 1993
- Gamasiphoides procerus Karg & Schorlemmer, 2011
- Gamasiphoides propinquus (Womersley, 1956)
- Gamasiphoides rykei Halliday, 2005
- Gamasiphoides setosus Karg, 1976
