= Hiniphis =

Scientific classification
- Domain: Eukaryota
- Kingdom: Animalia
- Phylum: Arthropoda
- Subphylum: Chelicerata
- Class: Arachnida
- Order: Mesostigmata
- Family: Ologamasidae
- Genus: Hiniphis; Lee, 1970

Genus of mites

Hiniphis is a genus of mites in the family Ologamasidae. There are at least two described species in Hiniphis.

== Species ==
These two species belong to the genus Hiniphis:

- Hiniphis bipala Lee, 1973
- Hiniphis hinnus Lee, 1970
