= Caliphis =

Scientific classification
- Domain: Eukaryota
- Kingdom: Animalia
- Phylum: Arthropoda
- Subphylum: Chelicerata
- Class: Arachnida
- Order: Mesostigmata
- Family: Ologamasidae
- Genus: Caliphis; Lee, 1970

Genus of mites

Caliphis is a genus of mites in the family Ologamasidae. There are about 8 described species in Caliphis.

== Species ==
These 8 species belong to the genus Caliphis:

- Caliphis calvus Lee, 1970
- Caliphis eugenitalis Karg, 1993
- Caliphis hickmani (Womersley, 1956)
- Caliphis minisetae (Karg, 1993)
- Caliphis novaezelandiae (Womersley, 1956)
- Caliphis queenslandicus (Womersley, 1956)
- Caliphis schusteri (Hirschmann, 1966)
- Caliphis tamborinensis (Womersley, 1956)
