= Ologamasus =

Scientific classification
- Domain: Eukaryota
- Kingdom: Animalia
- Phylum: Arthropoda
- Subphylum: Chelicerata
- Class: Arachnida
- Order: Mesostigmata
- Family: Ologamasidae
- Genus: Ologamasus; Berlese, 1888

Genus of mites

Ologamasus is a genus of mites in the family Ologamasidae. There are about 19 described species in Ologamasus.

== Species ==
These 19 species belong to the genus Ologamasus:

- Ologamasus aberrans (Berlese, 1888)
- Ologamasus brevidigitus Karg & Schorlemmer, 2009
- Ologamasus brevisetosus Karg & Schorlemmer, 2009
- Ologamasus cananeiae Silva, Moraes & Krantz, 2007
- Ologamasus cavei Sheals, 1962
- Ologamasus distorta (Karg, 1976)
- Ologamasus foliatus Karg, 1976
- Ologamasus lanceolatus (Karg, 1976)
- Ologamasus latoventer Karg & Schorlemmer, 2009
- Ologamasus longisetosus (Schmolzer, 1995)
- Ologamasus mahunkai (Karg, 1979)
- Ologamasus membranosus Karg, 1976
- Ologamasus microcrinis (Karg, 1979)
- Ologamasus postpilus Karg & Schorlemmer, 2009
- Ologamasus simplicior (Berlese, 1914)
- Ologamasus simplicitus Karg & Schorlemmer, 2009
- Ologamasus striolatosimilis Karg, 1976
- Ologamasus striolatus (Berlese, 1916)
- Ologamasus testudinis (Karg, 1976)
- Ologamasus trituberculatus Karg & Schorlemmer, 2009
