= Cyrtolaelaps kasakstanicus =

Scientific classification
- Domain: Eukaryota
- Kingdom: Animalia
- Phylum: Arthropoda
- Subphylum: Chelicerata
- Class: Arachnida
- Order: Mesostigmata
- Family: Ologamasidae
- Genus: Cyrtolaelaps
- Species: C. kasakstanicus

Binomial name
- Cyrtolaelaps kasakstanicus (Cheleviev, 1978)

Synonyms
- Euryparasitus kasakstanicus Cheleviev, 1978

Species of mite

Cyrtolaelaps kasakstanicus is a species of mite in the family Ologamasidae.
