= Gamasellopsis =

Scientific classification
- Domain: Eukaryota
- Kingdom: Animalia
- Phylum: Arthropoda
- Subphylum: Chelicerata
- Class: Arachnida
- Order: Mesostigmata
- Family: Ologamasidae
- Genus: Gamasellopsis; Loots & Ryke, 1966

Genus of mites

Gamasellopsis is a genus of mites in the family Ologamasidae. There are at least four described species in Gamasellopsis.

== Species ==
These four species belong to the genus Gamasellopsis:

- Gamasellopsis curtipilus Loots & Ryke, 1966
- Gamasellopsis longipilus Loots & Ryke, 1966
- Gamasellopsis magoebaensis Loots & Ryke, 1966
- Gamasellopsis vandenbergi Loots & Ryke, 1966
