= Acuphis =

Scientific classification
- Domain: Eukaryota
- Kingdom: Animalia
- Phylum: Arthropoda
- Subphylum: Chelicerata
- Class: Arachnida
- Order: Mesostigmata
- Family: Ologamasidae
- Genus: Acuphis; Karg, 1998

Genus of mites

Acuphis is a genus of mites in the family Ologamasidae. There are at least three described species in Acuphis.

== Species ==
These three species belong to the genus Acuphis:

- Acuphis euarcus Karg, 1998
- Acuphis octornatus Karg, 1998
- Acuphis tetrapennatus Karg, 2006
