= Acugamasus punctatus =

Scientific classification
- Domain: Eukaryota
- Kingdom: Animalia
- Phylum: Arthropoda
- Subphylum: Chelicerata
- Class: Arachnida
- Order: Mesostigmata
- Family: Ologamasidae
- Genus: Acugamasus
- Species: A. punctatus

Binomial name
- Acugamasus punctatus (Womersley, 1942)

Species of mite

Acugamasus punctatus is a species of mite in the family Ologamasidae.
