= Stylochirus =

Scientific classification
- Kingdom: Animalia
- Phylum: Arthropoda
- Subphylum: Chelicerata
- Class: Arachnida
- Order: Mesostigmata
- Family: Ologamasidae
- Genus: Stylochirus; G. Canestrini & R. Canestrini, 1882

Synonyms
- Stilochirus G. & R. Canestrini, 1882; Iphidosoma Berlese, 1892; Physallolaelaps Berlese, 1908; Gamasiphis (Periphis) Berlese, 1914; Gamasiphis (Epiphis) Berlese, 1916; Gamasiphis (Megaliphis) Willmann, 1938; Stylochyrus Swafford et al., 2009 (Missp.)

Genus of mites

Stylochirus is a genus of mites in the family Ologamasidae.

== Species ==
- Stylochirus ampulliger (Berlese, 1908)
- Stylochirus caucasicus Bregetova, 1977
- Stylochirus fimetarius (J. Müller, 1859)
- Stylochirus giganteus (Willmann, 1938)
- Stylochirus haemisphaericus (C. L. Koch, 1842)
- Stylochirus minor (Willmann, 1953)
- Stylochirus rarior (Berlese, 1916)
- Stylochirus rovennensis (G. Canestrini & R. Canestrini, 1882)
