= Euryparasitus davydovae =

Scientific classification
- Domain: Eukaryota
- Kingdom: Animalia
- Phylum: Arthropoda
- Subphylum: Chelicerata
- Class: Arachnida
- Order: Mesostigmata
- Family: Ologamasidae
- Genus: Euryparasitus
- Species: E. davydovae

Binomial name
- Euryparasitus davydovae Bondarchuk & Buyakova, 1978

Species of mite

Euryparasitus davydovae is a species of mite in the family Ologamasidae.
