= Queenslandolaelaps =

Scientific classification
- Domain: Eukaryota
- Kingdom: Animalia
- Phylum: Arthropoda
- Subphylum: Chelicerata
- Class: Arachnida
- Order: Mesostigmata
- Family: Ologamasidae
- Genus: Queenslandolaelaps; Womersley, 1956

Genus of mites

Queenslandolaelaps is a genus of mites in the family Ologamasidae. There are at least two described species in Queenslandolaelaps.

== Species ==
These two species belong to the genus Queenslandolaelaps:

- Queenslandolaelaps berlesei Womersley, 1956
- Queenslandolaelaps vitzthumi Womersley, 1956
