= Onchogamasus =

Scientific classification
- Domain: Eukaryota
- Kingdom: Animalia
- Phylum: Arthropoda
- Subphylum: Chelicerata
- Class: Arachnida
- Order: Mesostigmata
- Superfamily: Rhodacaroidea
- Family: Ologamasidae
- Genus: Onchogamasus; Womersley, 1956

Genus of mites

Onchogamasus is a genus of mites in the family Ologamasidae.

== Species ==
- Onchogamasus communis Womersley, 1956
- Onchogamasus heterosetae Karg, 1996
- Onchogamasus pumilio Lee, 1970
- Onchogamasus quasicurtipilus Lee, 1970
