= Teranyssus =

Scientific classification
- Kingdom: Animalia
- Phylum: Arthropoda
- Subphylum: Chelicerata
- Class: Arachnida
- Order: Mesostigmata
- Superfamily: Rhodacaroidea
- Family: Teranyssidae; Halliday, 2006
- Genus: Teranyssus; Halliday, 2006
- Species: T. howardensis

Binomial name
- Teranyssus howardensis Halliday, 2006

Genus of mites

Teranyssus is a genus of mites in the family Teranyssidae, the sole genus in the family. There is currently only one species in this genus, Teranyssus howardensis.
