= Allogamasellus aquafortensis =

Scientific classification
- Domain: Eukaryota
- Kingdom: Animalia
- Phylum: Arthropoda
- Subphylum: Chelicerata
- Class: Arachnida
- Order: Mesostigmata
- Family: Ologamasidae
- Genus: Allogamasellus
- Species: A. aquafortensis

Binomial name
- Allogamasellus aquafortensis Athias-Henriot, 1961

Species of mite

Allogamasellus aquafortensis is a species of mite in the family Ologamasidae.
