= Euryparasitus calcarator =

Scientific classification
- Domain: Eukaryota
- Kingdom: Animalia
- Phylum: Arthropoda
- Subphylum: Chelicerata
- Class: Arachnida
- Order: Mesostigmata
- Family: Ologamasidae
- Genus: Euryparasitus
- Species: E. calcarator

Binomial name
- Euryparasitus calcarator (Banks, 1910)

Species of mite

Euryparasitus calcarator is a species of mite in the family Ologamasidae.
