= Starkovia hallidayi =

Scientific classification
- Domain: Eukaryota
- Kingdom: Animalia
- Phylum: Arthropoda
- Subphylum: Chelicerata
- Class: Arachnida
- Order: Mesostigmata
- Family: Laelaptonyssidae
- Genus: Starkovia
- Species: S. hallidayi

Binomial name
- Starkovia hallidayi (Krantz, 2000)

Species of mite

Starkovia hallidayi is a species of mite in the family Laelaptonyssidae, found in Australia. It was first described in 2000 by Gerald W. Krantz as Laelaptonyssus hallidayi.
