= Gamaselliphis =

Scientific classification
- Domain: Eukaryota
- Kingdom: Animalia
- Phylum: Arthropoda
- Subphylum: Chelicerata
- Class: Arachnida
- Order: Mesostigmata
- Family: Ologamasidae
- Genus: Gamaselliphis; Ryke, 1961

Genus of mites

Gamaselliphis is a genus of mites in the family Ologamasidae. There are about five described species in Gamaselliphis.

== Species ==
These five species belong to the genus Gamaselliphis:

- Gamaselliphis cathkini (Ryke, 1961)
- Gamaselliphis grahamstowni (Ryke, 1961)
- Gamaselliphis lawrencei (Ryke, 1961)
- Gamaselliphis montanellus (Ryke, 1961)
- Gamaselliphis potchefstroomensis (Ryke, 1961)
