= Euryparasitus changanensis =

Scientific classification
- Kingdom: Animalia
- Phylum: Arthropoda
- Subphylum: Chelicerata
- Class: Arachnida
- Order: Mesostigmata
- Family: Ologamasidae
- Genus: Euryparasitus
- Species: E. changanensis

Binomial name
- Euryparasitus changanensis Gu & Huang, 1992

Species of mite

Euryparasitus changanensis is a species of mite in the family Ologamasidae.
