= Euryparasitus emarginatus =

Scientific classification
- Domain: Eukaryota
- Kingdom: Animalia
- Phylum: Arthropoda
- Subphylum: Chelicerata
- Class: Arachnida
- Order: Mesostigmata
- Family: Ologamasidae
- Genus: Euryparasitus
- Species: E. emarginatus

Binomial name
- Euryparasitus emarginatus (Koch, 1839)

Species of mite

Euryparasitus emarginatus is a species of mite in the family Ologamasidae. It is found in Europe.
