= Gamasellevans =

Scientific classification
- Domain: Eukaryota
- Kingdom: Animalia
- Phylum: Arthropoda
- Subphylum: Chelicerata
- Class: Arachnida
- Order: Mesostigmata
- Family: Ologamasidae
- Genus: Gamasellevans; Loots & Ryke, 1967

Genus of mites

Gamasellevans is a genus of mites in the family Ologamasidae. There are about seven described species in Gamasellevans.

== Species ==
These seven species belong to the genus Gamasellevans:

- Gamasellevans bispermadactylus Loots & Ryke, 1967
- Gamasellevans epigynialis Loots & Ryke, 1967
- Gamasellevans evansi Loots & Ryke, 1967
- Gamasellevans magoebaensis Loots & Ryke, 1967
- Gamasellevans reticulatus Loots & Ryke, 1967
- Gamasellevans spermadactylus Loots & Ryke, 1967
- Gamasellevans vandenbergi Loots & Ryke, 1967
