= Euepicrius =

Scientific classification
- Kingdom: Animalia
- Phylum: Arthropoda
- Subphylum: Chelicerata
- Class: Arachnida
- Order: Mesostigmata
- Family: Ologamasidae
- Genus: Euepicrius; Womersley, 1942

Genus of mites

Euepicrius is a genus of mites in the family Ologamasidae.

== Species ==
- Euepicrius bipeltatus Karg, 1997
- Euepicrius brevicruris Karg, 1993
- Euepicrius caesariatus (Lee & Hunter, 1974)
- Euepicrius femuralis Karg, 1993
- Euepicrius filamentosus Womersley, 1942
- Euepicrius lootsi Lee, 1970
- Euepicrius multipori Karg, 1993
- Euepicrius queenslandicus Womersley, 1956
