= Solugamasus =

Scientific classification
- Kingdom: Animalia
- Phylum: Arthropoda
- Subphylum: Chelicerata
- Class: Arachnida
- Order: Mesostigmata
- Family: Ologamasidae
- Genus: Solugamasus; Lee, 1973

Genus of mites

Solugamasus is a monotypic genus of mites in the family Ologamasidae. Its sole species is Solugamasus mustela Lee, 1973.
