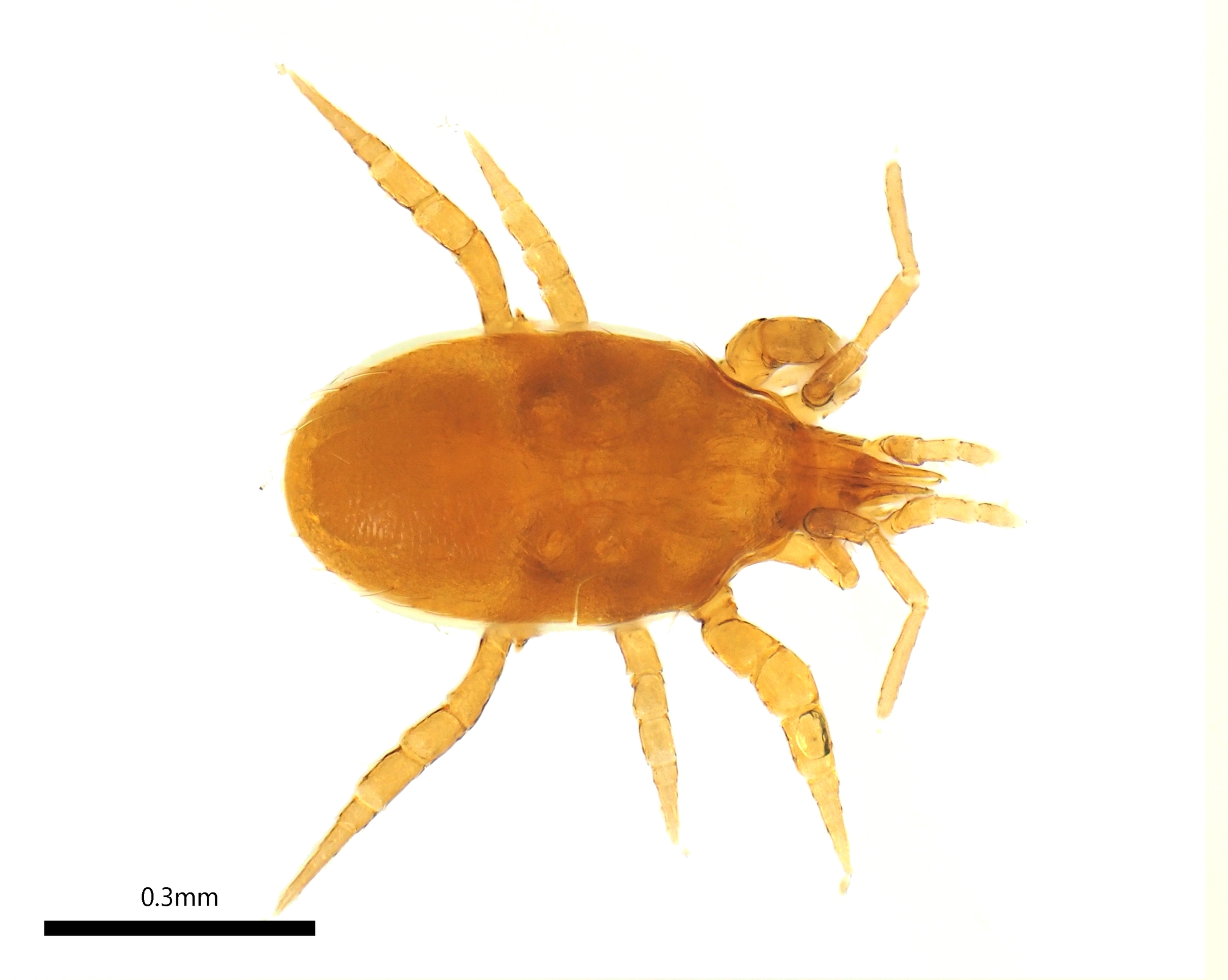

Scientific classification
- Domain: Eukaryota
- Kingdom: Animalia
- Phylum: Arthropoda
- Subphylum: Chelicerata
- Class: Arachnida
- Order: Mesostigmata
- Family: Ologamasidae
- Genus: Athiasella; Lee, 1973

= Athiasella =

Genus of mites

Athiasella is a genus of mites in the family Ologamasidae. There are about 18 described species in Athiasella.

== Species ==
These 18 species belong to the genus Athiasella:

- Athiasella australica (Womersley, 1942)
- Athiasella biconi Karg, 1993
- Athiasella caverna Halliday, 2001
- Athiasella coniuncta Karg, 1993
- Athiasella dentata (Womersley, 1942)
- Athiasella goei (Lee, 1970)
- Athiasella hami Karg, 1993
- Athiasella longiseta Lee & Hunter, 1974
- Athiasella markmitchelli (Lee, 1970)
- Athiasella pecten Lee & Hunter, 1974
- Athiasella relata (Womersley, 1942)
- Athiasella relicta (Womersley, 1942)
- Athiasella scaphosternum Lee & Hunter, 1974
- Athiasella sellaris Karg, 1996
- Athiasella stefani Halliday, 2001
- Athiasella tridentata (Karg, 1976)
- Athiasella tuberculata Karg, 1993
- Athiasella viripileus Lee & Hunter, 1974
