= Cyrtolaelaps paraster =

Scientific classification
- Domain: Eukaryota
- Kingdom: Animalia
- Phylum: Arthropoda
- Subphylum: Chelicerata
- Class: Arachnida
- Order: Mesostigmata
- Family: Ologamasidae
- Genus: Cyrtolaelaps
- Species: C. paraster

Binomial name
- Cyrtolaelaps paraster Costa, 1961

Species of mite

Cyrtolaelaps paraster is a species of mite in the family Ologamasidae.
