= Euryparasitus longicheta =

Scientific classification
- Domain: Eukaryota
- Kingdom: Animalia
- Phylum: Arthropoda
- Subphylum: Chelicerata
- Class: Arachnida
- Order: Mesostigmata
- Family: Ologamasidae
- Genus: Euryparasitus
- Species: E. longicheta

Binomial name
- Euryparasitus longicheta Bondarchuk & Buyakova, 1978

Species of mite

Euryparasitus longicheta is a species of mite in the family Ologamasidae.
