= Antennolaelaps =

Scientific classification
- Domain: Eukaryota
- Kingdom: Animalia
- Phylum: Arthropoda
- Subphylum: Chelicerata
- Class: Arachnida
- Order: Mesostigmata
- Family: Ologamasidae
- Genus: Antennolaelaps; Womersley, 1956

Genus of mites

Antennolaelaps is a genus of mites in the family Ologamasidae.

== Species ==
- Antennolaelaps affinis Womersley, 1956
- Antennolaelaps alveolaris Karg, 1993
- Antennolaelaps aremenae Lee, 1973
- Antennolaelaps brevisetae Karg, 1996
- Antennolaelaps celox Lee, 1973
- Antennolaelaps convexa (Womersley, 1956)
- Antennolaelaps heterosetae Karg, 1993
- Antennolaelaps testudo Lee, 1970
