= Hydrogamasellus =

Scientific classification
- Domain: Eukaryota
- Kingdom: Animalia
- Phylum: Arthropoda
- Subphylum: Chelicerata
- Class: Arachnida
- Order: Mesostigmata
- Family: Ologamasidae
- Genus: Hydrogamasellus; Hirschmann, 1966

Genus of mites

Hydrogamasellus is a genus of mites in the family Ologamasidae. There are more than 20 described species in Hydrogamasellus.

== Species ==
These 23 species belong to the genus Hydrogamasellus:

- Hydrogamasellus antarcticus (Trägårdh, 1907)
- Hydrogamasellus antennatus Karg, 1976
- Hydrogamasellus armatissimus Karg, 1976
- Hydrogamasellus avium Karg, 1976
- Hydrogamasellus brevipilus Karg, 1976
- Hydrogamasellus brevispiritus Karg, 1998
- Hydrogamasellus bullarmatus Karg & Schorlemmer, 2009
- Hydrogamasellus calculus Karg, 1997
- Hydrogamasellus cicatricosus Karg, 1976
- Hydrogamasellus coleoptratus (Berlese, 1888)
- Hydrogamasellus conchatus Karg & Schorlemmer, 2009
- Hydrogamasellus contingentis Karg, 1997
- Hydrogamasellus crozetensis (Richters, 1907)
- Hydrogamasellus gaussi Lee, 1970
- Hydrogamasellus iaculi Karg & Schorlemmer, 2009
- Hydrogamasellus longopilus Karg, 1976
- Hydrogamasellus multospinosus Karg, 1976
- Hydrogamasellus nasutus Karg, 1976
- Hydrogamasellus racovitzai (Trouessart, 1903)
- Hydrogamasellus stipulae Karg, 1998
- Hydrogamasellus striatus (Sheals, 1962)
- Hydrogamasellus topali (Balogh, 1963)
- Hydrogamasellus ubatubaensis (Hirschmann, 1966)
