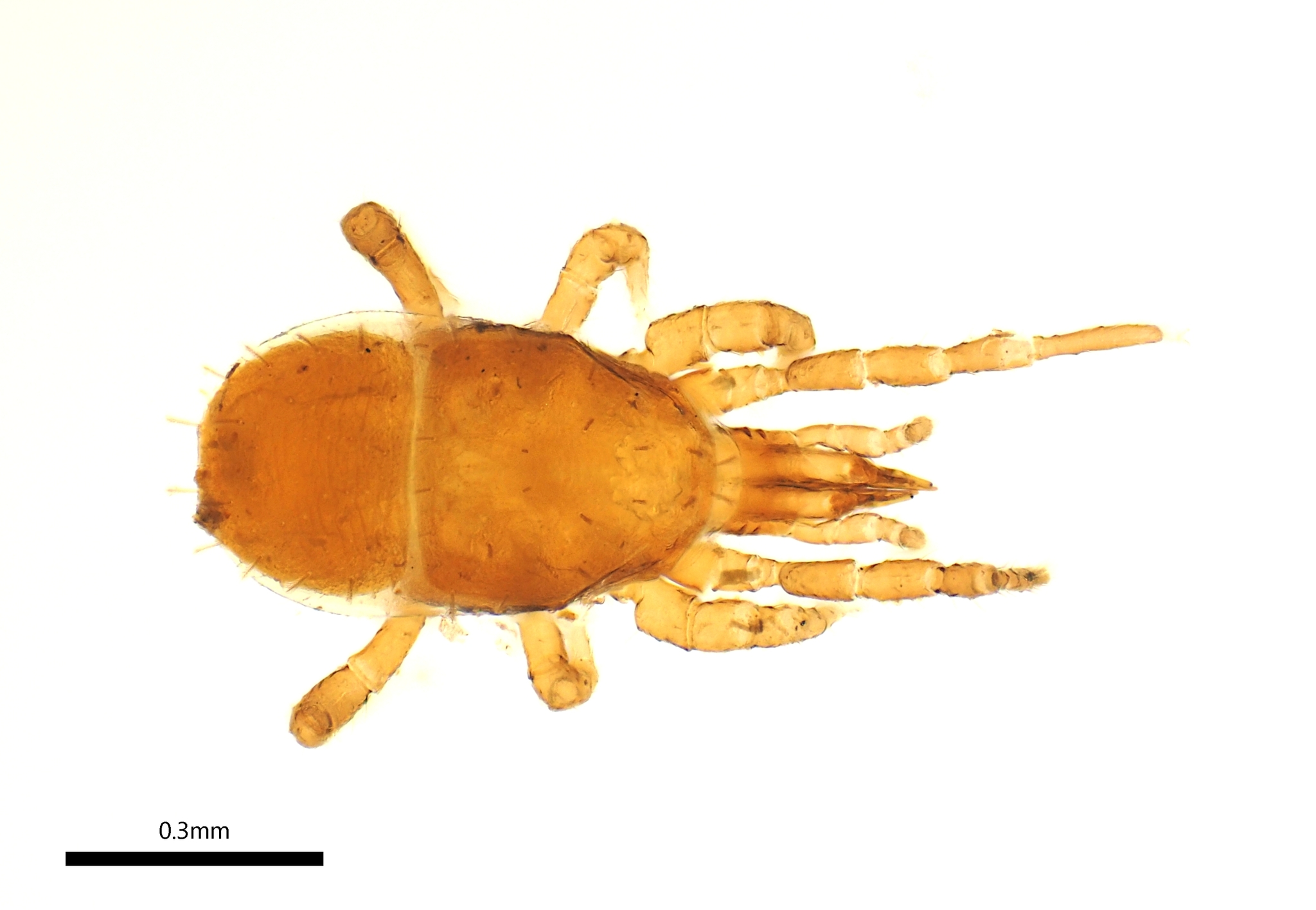

Scientific classification
- Domain: Eukaryota
- Kingdom: Animalia
- Phylum: Arthropoda
- Subphylum: Chelicerata
- Class: Arachnida
- Order: Mesostigmata
- Family: Ologamasidae
- Genus: Acugamasus; Lee, 1970

= Acugamasus =

Genus of mites

Acugamasus is a genus of mites in the family Ologamasidae. There are about 19 described species in the genus Acugamasus.

== Species ==
These 19 species belong to the genus Acugamasus:

- Acugamasus cursor Lee, 1970
- Acugamasus drakensbergensis (Ryke, 1962)
- Acugamasus elachyaspis Lee, 1973
- Acugamasus grahami (Ryke, 1962)
- Acugamasus hluhluwensis (Ryke, 1962)
- Acugamasus knysnaensis (Ryke, 1962)
- Acugamasus losovensis (Pinchuk, 1972)
- Acugamasus macrosetosus (Ryke, 1962)
- Acugamasus montanus (Willmann, 1936)
- Acugamasus natalensis (Ryke, 1962)
- Acugamasus neotasmanicus (Ryke, 1962)
- Acugamasus nepotulus (Berlese, 1908)
- Acugamasus paranatalensis (Ryke, 1962)
- Acugamasus parvipectus Karg, 1977
- Acugamasus plumitergus Karg, 1997
- Acugamasus punctatus (Womersley, 1942)
- Acugamasus semipunctatus (Womersley, 1942)
- Acugamasus tuberculatus Karg, 1993
- Acugamasus watsoni (Hirschmann, 1966)
