= Starkovia termitophila =

Scientific classification
- Kingdom: Animalia
- Phylum: Arthropoda
- Subphylum: Chelicerata
- Class: Arachnida
- Order: Mesostigmata
- Family: Laelaptonyssidae
- Genus: Starkovia
- Species: S. termitophila

Binomial name
- Starkovia termitophila Lombardini, 1947

Species of mite

Starkovia termitophila is a species of mite in the family Rhodacaridae.
