= Euryparasitus =

Scientific classification
- Kingdom: Animalia
- Phylum: Arthropoda
- Subphylum: Chelicerata
- Class: Arachnida
- Order: Mesostigmata
- Family: Ologamasidae
- Genus: Euryparasitus; Oudemans, 1902

Genus of mites

Euryparasitus is a genus of mites in the family Ologamasidae. There are about 15 described species in Euryparasitus.

== Species ==
These 15 species belong to the genus Euryparasitus:

- Euryparasitus calcarator (Banks, 1910)
- Euryparasitus changanensis Gu & Huang, 1992
- Euryparasitus citelli Bai & G.u.Chen, 1988
- Euryparasitus davydovae Bondarchuk & Buyakova, 1978
- Euryparasitus emarginatus (Koch, 1839)
- Euryparasitus goncharovi Bondarchuk & Buyakova, 1976
- Euryparasitus laxiventralis Gu & Guo, 1995
- Euryparasitus longicheta Bondarchuk & Buyakova, 1978
- Euryparasitus maseri Hagele, Kaufman, Whitaker & Klompen, 2005
- Euryparasitus medius Zuevsknj, 1971
- Euryparasitus occidentalis Hagele, Kaufman, Whitaker & Klompen, 2005
- Euryparasitus pagumae Ishikawa, 1988
- Euryparasitus taojiangensis Ma, 1982
- Euryparasitus tori Davydova, 1970
- Euryparasitus tragardhi Bregetova, 1977
