= Allogamasellus =

Scientific classification
- Domain: Eukaryota
- Kingdom: Animalia
- Phylum: Arthropoda
- Subphylum: Chelicerata
- Class: Arachnida
- Order: Mesostigmata
- Family: Ologamasidae
- Genus: Allogamasellus; Athias-Henriot, 1961

Genus of mites

Allogamasellus is a genus of mites in the family Ologamasidae. There are at least two described species in Allogamasellus.

== Species ==
These two species belong to the genus Allogamasellus:

- Allogamasellus aquafortensis Athias-Henriot, 1961
- Allogamasellus squalidus Athias-Henriot, 1961
