= Heydeniella =

Scientific classification
- Domain: Eukaryota
- Kingdom: Animalia
- Phylum: Arthropoda
- Subphylum: Chelicerata
- Class: Arachnida
- Order: Mesostigmata
- Family: Ologamasidae
- Genus: Heydeniella; Richters, 1907

Genus of mites

Heydeniella is a genus of mites in the family Ologamasidae. There are about five described species in Heydeniella.

== Species ==
These five species belong to the genus Heydeniella:

- Heydeniella crozetensis Richters, 1907
- Heydeniella leei Karg, 1976
- Heydeniella loricata (Trägårdh, 1907)
- Heydeniella sherrae Lee & Hunter, 1974
- Heydeniella womersleyi Lee & Hunter, 1974
