= Heterogamasus =

Scientific classification
- Domain: Eukaryota
- Kingdom: Animalia
- Phylum: Arthropoda
- Subphylum: Chelicerata
- Class: Arachnida
- Order: Mesostigmata
- Family: Ologamasidae
- Genus: Heterogamasus; Trägårdh, 1907

Genus of mites

Heterogamasus is a genus of mites in the family Ologamasidae. There are about five described species in Heterogamasus.

== Species ==
These five species belong to the genus Heterogamasus:

- Heterogamasus calcarellus Lee, 1967
- Heterogamasus claviger Tragardh, 1907
- Heterogamasus euarmatus Karg, 1977
- Heterogamasus inermus Karg, 1977
- Heterogamasus spinosissimus (Balogh, 1963)
