= Starkovia =

Scientific classification
- Kingdom: Animalia
- Phylum: Arthropoda
- Subphylum: Chelicerata
- Class: Arachnida
- Order: Mesostigmata
- Family: Laelaptonyssidae
- Genus: Starkovia; Lombardini, 1947

Genus of mites

Starkovia is a genus of mites in the family Laelaptonyssidae. There are about eight described species in Starkovia, some of which were transferred from the genus Laelaptonyssus when it was determined to be a synonym of Starkovia.

== Species ==
These eight species belong to the genus Starkovia:

- Starkovia chinensis (Samšinák, 1964)
- Starkovia darwiniensis (Halliday, 1987)
- Starkovia hallidayi (Krantz, 2000)
- Starkovia lacticolus (Halliday, 2006)
- Starkovia lenzi (Halliday, 1987)
- Starkovia mitis (Womersley, 1956)
- Starkovia setosus (Krantz, 2000)
- Starkovia termitophila Lombardini, 1947
