= Notogamasellus =

Scientific classification
- Domain: Eukaryota
- Kingdom: Animalia
- Phylum: Arthropoda
- Subphylum: Chelicerata
- Class: Arachnida
- Order: Mesostigmata
- Family: Ologamasidae
- Genus: Notogamasellus; Loots & Ryke, 1966
- Species: N. vandenbergi

Binomial name
- Notogamasellus vandenbergi Loots & Ryke, 1965

Genus of mites

Notogamasellus is a genus of mites in the family Ologamasidae. There is at least one described species in Notogamasellus, N. vandenbergi.
