= Gamasellus =

Scientific classification
- Domain: Eukaryota
- Kingdom: Animalia
- Phylum: Arthropoda
- Subphylum: Chelicerata
- Class: Arachnida
- Order: Mesostigmata
- Family: Ologamasidae
- Genus: Gamasellus; Berlese, 1892

Genus of mites

Gamasellus is a genus of mites in the family Ologamasidae. There are more than 60 described species in Gamasellus.

== Species ==
These 69 species belong to the genus Gamasellus:

- Gamasellus acutus Karg, 1997
- Gamasellus alexandrovae Davydova, 1982
- Gamasellus alpinus Schweizer, 1949
- Gamasellus bellavistae Emberson, 1967
- Gamasellus borealis (Koch, 1879)
- Gamasellus caucasicus Bregetova & Troitsky, 1981
- Gamasellus changbaiensis Bei & Yin, 1995
- Gamasellus concinus (Womersley, 1942)
- Gamasellus cooperi (Womersley, 1961)
- Gamasellus cophinus Lee, 1973
- Gamasellus davydovae Vinnik, 1993
- Gamasellus deepdalensis (Ryke, 1962)
- Gamasellus discutatus (Lee, 1966)
- Gamasellus dunhuaensis Ma, 2003
- Gamasellus exiquns Davydova, 1982
- Gamasellus ezoensis Ishikawa, 1983
- Gamasellus falciger (Canestrini & Canestrini, 1881)
- Gamasellus falculatus Athias-Henriot, 1961
- Gamasellus grishinae Davydova, 1982
- Gamasellus grossi Lee, 1973
- Gamasellus heteropilus (Karg, 1977)
- Gamasellus humosus Ishikawa, 1969
- Gamasellus kurilensis Bregetova & Troitsky, 1981
- Gamasellus lanceolatus Liang & Ishikawa, 1989
- Gamasellus lativentralis Ishikawa, 1983
- Gamasellus leggetti (Ryke, 1962)
- Gamasellus litoprothrix (Lee, 1966)
- Gamasellus morogoroensis Hurlbutt, 1979
- Gamasellus muscosus Hurlbutt, 1979
- Gamasellus nivalis Schweizer, 1949
- Gamasellus orientalis Davydova, 1982
- Gamasellus peninsularis Ishikawa, 1976
- Gamasellus plumatilis Karg, 1993
- Gamasellus plumosus Ishikawa, 1983
- Gamasellus puberulus Davydova, 1982
- Gamasellus pulcherimus Davydova, 1982
- Gamasellus pyriformis Berlese, 1916
- Gamasellus quartornatus Karg, 1997
- Gamasellus quintornatus Karg, 1996
- Gamasellus radicolus (Karg, 1977)
- Gamasellus robustipes Berlese, 1908
- Gamasellus sexornatus Karg, 1997
- Gamasellus shcherbakae Davydova, 1982
- Gamasellus shongweniensis (Ryke, 1962)
- Gamasellus silvaticus Davydova, 1982
- Gamasellus silvestris Halašková, 1958
- Gamasellus simpliciseta Liang & Ishikawa, 1989
- Gamasellus southcotti (Lee, 1966)
- Gamasellus spiricornis (Canestrini & Canestrini, 1882)
- Gamasellus sternopunctatus Vinnik, 1993
- Gamasellus taeniatus Davydova, 1982
- Gamasellus tasmanicus (Womersley, 1956)
- Gamasellus tengkuofani (Bai, Yan & Wei, 2010)
- Gamasellus tianmuensis Liang & Ishikawa, 1989
- Gamasellus tindalei (Lee, 1966)
- Gamasellus tragardhi (Womersley, 1942)
- Gamasellus tschucotensis Davydova, 1982
- Gamasellus tundriensis Davydova, 1982
- Gamasellus tuvinycus Davydova, 1982
- Gamasellus uluguruensis Hurlbutt, 1979
- Gamasellus venustus Ishikawa, 1983
- Gamasellus vibrissatus Emberson, 1967
- Gamasellus villosus Davydova, 1982
- Gamasellus virgosus (Lee, 1966)
- Gamasellus virguncula (Lee, 1973)
- Gamasellus volkovi Davydova, 1982
- Gamasellus xini Liang & Ishikawa, 1989
- Gamasellus yastrebtsovi Vinnik, 1993
- Gamasellus yosiianus Ishikawa, 1999
