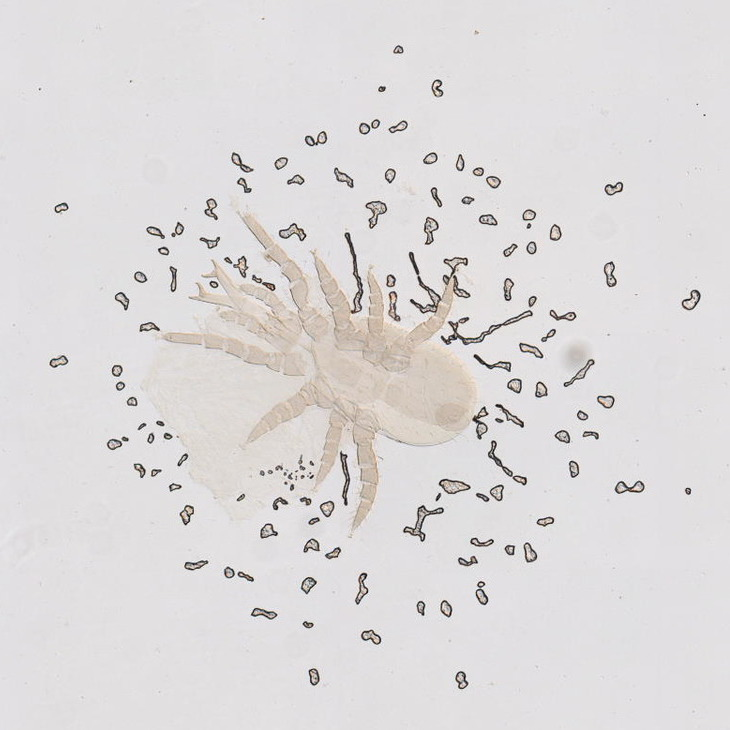
- Halolaelaps subtilis

Scientific classification
- Kingdom: Animalia
- Phylum: Arthropoda
- Subphylum: Chelicerata
- Class: Arachnida
- Order: Mesostigmata
- Infraorder: Gamasina
- Superfamily: Rhodacaroidea

= Rhodacaroidea =

Superfamily of mites

Rhodacaroidea is a superfamily of mites in the order Mesostigmata. There are 6 families with more than 900 described species in Rhodacaroidea, found worldwide.

These mites inhabit soil and litter, including rodent and nests, moss and lichen, termite nests, and sometimes tree trunks. Some are predators of small insects, mites, and springtails, and some have been found on bark beetles.

== Families ==
These six families belong to the superfamily Rhodacaroidea:

- Digamasellidae Evans
- Halolaelapidae Karg, 1965
- Laelaptonyssidae Womersley, 1956
- Ologamasidae Ryke, 1962
- Rhodacaridae Evans, 1957
- Teranyssidae Halliday, 2006
