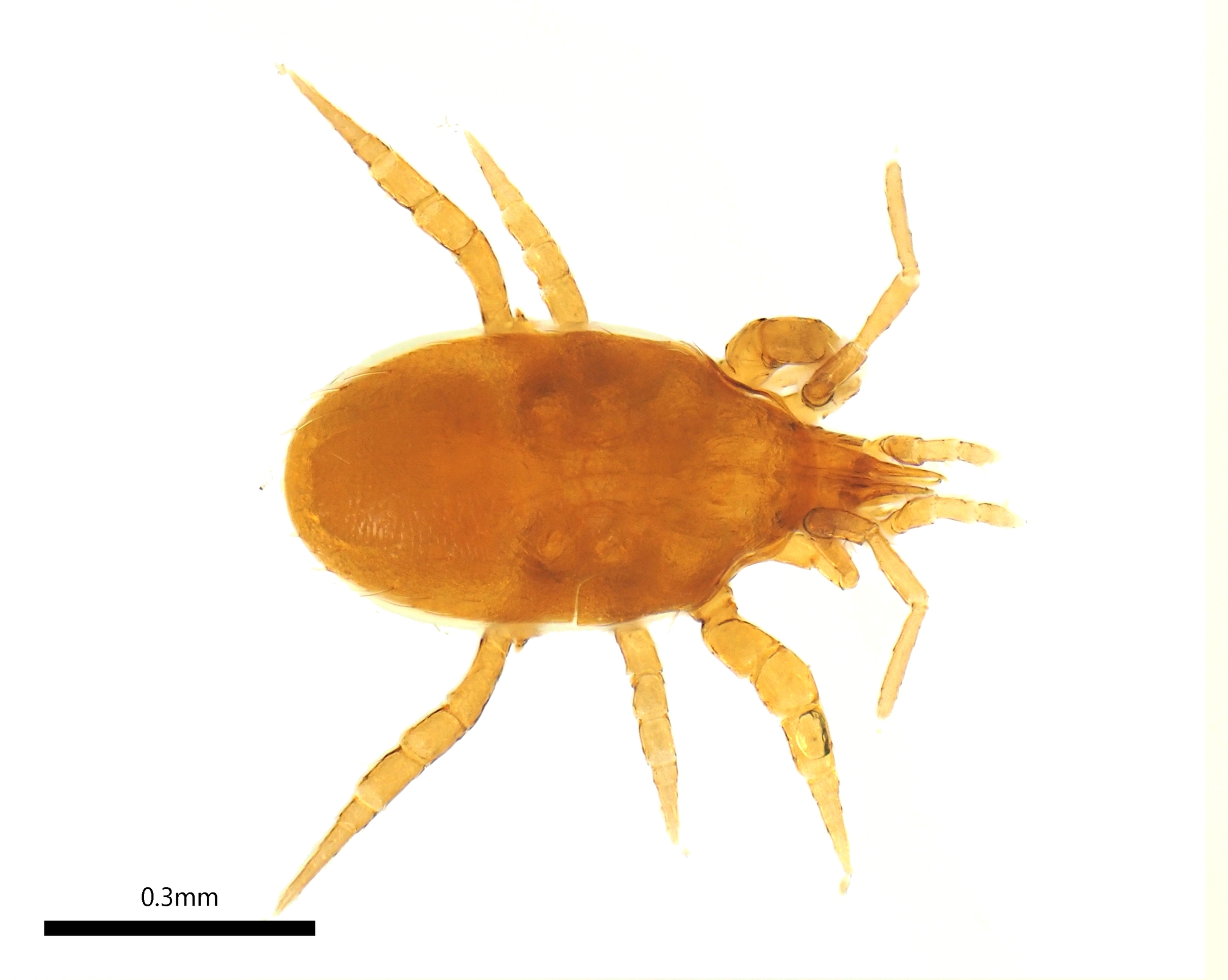
- Athiasella sp.

Scientific classification
- Kingdom: Animalia
- Phylum: Arthropoda
- Subphylum: Chelicerata
- Class: Arachnida
- Order: Mesostigmata
- Infraorder: Gamasina
- Superfamily: Rhodacaroidea
- Family: Ologamasidae; Ryke, 1962

= Ologamasidae =

Family of mites

Ologamasidae is a family of mites in the order Mesostigmata. There are more than 40 genera and 470 described species in Ologamasidae.

== Genera ==
These 44 genera belong to the family Ologamasidae:

- Acugamasus Lee, 1970
- Acuphis Karg, 1998
- Allogamasellus Athias-Henriot, 1961
- Antennolaelaps Womersley, 1956
- Athiasella Lee, 1973
- Caliphis Lee, 1970
- Cymiphis Lee, 1970
- Desectophis Karg, 2003
- Euepicrius Womersley, 1942
- Euryparasitus Oudemans, 1902
- Evanssellus Ryke, 1961
- Gamasellevans Loots & Ryke, 1967
- Gamaselliphis Ryke, 1961
- Gamasellopsis Loots & Ryke, 1966
- Gamasellus Berlese, 1892
- Gamasiphis Berlese, 1904
- Gamasiphoides Womersley, 1956
- Gamasitus Womersley, 1956
- Geogamasus Lee, 1970
- Heterogamasus Trägårdh, 1907
- Heydeniella Richters, 1907
- Hiniphis Lee, 1970
- Hydrogamasellus Hirschmann, 1966
- Hydrogamasus Berlese, 1892
- Laelaptiella Womersley, 1956
- Laelogamasus Berlese, 1905
- Litogamasus Lee, 1970
- Neogamasellevans Loots & Ryke, 1967
- Notogamasellus Loots & Ryke, 1965
- Ologamasus Berlese, 1888
- Onchogamasus Womersley, 1956
- Oriflammella Halliday, 2008
- Pachymasiphis Karg, 1996
- Parasitiphis Womersley, 1956
- Periseius Womersley, 1961
- Pilellus Lee, 1970
- Podonotogamasellus Loots & Ryke, 1965
- Pyriphis Lee, 1970
- Queenslandolaelaps Womersley, 1956
- Rhodacaroides Willmann
- Rykellus Lee, 1970
- Sessiluncus Canestrini, 1898
- Solugamasus Lee, 1973
- Stylochirus Canestrini & Canestrini, 1882
