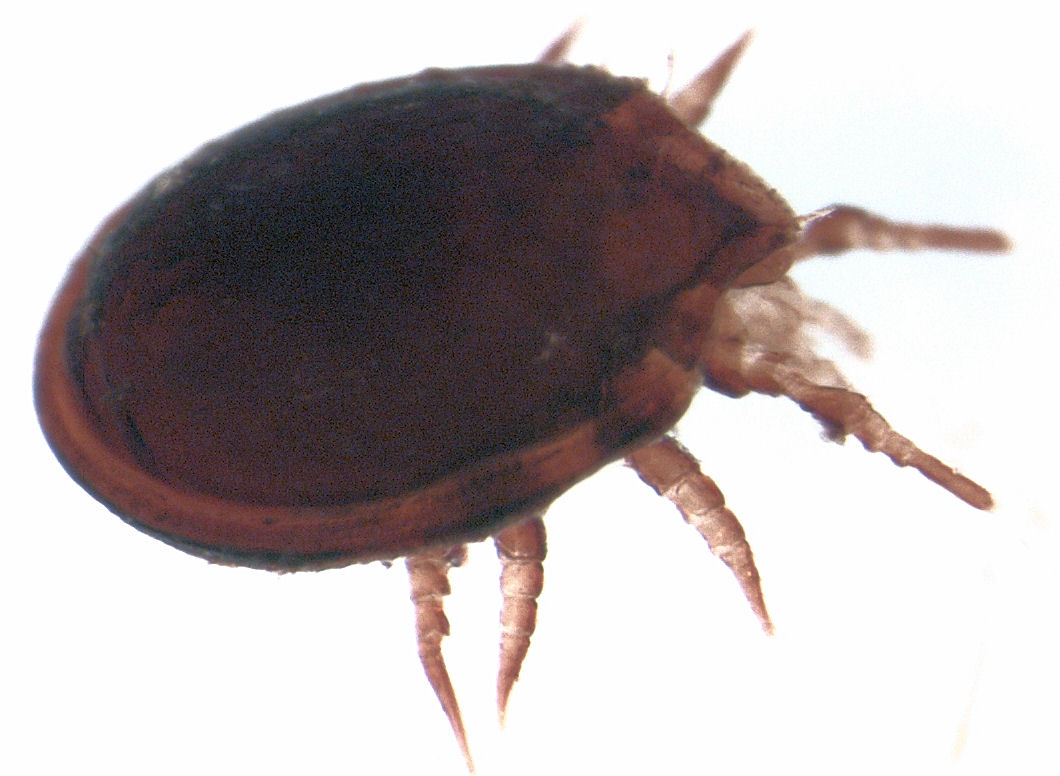

Scientific classification
- Kingdom: Animalia
- Phylum: Arthropoda
- Subphylum: Chelicerata
- Class: Arachnida
- Order: Mesostigmata
- Suborder: Monogynaspida
- Infraorder: Uropodina; Kramer, 1881

= Uropodina =

Infraorder of mites

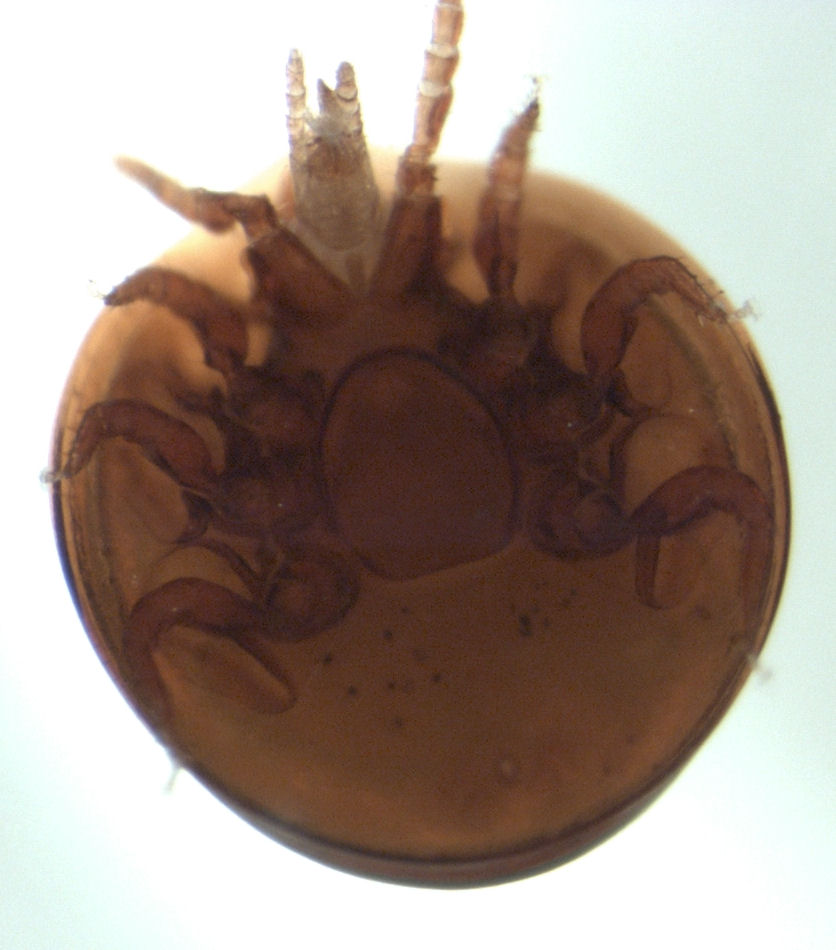
Ventral surface of Oplitis pusaterii

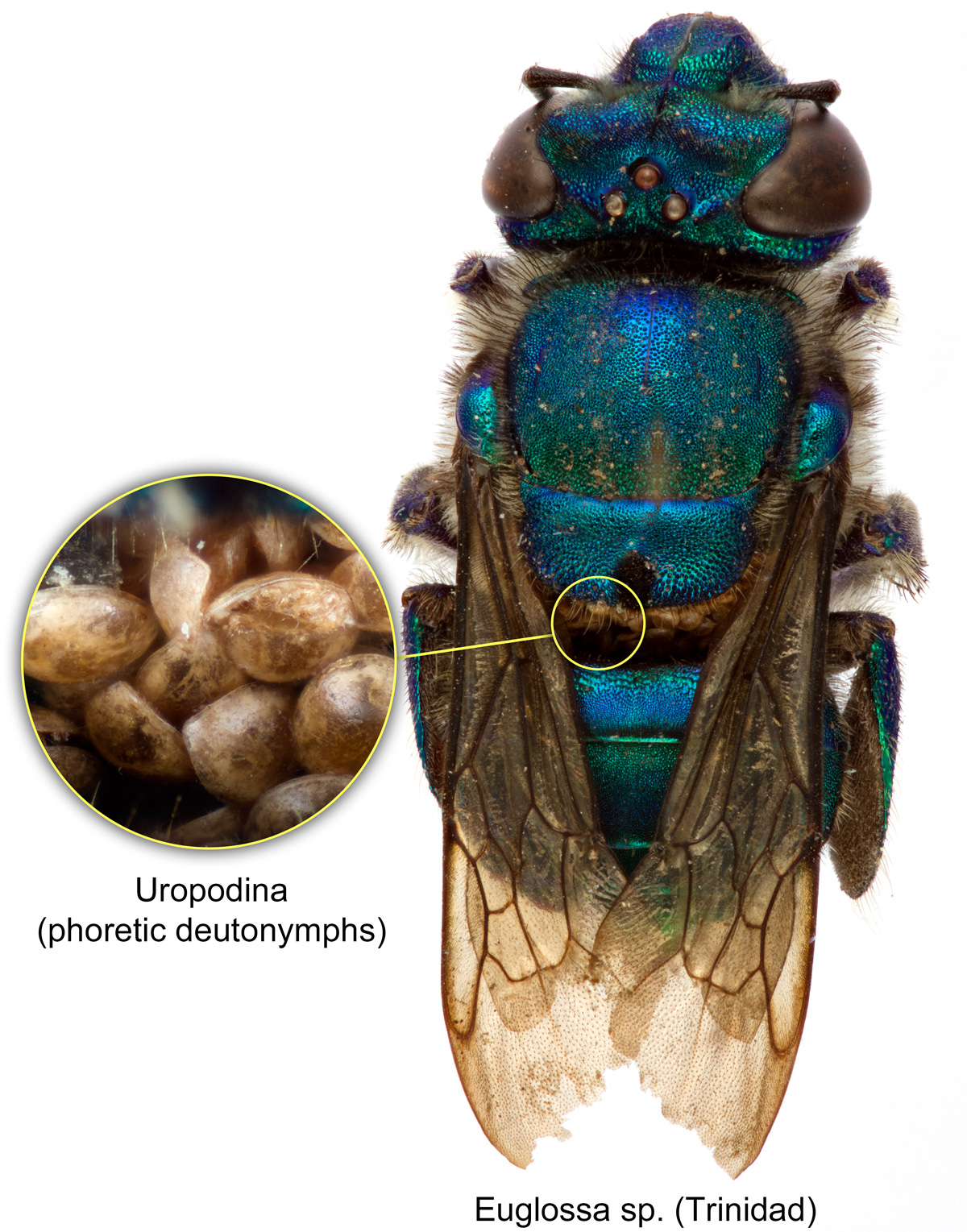
Uropodina on a Euglossa bee

Uropodina (from Ancient Greek οὐρά (ourá), meaning "tail", and πούς (poús), meaning "foot") is an infraorder of mites in the order Mesostigmata.

== Description ==
In Uropodina, the sternal and ventral shields are usually fused, the hypostomal setae are situated in a row, the legs are relatively short and with reduced setae, the coxae of the first leg pair are greatly enlarged to partially or entirely cover the base of the tritosternum, and the stigmata are situated between the second and third leg pairs.

Beyond this, Uropodina are morphologically variable and their taxonomy still a matter of debate. Many species are only known from some parts of their life cycle.

== Reproduction ==
Most species of Uropodina reproduce sexually, but some are capable of parthenogenesis. In these species, males either do not exist or are rare (usually less than 0.5% of the population).

== Ecology ==
Uropodina can be found in soil, forest litter, moss, lichen, under rocks, in nests of various animals, dung and carrion. They may reach abundances of 5,000 individuals/m^{2} in meadow soils and 2,000 individuals/m^{2} in agricultural soils. Most are predators of small invertebrates such as nematodes, while some may be fungivorous or herbivorous.

For Uropodina associated with dead wood, the tree species the wood originated from affects abundance and diversity. More Uropodina species occur in dead wood of deciduous trees than coniferous trees, with the highest diversity occurring in dead wood of beech, oak, pine, spruce, linden and hornbeam.

Many species are phoretic on other animals such as insects. During the deutonymph stage of their life cycle, they secrete an elastic pedicel to attach to an animal for transport.

Various Uropodina are associated with bees and/or bee nests: Trachytidae (Uroseius), Trematuridae (Trematura, Trichouropoda, Trichosociata, and Pseuduropoda), Uroactiniidae (Uroactinia), Urodinychidae (Uroobovella, Uroobovella (Fuscouropoda)), and Uropodidae (Uropoda). Their bee hosts include honey bees (Apis), bumble bees (Bombus), Euglossa orchid bees, and Melipona stingless bees. They are believed to be harmless to bees.

== Economic importance ==
A few species of Uropodina contaminate earthworm cultures and stored food.

== Zoogeography ==
Uropodina show a high degree of endemism, with many species only being found on one continent. That said, knowledge of species ranges is limited outside of Europe. At the level of genera, there are some genera only found in the northern hemisphere (Trachytes, Cilliba, Urodiaspis), some only in the southern hemisphere (Rotundabaloghia, Castriidinychus, Platysetosus, Acroseius, and Capricornelia), and others in both hemispheres.
