= Baloghibrasiluropoda =

Scientific classification
- Kingdom: Animalia
- Phylum: Arthropoda
- Subphylum: Chelicerata
- Class: Arachnida
- Order: Mesostigmata
- Family: Uropodidae
- Genus: Baloghibrasiluropoda; Hirschmann, 1973

Genus of mites

Baloghibrasiluropoda is a genus of tortoise mites in the family Uropodidae.
