= Castrinenteria =

Scientific classification
- Domain: Eukaryota
- Kingdom: Animalia
- Phylum: Arthropoda
- Subphylum: Chelicerata
- Class: Arachnida
- Order: Mesostigmata
- Family: Uropodidae
- Genus: Castrinenteria; Hirschmann, 1979

Genus of mites

Castrinenteria is a genus of tortoise mites in the family Uropodidae. There are at least two described species in Castrinenteria.

== Species ==
These two species belong to the genus Castrinenteria:

- Castrinenteria castrii (Hirschmann, 1972)
- Castrinenteria loksai (Hirschmann, 1972)
