= Brasiluropoda =

Scientific classification
- Kingdom: Animalia
- Phylum: Arthropoda
- Subphylum: Chelicerata
- Class: Arachnida
- Order: Mesostigmata
- Family: Uropodidae
- Genus: Brasiluropoda; Hirschmann & Zirngiebl-Nicol, 1964

Genus of mites

Brasiluropoda is a genus of tortoise mites in the family Uropodidae.
