= Jerzywisniewskia =

Scientific classification
- Domain: Eukaryota
- Kingdom: Animalia
- Phylum: Arthropoda
- Subphylum: Chelicerata
- Class: Arachnida
- Order: Mesostigmata
- Family: Uropodidae
- Genus: Jerzywisniewskia; Hirschmann, 1979

Genus of mites

Jerzywisniewskia is a genus of tortoise mites in the family Uropodidae.

The genus name honours Jerzy Wisniewski.
