= Hutufeideria =

Scientific classification
- Kingdom: Animalia
- Phylum: Arthropoda
- Subphylum: Chelicerata
- Class: Arachnida
- Order: Mesostigmata
- Family: Uropodidae
- Genus: Hutufeideria; Hirschmann & Hiramatsu, 1977

Species
- 6 (see text)

Genus of mites

Hutufeideria is a genus of tortoise mites that belongs to the family Uropodidae. Members of this genus can be found in Asia and Australia occurring in Japan, Thailand, New Guinea, Indonesia, Singapore, etc.

== Taxonomy ==
It was first described in 1977 by Werner Hirschmann (a German acarologist) and Nobuo Hiramatsu.

=== Species ===
There are currently six described species that belong to the genus Hutufeideria. They are listed below:

- Hutufeideria perakensis Kontschán J, Ábrahám R, Ermilov SG, 2026
- Hutufeideria phuketensis Kontschan 2011
- Hutufeideria sarawakensis Kontschán J, Ábrahám R, Ermilov SG, 2026
- Hutufeideria singaporensis Hirschmann & Hiramatsu, 1977
- Hutufeideria sumatraensis Kontschán J, Ábrahám R, Ermilov SG, 2026
- Hutufeideria thailandica Kontschan 2011
