= Congouropoda =

Scientific classification
- Kingdom: Animalia
- Phylum: Arthropoda
- Subphylum: Chelicerata
- Class: Arachnida
- Order: Mesostigmata
- Family: Uropodidae
- Genus: Congouropoda; Hirschmann & Hiramatsu, 1977

Genus of mites

Congouropoda is a genus of tortoise mites in the family Uropodidae.
