= Trachyte (disambiguation) =

Trachyte is a volcanic rock.

Trachyte may also refer to:

- Trachyte Creek, a stream in Utah
- Trachyte Hill, a hill in Antarctica
- Trachyte Hills, a mountain range in British Columbia, Canada

== See also ==
- Trachytes (mite)
