= Urocychellopsis =

Scientific classification
- Kingdom: Animalia
- Phylum: Arthropoda
- Subphylum: Chelicerata
- Class: Arachnida
- Order: Mesostigmata
- Family: Uropodidae
- Genus: Urocychellopsis; Willmann, 1953

Genus of mites

Urocychellopsis is a genus of tortoise mites in the family Uropodidae.
