= Longitrichanenteria =

Scientific classification
- Kingdom: Animalia
- Phylum: Arthropoda
- Subphylum: Chelicerata
- Class: Arachnida
- Order: Mesostigmata
- Family: Nenteriidae
- Genus: Longitrichanenteria; W. Hirschmann, 1985

Genus of arachnids

Longitrichanenteria is a genus of mites in the family Nenteriidae.

== Species ==
The following 6 species are within Longitrichanenteria:

- Longitrichanenteria densaeporula (Hirschmann, 1985)
- Longitrichanenteria longicrinis (Hirschmann, 1985)
- Longitrichanenteria longipilosa (Hirschmann, 1985)
- Longitrichanenteria longitricha (Hirschmann, 1972)
- Longitrichanenteria semicirculata (Hirschmann, 1985)
- Longitrichanenteria serrulata (Hirschmann & Wisniewski, 1985)
