= Ruehmnenteria =

Scientific classification
- Kingdom: Animalia
- Phylum: Arthropoda
- Subphylum: Chelicerata
- Class: Arachnida
- Order: Mesostigmata
- Family: Nenteriidae
- Genus: Ruehmnenteria; Hirschmann, 1979

Genus of mites

Ruehmnenteria is a genus of mites in the family Nenteriidae.

== Species ==
- Ruehmnenteria alzueti (Hirschmann, 1985)
- Ruehmnenteria bretonensis (Hirschmann, 1978)
- Ruehmnenteria breviunguiculata (Willmann, 1949)
- Ruehmnenteria chihuahuaensis (Hirschmann, 1978)
- Ruehmnenteria durangoensis (Hirschmann, 1978)
- Ruehmnenteria eulaelaptis (Vitzthum, 1930)
- Ruehmnenteria eutamiasae (Hirschmann, 1978)
- Ruehmnenteria gasellana (Hirschmann & Wisniewski, 1985)
- Ruehmnenteria hirschmanni (Wisniewski, 1979)
- Ruehmnenteria israelensis (Hirschmann & Hiramatsu, 1985)
- Ruehmnenteria japonensis (Hiramatsu, 1979)
- Ruehmnenteria javae (Wisniewski & Hirschmann, 1981)
- Ruehmnenteria kokopoana (Wisniewski & Hirschmann, 1990)
- Ruehmnenteria koreae (Hirschmann, 1981)
- Ruehmnenteria kurosai (Hiramatsu, 1979)
- Ruehmnenteria laosiana (Hirschmann & Wisniewski, 1985)
- Ruehmnenteria laplatae (Hirschmann, 1985)
- Ruehmnenteria longispinosa (Hirschmann & Wisniewski, 1985)
- Ruehmnenteria mahunkai (Hirschmann, 1972)
- Ruehmnenteria malayica (Vitzthum, 1921)
- Ruehmnenteria manca (Berlese, 1916)
- Ruehmnenteria margaritaensis (Sellnick, 1963)
- Ruehmnenteria mercuri (Hirschmann & Wisniewski, 1985)
- Ruehmnenteria microti (Hirschmann, 1978)
- Ruehmnenteria nuciphila (Hirschmann & Wisniewski, 1985)
- Ruehmnenteria orghidani (Hutu, 1977)
- Ruehmnenteria pallida (Vitzthum, 1925)
- Ruehmnenteria pisarskii (Hirschmann & Wisniewski, 1985)
- Ruehmnenteria plumata (Hirschmann & Wisniewski, 1985)
- Ruehmnenteria potosi (Hirschmann, 1978)
- Ruehmnenteria riedeli (Wisniewski & Hirschmann, 1990)
- Ruehmnenteria ruehmi (Hirschmann, 1972)
- Ruehmnenteria rwandae (Hirschmann & Wisniewski, 1985)
- Ruehmnenteria saltoensis (Hirschmann, 1978)
- Ruehmnenteria stylifera (Berlese, 1904)
- Ruehmnenteria sudanensis (Hirschmann, 1972)
- Ruehmnenteria sumatrensis (Hirschmann & Wisniewski, 1985)
- Ruehmnenteria uruguayensis (Wisniewski & Hirschmann, 1988)
- Ruehmnenteria venezolana (Sellnick, 1963)
- Ruehmnenteria venezuelae (Hirschmann & Wisniewski, 1985)
- Ruehmnenteria vitzthumi (Hirschmann & Wisniewski, 1985)
- Ruehmnenteria zerbabomia (Hilldigger Hohn, 1992)
