= Trichouropoda bipilis =

Scientific classification
- Kingdom: Animalia
- Phylum: Arthropoda
- Subphylum: Chelicerata
- Class: Arachnida
- Order: Mesostigmata
- Family: Trematuridae
- Genus: Trichouropoda
- Species: T. bipilis

Binomial name
- Trichouropoda bipilis (Vitzthum, 1921)

Species of mite

Trichouropoda bipilis is a species of arachnid of the order Mesostigmata and the family Trematuridae.

== Geographic distribution ==
It is found in Austria.
