= Tetrasejaspis =

Scientific classification
- Domain: Eukaryota
- Kingdom: Animalia
- Phylum: Arthropoda
- Subphylum: Chelicerata
- Class: Arachnida
- Order: Mesostigmata
- Family: Uropodidae
- Genus: Tetrasejaspis; Sellnick, 1941
- Species: T. sellnicki

Binomial name
- Tetrasejaspis sellnicki Hirschmann, 1973

Genus of tortoise mites

Tetrasejaspis is a genus of tortoise mites in the family Uropodidae. There is at least one described species in Tetrasejaspis, T. sellnicki.
