= Wernerhirschmannia =

Scientific classification
- Domain: Eukaryota
- Kingdom: Animalia
- Phylum: Arthropoda
- Subphylum: Chelicerata
- Class: Arachnida
- Order: Mesostigmata
- Family: Uropodidae
- Genus: Wernerhirschmannia; Hiramatsu, 1983

Type species
- Wernerhirschmannia prima

Genus of mites

Wernerhirschmannia is a genus of tortoise mites in the family Uropodidae.

The genus name honours Werner Hirschmann.
