= Antennequesoma =

Scientific classification
- Domain: Eukaryota
- Kingdom: Animalia
- Phylum: Arthropoda
- Subphylum: Chelicerata
- Class: Arachnida
- Order: Mesostigmata
- Family: Uropodidae
- Genus: Antennequesoma; Sellnick, 1926

Genus of mites

Antennequesoma is a genus of tortoise mites in the family Uropodidae. There are at least two described species in Antennequesoma.

== Species ==
These two species belong to the genus Antennequesoma:

- Antennequesoma longissima Elzinga
- Antennequesoma tenuatum Elzinga
