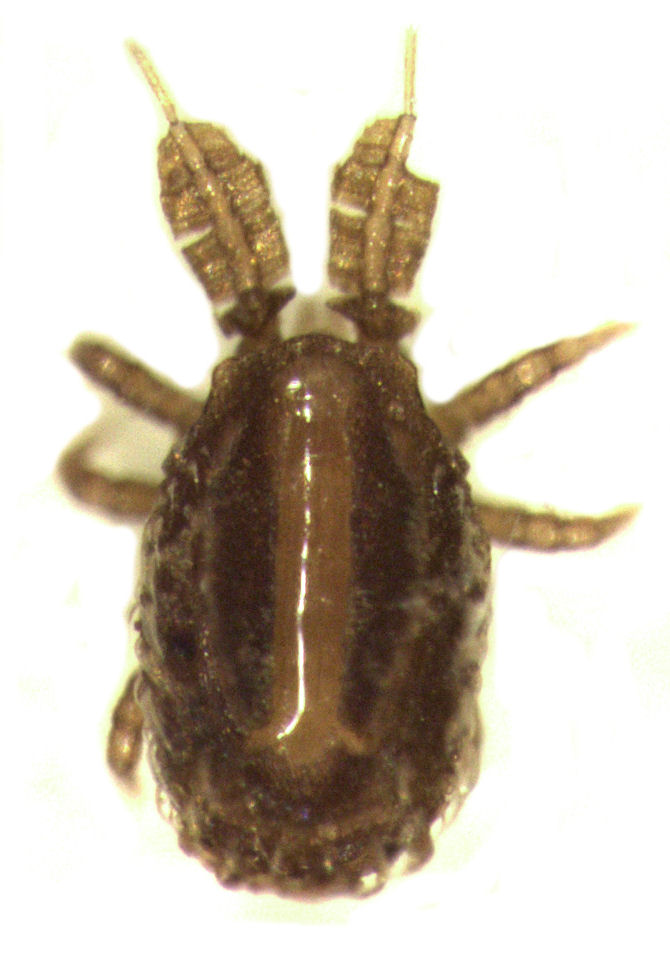
- Calotrachytes fimbriatipes

Scientific classification
- Kingdom: Animalia
- Phylum: Arthropoda
- Subphylum: Chelicerata
- Class: Arachnida
- Order: Mesostigmata
- Suborder: Monogynaspida
- Infraorder: Uropodina
- Superfamily: Uropodoidea
- Family: Polyaspididae; Berlese, 1913

= Polyaspididae =

Family of mites

Polyaspididae is a family of mites in the order Mesostigmata.

== Species ==
- Calotrachys Berlese, 1916
  - Calotrachys fimbriatipes (Michael, 1908)
- Dipolyaspis Berlese, 1916
  - Dipolyaspis sansonei (Berlese, 1916)
- Dyscritaspis Camin, 1953
  - Dyscritaspis whartoni Camin, 1953
- Polyaspis Berlese, 1881
  - Polyaspis australis Berlese, 1910
  - Polyaspis athiasae Hirschmann & Ztrngiebl-Nicol, 1969
  - Polyaspis bengalensis (Pramanik & Raychaudhuri, 1978)
  - Polyaspis berlesei Camin, 1954
  - Polyaspis bincheae Wisniewski & Hirschmann, 1984
  - Polyaspis calcuttaensis Sarkar & Sanyal, 1999
  - Polyaspis criocephali Wisniewski, 1980
  - Polyaspis flechtmanni Hirschmann & Kemnitzer, 1989
  - Polyaspis lamellipes Banks, 1914
  - Polyaspis nicolae Wisniewski & Hirschmann, 1984
  - Polyaspis patavinus Berlese, 1881
  - Polyaspis posnaniensis Wisniewski & Hirschmann, 1991
  - Polyaspis potchefstroomi Ryke, 1956
  - Polyaspis repandus Berlese, 1904
  - Polyaspis vitzthumi Hirschmann & Zirngiebl-Nicol, 1969
  - Polyaspis sclerophyllus (Michael, 1908)
