= Centrouropoda =

Scientific classification
- Kingdom: Animalia
- Phylum: Arthropoda
- Subphylum: Chelicerata
- Class: Arachnida
- Order: Mesostigmata
- Family: Uropodidae
- Genus: Centrouropoda; Berlese, 1917

Genus of mites

Centrouropoda is a genus of tortoise mites in the family Uropodidae. There are at least two described species in Centrouropoda.

== Species ==
These two species belong to the genus Centrouropoda:

- Centrouropoda brasiliana Wisniewski & Hirschmann, 1992
- Centrouropoda peruana Wisniewski & Hirschmann, 1992
