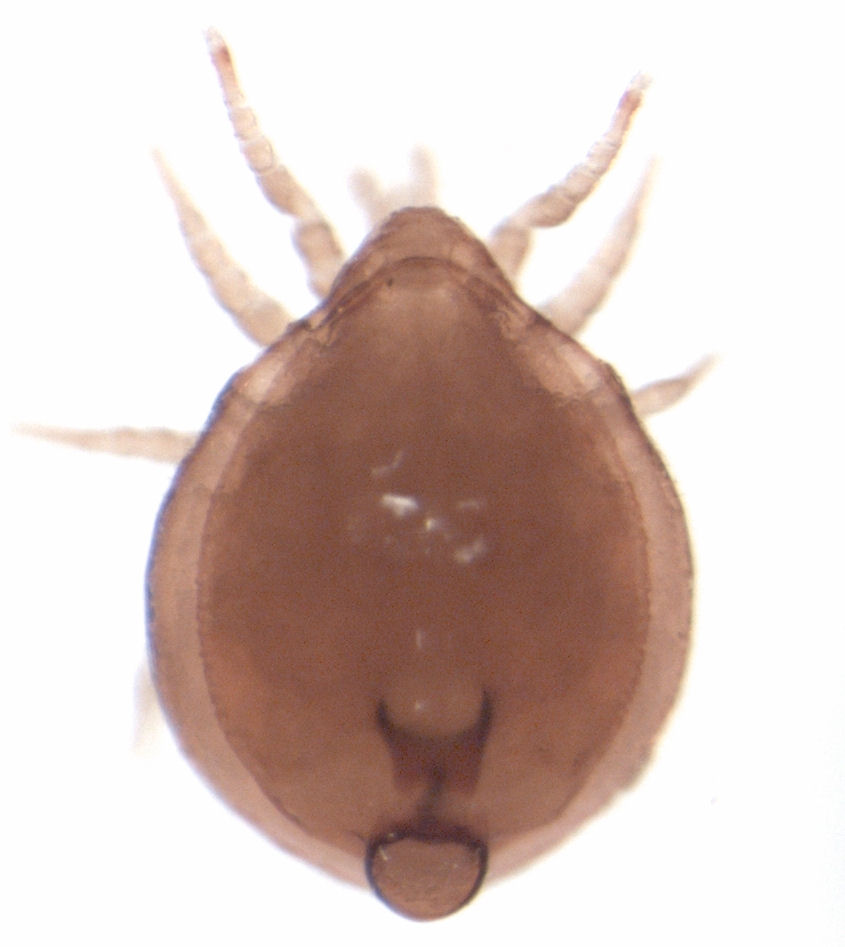
- Dorsal view of Uropoda thorpei
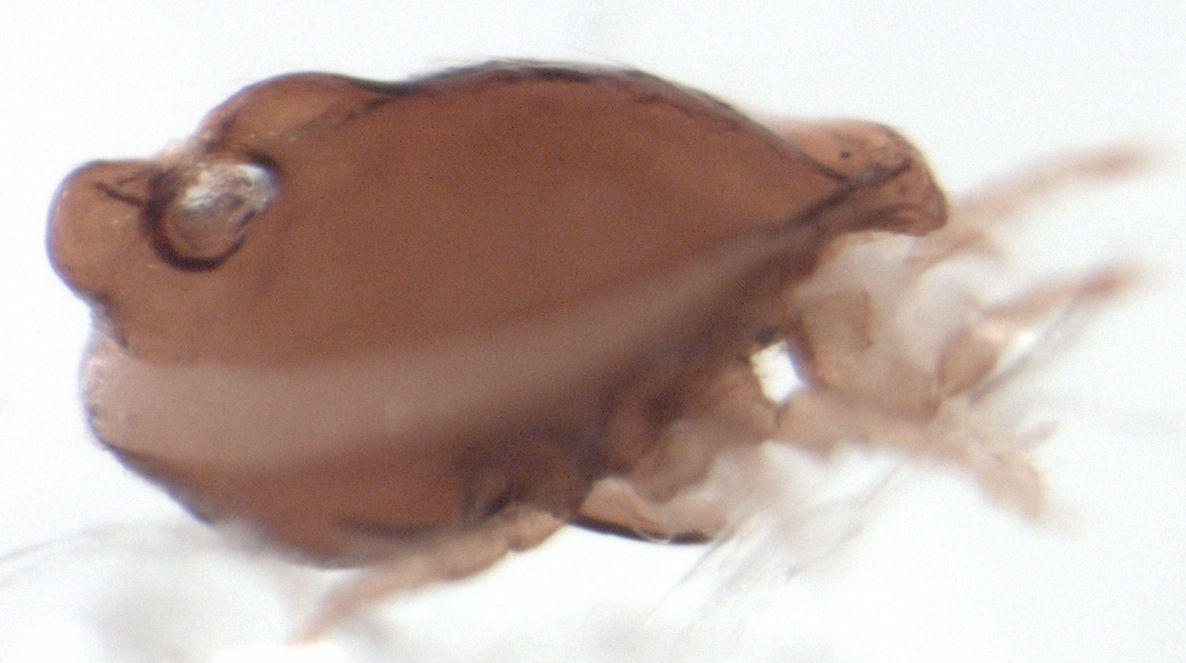
- Lateral view of Uropoda thorpei

Scientific classification
- Kingdom: Animalia
- Phylum: Arthropoda
- Subphylum: Chelicerata
- Class: Arachnida
- Order: Mesostigmata
- Family: Uropodidae
- Genus: Uropoda
- Species: U. thorpei

Binomial name
- Uropoda thorpei Kontschán, 2012

= Uropoda thorpei =

Species of tortoise mite

Uropoda thorpei, Thorpe's uropoda, is a species of tortoise mite belonging to the family Uropodidae. The species was first described by Jenő Kontschán in 2012, and is endemic to New Zealand.

== Taxonomy and etymology ==
The species was identified by Hungarian acarologist Jenő Kontschán in 2012, based on a holotype collected by J. T. Pusateri in 2008 from Laingholm, West Auckland, New Zealand. The genus name comes from Ancient Greek οὐρά (ourá), meaning 'tail', and πούς (poús), meaning 'foot'. Kontschán named the species after entomologist Stephen E. Thorpe, due to his work collecting uropodid species and his efforts to develop pages on Uropoda on Wikispecies.

== Description ==
U. thorpei had completely separated marginal and dorsal shields, with smooth, needle-like dorsal setae. Idisoma (bodies) of females of the species measure approximately 710 μm (0.028 in) in length with a width of 510 μm (0.020 in), while males' idisoma measure between 680–690 μm (0.027–0.027 in) in length and 530–540 μm (0.021–0.021 in) in width. It can be differentiated from other Uropoda due to smooth internal malae and the presence of a marginal shield.

== Distribution and habitat ==
The species is endemic to New Zealand.
