= Unguisnenteria =

Scientific classification
- Kingdom: Animalia
- Phylum: Arthropoda
- Subphylum: Chelicerata
- Class: Arachnida
- Order: Mesostigmata
- Family: Nenteriidae
- Genus: Unguisnenteria; W. Hirschmann, 1985

Genus of mites

Unguisnenteria is a genus of mites in the family Nenteriidae.

== Species ==
- Unguisnenteria gracilis (Hirschmann, 1985)
- Unguisnenteria unguis (Hirschmann, 1985)
