= Stammernenteria =

Scientific classification
- Kingdom: Animalia
- Phylum: Arthropoda
- Subphylum: Chelicerata
- Class: Arachnida
- Order: Mesostigmata
- Family: Nenteriidae
- Genus: Stammernenteria; Hirschmann, 1979

Genus of mites

Stammernenteria is a genus of mites in the family Nenteriidae.

== Species ==
- Stammernenteria argentinensis (Hirschmann, 1978)
- Stammernenteria hyatti (Hirschmann & Wisniewski, 1985)
- Stammernenteria jabanica (Vitzthum, 1931)
- Stammernenteria kashimensis (Hiramatsu, 1979)
- Stammernenteria mesoamericana (Hirschmann & Wisniewski, 1985)
- Stammernenteria micherdzinskii (Hirschmann & Zirngiebl-Nicol, 1969)
- Stammernenteria pacifica (Vitzthum, 1935)
- Stammernenteria pandioni (Wisniewski & Hirschmann, 1985)
- Stammernenteria pilosella (Berlese, 1903)
- Stammernenteria pilosellaoides (Hirschmann & Hiramatsu, 1978)
- Stammernenteria ritzemai (Oudemans, 1903)
- Stammernenteria ritzemaisimilis (Hirschmann & Hiramatsu, 1978)
- Stammernenteria semiporula (Hirschmann & Wisniewski, 1985)
- Stammernenteria stammeri (Hirschmann & Zirngiebl-Nicol, 1962)
- Stammernenteria uropodina (Berlese, 1918)
