= Perstructuranenteria =

Scientific classification
- Kingdom: Animalia
- Phylum: Arthropoda
- Subphylum: Chelicerata
- Class: Arachnida
- Order: Mesostigmata
- Family: Nenteriidae
- Genus: Perstructuranenteria; W. Hirschmann, 1985

Genus of mites

Perstructuranenteria is a genus of mites in the family Nenteriidae.

== Species ==
- Perstructuranenteria crateriformis (Hirschmann, 1985)
- Perstructuranenteria fici (Hirschmann, 1978)
- Perstructuranenteria perstructura (Hirschmann, 1985)
- Perstructuranenteria robusta (Hiramatsu, 1981)
- Perstructuranenteria superstructura (Hirschmann, 1985)
- Perstructuranenteria triacuta (Hirschmann, 1985)
