= Halozercon =

Scientific classification
- Kingdom: Animalia
- Phylum: Arthropoda
- Subphylum: Chelicerata
- Class: Arachnida
- Order: Mesostigmata
- Family: Halolaelapidae
- Genus: Halozercon; Wisniewski, Karg & Hirschmann, 1992

Genus of mites

Halozercon is a genus of mites in the family Halolaelapidae. There are about five described species in Halozercon.

== Species ==
These five species belong to the genus Halozercon:

- Halozercon barguzin Marchenko, 2018
- Halozercon capitaneus Marchenko, 2019
- Halozercon karacholana Wisniewski et al., 1992
- Halozercon kazachok Marchenko, 2019
- Halozercon tigerek Marchenko, 2019
