= Nobuohiramatsuia =

Scientific classification
- Domain: Eukaryota
- Kingdom: Animalia
- Phylum: Arthropoda
- Subphylum: Chelicerata
- Class: Arachnida
- Order: Mesostigmata
- Family: Uropodidae
- Genus: Nobuohiramatsuia; Hirschmann, 1990

Genus of mites

Nobuohiramatsuia is a genus of tortoise mites in the family Uropodidae.
