= Nenteriidae =

Scientific classification
- Kingdom: Animalia
- Phylum: Arthropoda
- Subphylum: Chelicerata
- Class: Arachnida
- Order: Mesostigmata
- Family: Nenteriidae; Hirschmann, 1979

Family of mites

Nenteriidae is a family of mites in the order Mesostigmata.

Nenteriidae is currently (2024) a nomen nudum, since it remains without a diagnosis. The name was first published in 1979 by Werner Hirschmann.

== Genera ==
- Austrodinychus Trägårdh, 1952
- Dobrogensisnenteria W. Hirschmann, 1985
- Longitrichanenteria W. Hirschmann, 1985
- Nenteria Oudemans, 1915
- Perstructuranenteria W. Hirschmann, 1985
- Ruehmnenteria Hirschmann, 1979
- Stammernenteria Hirschmann, 1979
- Unguisnenteria W. Hirschmann, 1985
