= Coxequesoma =

Scientific classification
- Domain: Eukaryota
- Kingdom: Animalia
- Phylum: Arthropoda
- Subphylum: Chelicerata
- Class: Arachnida
- Order: Mesostigmata
- Family: Uropodidae
- Genus: Coxequesoma; Sellnick, 1926

Genus of mites

Coxequesoma is a genus of tortoise mites in the family Uropodidae. There are about five described species in Coxequesoma.

== Species ==
These five species belong to the genus Coxequesoma:

- Coxequesoma collegianorum Sellnick, 1926
- Coxequesoma gignodissidens Elzinga
- Coxequesoma hermanni Elzinga
- Coxequesoma labidocoxata Elzinga
- Coxequesoma umbocauda Elzinga
