= Dobrogensisnenteria =

Scientific classification
- Kingdom: Animalia
- Phylum: Arthropoda
- Subphylum: Chelicerata
- Class: Arachnida
- Order: Mesostigmata
- Family: Nenteriidae
- Genus: Dobrogensisnenteria; W. Hirschmann, 1985

Genus of mites

Dobrogensisnenteria is a genus of mites in the family Nenteriidae.

== Species ==
- Dobrogensisnenteria banatica (Feider & Hutu, 1971)
- Dobrogensisnenteria dobrogensis (Feider & Hutu, 1971)
- Dobrogensisnenteria norimbergensis (Hirschmann & Zirngiebl-Nicol, 1969)
- Dobrogensisnenteria oudemansi (Hirschmann & Zirngiebl-Nicol, 1969)
- Dobrogensisnenteria oudemansiformis (Hirschmann, 1985)
- Dobrogensisnenteria postneri (Hirschmann & Zirngiebl-Nicol, 1969)
