= Leitneria granulata =

Scientific classification
- Domain: Eukaryota
- Kingdom: Animalia
- Phylum: Arthropoda
- Subphylum: Chelicerata
- Class: Arachnida
- Order: Mesostigmata
- Family: Halolaelapidae
- Genus: Leitneria
- Species: L. granulata

Binomial name
- Leitneria granulata (Halbert, 1923)

Species of mite

Leitneria granulata is a species of mite in the family Halolaelapidae.
