= Castriidinychus =

Scientific classification
- Domain: Eukaryota
- Kingdom: Animalia
- Phylum: Arthropoda
- Subphylum: Chelicerata
- Class: Arachnida
- Order: Mesostigmata
- Family: Uropodidae
- Genus: Castriidinychus; Hirschmann, 1973

Genus of mites

Castriidinychus is a genus of tortoise mites in the family Uropodidae. The genus was first described in 1973 by Werner Hirschmann.

According to the Interim Register of Marine and Nonmarine Genera there are 20 accepted species in Castriidinychus.
