= Leitneria (mite) =

Scientific classification
- Kingdom: Animalia
- Phylum: Arthropoda
- Subphylum: Chelicerata
- Class: Arachnida
- Order: Mesostigmata
- Infraorder: Gamasina
- Superfamily: Rhodacaroidea
- Family: Halolaelapidae
- Genus: Leitneria; Evans, 1957

Genus of mites

Leitneria is a genus of mites in the family Halolaelapidae.

== Species ==
- Leitneria granulatus (Halbert, 1923)
- Leitneria pugio (Karg, 1961)
