= Halozercon karacholana =

Scientific classification
- Kingdom: Animalia
- Phylum: Arthropoda
- Subphylum: Chelicerata
- Class: Arachnida
- Order: Mesostigmata
- Family: Halolaelapidae
- Genus: Halozercon
- Species: H. karacholana

Binomial name
- Halozercon karacholana Wisniewski et al., 1992

Species of mite

Halozercon karacholana is a species of mite in the family Halolaelapidae.
