= Halolaelaps celticus =

Scientific classification
- Kingdom: Animalia
- Phylum: Arthropoda
- Subphylum: Chelicerata
- Class: Arachnida
- Order: Mesostigmata
- Family: Halolaelapidae
- Genus: Halolaelaps
- Species: H. celticus

Binomial name
- Halolaelaps celticus Halbert, 1915

Species of mite

Halolaelaps celticus is a species of mite in the family Halolaelapidae.
