= Trematuroides =

Scientific classification
- Kingdom: Animalia
- Phylum: Arthropoda
- Subphylum: Chelicerata
- Class: Arachnida
- Order: Mesostigmata
- Family: Trematuridae
- Genus: Trematuroides; Cooreman, 1960

Genus of mites

Trematuroides is a genus of mites in the family Trematuridae.

== Species ==
- Trematuroides lindbergi Cooreman, 1960
