= Halolaelapidae =

Scientific classification
- Kingdom: Animalia
- Phylum: Arthropoda
- Subphylum: Chelicerata
- Class: Arachnida
- Order: Mesostigmata
- Superfamily: Rhodacaroidea
- Family: Halolaelapidae; Karg, 1965

Family of mites

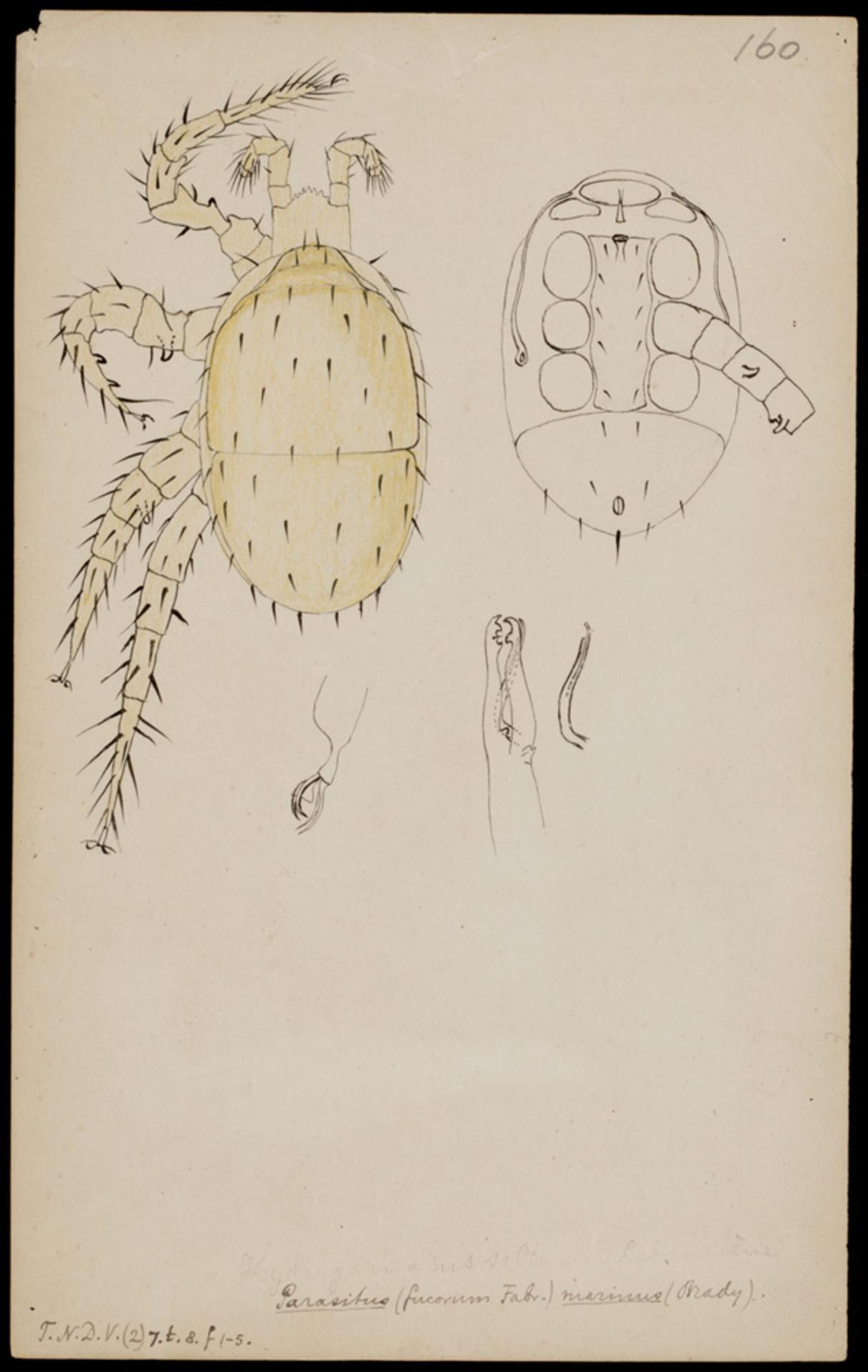
Haleolaelaps marinus

Halolaelapidae is a family of mites in the order Mesostigmata.

== Species ==
This family contains the following genera and species:

Dinychella Berlese, 1888

- Dinychella asperata Berlese, 1888

Halodarcia Karg, 1969

- Halodarcia incideta Karg, 1969
- Halodarcia porolata Karg, 1969
- Halodarcia carabidophila Evans and Fain, 1995
- Halodarcia kargi Nikolsky, 1982

Halolaelaps Berlese & Trouessart, 1889

- Halolaelaps aeronautus (Vitzthum, 1920)
- Halolaelaps areolatus (Leitner, 1946)
- Halolaelaps balticus Willmann, 1957
- Halolaelaps celticus Halbert, 1915
- Halolaelaps communis (Gotz, 1952)
- Halolaelaps coulsoni Gwiazdowicz & Teodorowicz, 2017
- Halolaelaps coxalis Willmann, 1957
- Halolaelaps curvisetosus (Leitner, 1946)
- Halolaelaps euxinus Trach 2016
- Halolaelaps fallax (Gotz, 1952)
- Halolaelaps holsaticus Vitzthum, 1931
- Halolaelaps incisus Hyatt, 1956
- Halolaelaps leitnerae (Gotz, 1952)
- Halolaelaps leptoscutatus Karg, 1971
- Halolaelaps marinus (Brady, 1875)
- Halolaelaps nodosus Berlese & Trouessart, 1889
- Halolaelaps octoclavatus (Vitzthum, 1920)
- Halolaelaps porulus (Gotz, 1952)
- Halolaelaps quadricavatus (Gotz, 1952)
- Halolaelaps remanei Willmann, 1952
- Halolaelaps saproincisus Hirschmann, 1966
- Halolaelaps sculpturatus Sellnick, 1940
- Halolaelaps sexclavatus (Oudemans, 1902)
- Halolaelaps simplex Willmann, 1957
- Halolaelaps soemermaai (Karg, 1965)
- Halolaelaps strenzkei (Gotz, 1952)
- Halolaelaps subtilis (Leitner, 1946)
- Halolaelaps suecicus Sellnick, 1957
- Halolaelaps tuerkorum (Gotz, 1952)
- Halolaelaps vicinus (Gotz, 1952)

Halozercon Wisniewski, Karg & Hirschmann, 1992

- Halozercon barguzin Marchenko, 2018
- Halozercon capitaneus Marchenko, 2019
- Halozercon karacholana Wisniewski et al., 1992
- Halozercon kazachok Marchenko, 2019
- Halozercon tigerek Marchenko, 2019

Leitneria Evans, 1957

- Leitneria granulata (Halbert, 1923)
- Leitneria pugio (Karg, 1961)

Saprolaelaps Leitner, 1946

- Saprolaelaps bacchusi Hyatt, 1956
- Saprolaelaps punctulatus Leitner, 1946

Saprosecans Karg, 1964

- Saprosecans baloghi Karg, 1964
- Saprosecans bialoviensis Gwiazdowicz, 2001
