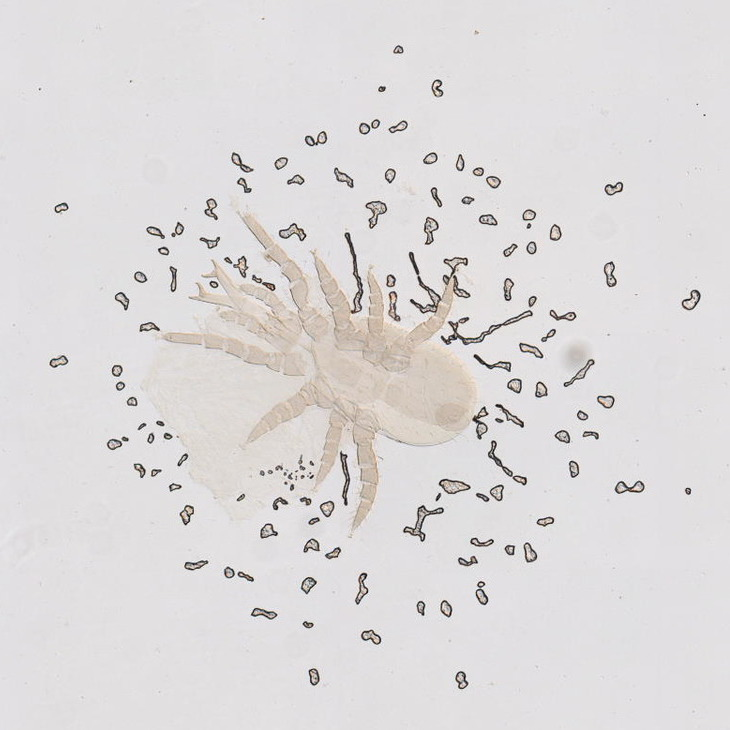
- Halolaelaps subtilis

Scientific classification
- Domain: Eukaryota
- Kingdom: Animalia
- Phylum: Arthropoda
- Subphylum: Chelicerata
- Class: Arachnida
- Order: Mesostigmata
- Family: Halolaelapidae
- Genus: Halolaelaps; Berlese & Trouessart, 1889

= Halolaelaps =

Genus of mites

Halolaelaps is a genus of mites in the family Halolaelapidae. There are about 30 described species in Halolaelaps.

== Species ==
These 30 species belong to the genus Halolaelaps:

- Halolaelaps aeronautus (Vitzthum, 1920)
- Halolaelaps areolatus (Leitner, 1946)
- Halolaelaps balticus Willmann, 1957
- Halolaelaps celticus Halbert, 1915
- Halolaelaps communis (Gotz, 1952)
- Halolaelaps coulsoni Gwiazdowicz & Teodorowicz, 2017
- Halolaelaps coxalis Willmann, 1957
- Halolaelaps curvisetosus (Leitner, 1946)
- Halolaelaps euxinus
- Halolaelaps fallax (Gotz, 1952)
- Halolaelaps holsaticus Vitzthum, 1931
- Halolaelaps incisus Hyatt, 1956
- Halolaelaps leitnerae (Gotz, 1952)
- Halolaelaps leptoscutatus Karg, 1971
- Halolaelaps marinus (Brady, 1875)
- Halolaelaps nodosus Berlese & Trouessart, 1889
- Halolaelaps octoclavatus (Vitzthum, 1920)
- Halolaelaps porulus (Gotz, 1952)
- Halolaelaps quadricavatus (Gotz, 1952)
- Halolaelaps remanei Willmann, 1952
- Halolaelaps saproincisus Hirschmann, 1966
- Halolaelaps sculpturatus Sellnick, 1940
- Halolaelaps sexclavatus (Oudemans, 1902)
- Halolaelaps simplex Willmann, 1957
- Halolaelaps soemermaai (Karg, 1965)
- Halolaelaps strenzkei (Gotz, 1952)
- Halolaelaps subtilis (Leitner, 1946)
- Halolaelaps suecicus Sellnick, 1957
- Halolaelaps tuerkorum (Gotz, 1952)
- Halolaelaps vicinus (Gotz, 1952)
