= Saprosecans =

Scientific classification
- Kingdom: Animalia
- Phylum: Arthropoda
- Subphylum: Chelicerata
- Class: Arachnida
- Order: Mesostigmata
- Family: Halolaelapidae
- Genus: Saprosecans; Karg, 1964

Genus of mites

Saprosecans is a genus of mites in the family Halolaelapidae. There are at least two described species in Saprosecans.

== Species ==
These two species belong to the genus Saprosecans:

- Saprosecans baloghi Karg, 1964
- Saprosecans bialoviensis Gwiazdowicz, 2001
