= Trichoobscura =

Scientific classification
- Kingdom: Animalia
- Phylum: Arthropoda
- Subphylum: Chelicerata
- Class: Arachnida
- Order: Mesostigmata
- Genus: Trichoobscura; W. Hirschmann, 1986

Genus of mites

Trichoobscura is a genus of mites in the family Trematuridae.

== Species ==
- Trichoobscura arrhenodis (Vitzthum, 1921)
- Trichoobscura barbatula (Willmann, 1950)
- Trichoobscura bifurcata (Hirschmann & Wisniewski, 1986)
- Trichoobscura brunnei (Wisniewski & Michalski, 1984)
- Trichoobscura calcarata (Hirschmann & Zirngiebl-Nicol, 1961)
- Trichoobscura canadaobscura (Hirschmann, 1978)
- Trichoobscura dialveolata (Hirschmann & Zirngiebl-Nicol, 1961)
- Trichoobscura fallax (Vitzthum, 1926)
- Trichoobscura gabonensis (Wisniewski & Hirschmann, 1992)
- Trichoobscura granulata (Zirngiebl-Nicol, 1972)
- Trichoobscura ishikawai (Hiramatsu, 1979)
- Trichoobscura leucocelana (Wisniewski & Hirschmann, 1992)
- Trichoobscura mexicodialveolata (Hirschmann, 1978)
- Trichoobscura microcauponata (Hirschmann & Wisniewski, 1986)
- Trichoobscura obscura (C.L. Koch, 1836)
- Trichoobscura obscurasimilis (Hirschmann & Zirngiebl-Nicol, 1961)
- Trichoobscura pecinai (Hirschmann & Wisniewski, 1986)
- Trichoobscura perissopos (Hirschmann & Wisniewski, 1986)
- Trichoobscura posnaniensis (Hirschmann & Wisniewski, 1986)
- Trichoobscura punctata (Hirschmann & Zirngiebl-Nicol, 1961)
- Trichoobscura punctatasimilis (Hirschmann & Wisniewski, 1986)
- Trichoobscura rolniki (Wisniewski & Hirschmann, 1988)
- Trichoobscura santana (Hirschmann & Wisniewski, 1986)
- Trichoobscura schweizeri (Hirschmann, 1978)
- Trichoobscura sibirica (Wisniewski & Michalski, 1984)
- Trichoobscura solantei (Hirschmann & Hiramatsu, 1990)
- Trichoobscura szaboi (Hirschmann & Wisniewski, 1988)
