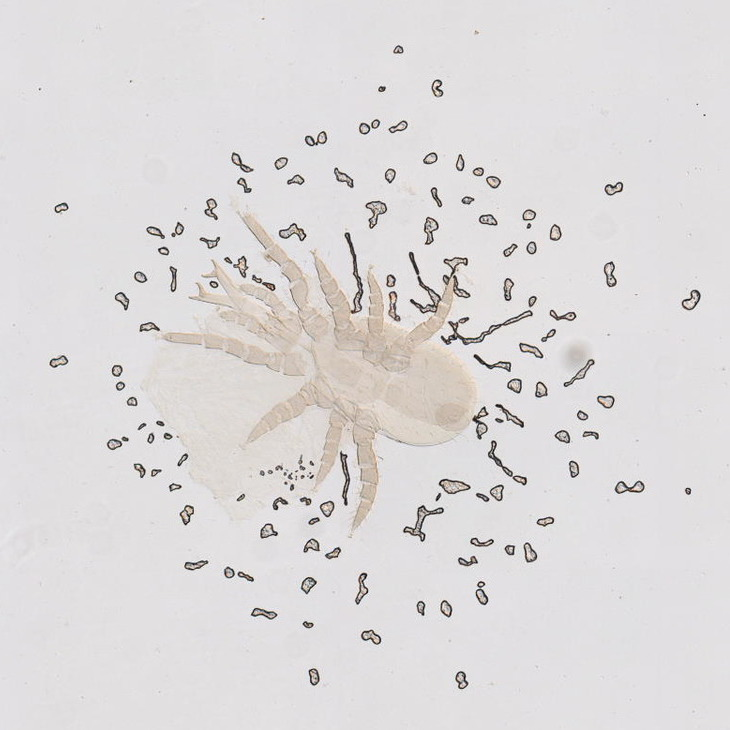

Scientific classification
- Kingdom: Animalia
- Phylum: Arthropoda
- Subphylum: Chelicerata
- Class: Arachnida
- Order: Mesostigmata
- Family: Halolaelapidae
- Genus: Halolaelaps
- Species: H. subtilis

Binomial name
- Halolaelaps subtilis (Leitner, 1946)

= Halolaelaps subtilis =

Species of mite

Halolaelaps subtilis is a species of mite in the family Halolaelapidae.
