= Halolaelaps nodosus =

Scientific classification
- Kingdom: Animalia
- Phylum: Arthropoda
- Subphylum: Chelicerata
- Class: Arachnida
- Order: Mesostigmata
- Family: Halolaelapidae
- Genus: Halolaelaps
- Species: H. nodosus

Binomial name
- Halolaelaps nodosus Berlese & Trouessart, 1889

Species of mite

Halolaelaps nodosus is a species of mite in the family Halolaelapidae.
