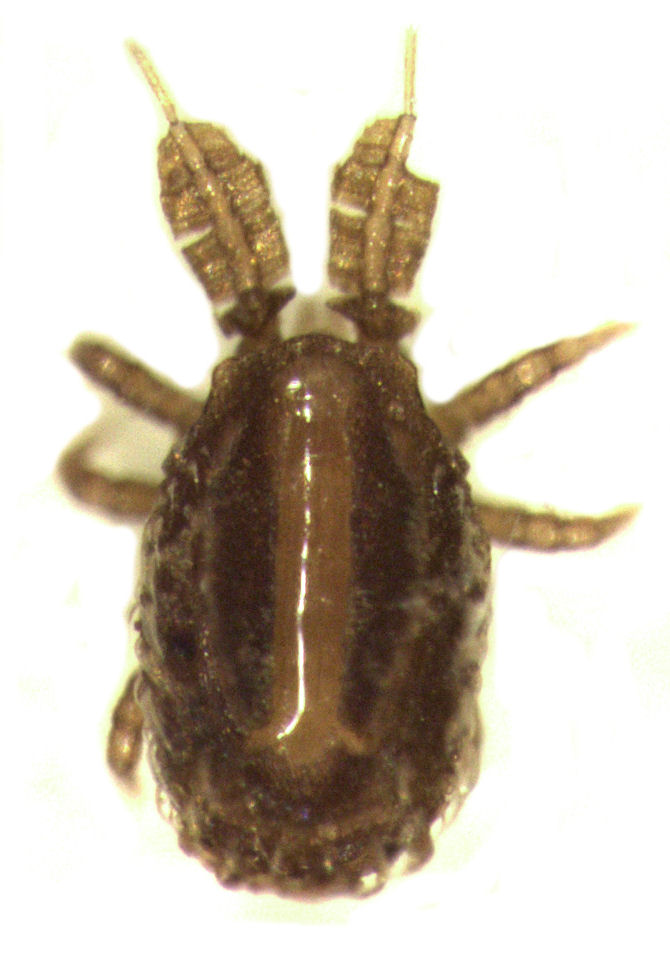
- Calotrachytes fimbriatipes

Scientific classification
- Domain: Eukaryota
- Kingdom: Animalia
- Phylum: Arthropoda
- Subphylum: Chelicerata
- Class: Arachnida
- Order: Mesostigmata
- Family: Polyaspididae
- Genus: Calotrachys; Berlese, 1916

= Calotrachys =

Genus of mites

Calotrachys is a genus of mites in the family Polyaspididae.
