= Ipiduropoda =

Scientific classification
- Kingdom: Animalia
- Phylum: Arthropoda
- Subphylum: Chelicerata
- Class: Arachnida
- Order: Mesostigmata
- Family: Trematuridae
- Genus: Ipiduropoda; Sellnick, 1952

Genus of mites

Ipiduropoda is a genus of mites in the family Trematuridae.

== Species ==
- Ipiduropoda angusta (Hirschmann & Wisniewski, 1986)
- Ipiduropoda australis (Hirschmann, 1972)
- Ipiduropoda californica (Wisniewski & Hirschmann, 1988)
- Ipiduropoda camerunis (Wisniewski, 1980)
- Ipiduropoda cornuimbergerensis (Hirschmann & Wisniewski, 1986)
- Ipiduropoda dalarnaensis (Hirschmann & Zirngiebl-Nicol, 1961)
- Ipiduropoda durangoensis (Hirschmann, 1978)
- Ipiduropoda galica (Hirschmann & Wisniewski, 1986)
- Ipiduropoda hondurasae (Hirschmann & Wisniewski, 1986)
- Ipiduropoda idahoensis (Hirschmann & Wisniewski, 1986)
- Ipiduropoda integra (Hirschmann, 1978)
- Ipiduropoda kielczewskii (Wisniewski, 1977)
- Ipiduropoda knoxvillensis (Hirschmann & Wisniewski, 1986)
- Ipiduropoda montanae (Hirschmann & Wisniewski, 1986)
- Ipiduropoda multipilis (Vitzthum, 1923)
- Ipiduropoda nevesi (Hirschmann & Wisniewski, 1986)
- Ipiduropoda polonica (Wisniewski & Hirschmann, 1988)
- Ipiduropoda polycanadiensis (Hirschmann, 1978)
- Ipiduropoda polycolumbiensis (Hirschmann, 1978)
- Ipiduropoda polyguatemalae (Hirschmann & Wisniewski, 1986)
- Ipiduropoda polymexicana (Hirschmann, 1978)
- Ipiduropoda polytricha (Vitzthum, 1923)
- Ipiduropoda polytrichasimilis (Hirschmann, 1972)
- Ipiduropoda tegucigalpae (Hirschmann & Wisniewski, 1986)
- Ipiduropoda wisniewskii (Hirschmann, 1978)
