= Saprosecans baloghi =

Scientific classification
- Kingdom: Animalia
- Phylum: Arthropoda
- Subphylum: Chelicerata
- Class: Arachnida
- Order: Mesostigmata
- Family: Halolaelapidae
- Genus: Saprosecans
- Species: S. baloghi

Binomial name
- Saprosecans baloghi Karg, 1964

Species of mite

Saprosecans baloghi is a species of mite in the family Halolaelapidae. It is found in Europe.
