= Saprosecans bialoviensis =

Scientific classification
- Kingdom: Animalia
- Phylum: Arthropoda
- Subphylum: Chelicerata
- Class: Arachnida
- Order: Mesostigmata
- Family: Halolaelapidae
- Genus: Saprosecans
- Species: S. bialoviensis

Binomial name
- Saprosecans bialoviensis Gwiazdowicz, 2001

Species of mite

Saprosecans bialoviensis is a species of mite in the family Halolaelapidae.
