= Austrodinychus =

Scientific classification
- Kingdom: Animalia
- Phylum: Arthropoda
- Class: Insecta
- Order: Diptera
- Family: Anthomyzidae
- Genus: Austrodinychus; Trägårdh, 1952

Genus of mites

Austrodinychus is a genus of mites in the family Nenteriidae.

== Species ==
- Austrodinychus brasiliensis (Wisniewski & Hirschmann, 1985)
- Austrodinychus canadiensis (Hirschmann, 1978)
- Austrodinychus catarinae (Wisniewski & Hirschmann, 1985)
- Austrodinychus chiapasus (Hirschmann, 1978)
- Austrodinychus cubanus (Wisniewski & Hirschmann, 1990)
- Austrodinychus diademata (Vitzthum, 1921)
- Austrodinychus fungivorus (Hirschmann, 1978)
- Austrodinychus ghanae (Hirschmann & Wisniewski, 1985)
- Austrodinychus guatemalae (Hirschmann & Wisniewski, 1985)
- Austrodinychus howdeni (Hirschmann, 1978)
- Austrodinychus makilingensis (Hirschmann & Hiramatsu, 1990)
- Austrodinychus martini (Hirschmann, 1978)
- Austrodinychus masculinatus (Vitzthum, 1935)
- Austrodinychus mexicanus (Hirschmann, 1978)
- Austrodinychus micronychus Trägårdh, 1952
- Austrodinychus moseri (Hirschmann, 1972)
- Austrodinychus obovata (Hirschmann & Wisniewski, 1985)
- Austrodinychus okumurai (Hiramatsu, 1979)
- Austrodinychus papuae (Hirschmann & Wisniewski, 1985)
- Austrodinychus ruizae (Hirschmann & Wisniewski, 1985)
- Austrodinychus sellnicki (Hirschmann & Wisniewski, 1985)
- Austrodinychus spumans (Hirschmann, 1972)
- Austrodinychus sturmi (Hirschmann & Wisniewski, 1985)
- Austrodinychus sumapazae (Hirschmann & Wisniewski, 1985)
- Austrodinychus tenuis (Hirschmann & Wisniewski, 1985)
- Austrodinychus yonaguniensis (Hiramatsu, 1980)
