= Halolaelaps sexclavatus =

Scientific classification
- Kingdom: Animalia
- Phylum: Arthropoda
- Subphylum: Chelicerata
- Class: Arachnida
- Order: Mesostigmata
- Family: Halolaelapidae
- Genus: Halolaelaps
- Species: H. sexclavatus

Binomial name
- Halolaelaps sexclavatus (Oudemans, 1902)

Species of mite

Halolaelaps sexclavatus is a species of mite in the family Halolaelapidae.
