= Halodarcia =

Scientific classification
- Kingdom: Animalia
- Phylum: Arthropoda
- Subphylum: Chelicerata
- Class: Arachnida
- Order: Mesostigmata
- Family: Halolaelapidae
- Genus: Halodarcia; Karg, 1969

Genus of mites

Halodarcia is a genus of mites in the family Halolaelapidae. As of now, four species have been described. Three of these species are found in Europe, while Halodarcia kargi is found in Asia.

The species within this genus are strictly associated with carabid beetles, with the species being specifically found beneath the host beetle's elytra (as opposed to mites of the family Histiostomatidae, which are found on the host beetle's body.)

== Species ==
These four species belong to the genus Halodarcia:

- Halodarcia incideta Karg, 1969
- Halodarcia porolata Karg, 1969
- Halodarcia carabidophila Evans and Fain, 1995
- Halodarcia kargi Nikolsky, 1982

=== Halodarcia incideta ===
Halodarcia incideta is a species of mite in the genus Halodarcia found in northern Germany and Poland.

=== Halodarcia porolata ===
Halodarcia porolata is a species of mite in the genus Halodarcia found near the Germany-Netherlands border.

=== Halodarcia carabidophila ===
Halodarcia carabidophila is a species of mite in the genus Halodarcia found in the floodplain regions of Ukraine and Belgium. It can be described as having 24 pairs of sectae, a median divided sternal shield, and a smooth tapering dorsal shield. This species is also noted for having well developed claws. As the name implies, H. carabidophila is found almost exclusively using carabids as a host.

=== Halodarcia kargi ===
Halodarcia kargi is a species of mite in the genus Halodarcia found within Northern Asia.
