= Nenteria =

Scientific classification
- Kingdom: Animalia
- Phylum: Arthropoda
- Subphylum: Chelicerata
- Class: Arachnida
- Order: Mesostigmata
- Family: Nenteriidae
- Genus: Nenteria; Oudemans, 1915

Genus of mites

Nenteria is a genus of mites in the family Nenteriidae.

== Species ==
- Nenteria africana Wisniewski & Hirschmann, 1993
- Nenteria americana Wisniewski & Hirschmann, 1993
- Nenteria anormalis Wisniewski & Hirschmann, 1986
- Nenteria australiensis Hirschmann & Hiramatsu, 1978
- Nenteria baloghi Hirschmann, 1973
- Nenteria bellissima Wisniewski & Hirschmann, 1988
- Nenteria breviperitremata Masan, 1999
- Nenteria cambodgeana Wisniewski & Hirschmann, 1993
- Nenteria camerunis Wisniewski & Hirschmann, 1990
- Nenteria crassa Hirschmann, 1985
- Nenteria floralis Karg, 1986
- Nenteria hexalis Karg, 1986
- Nenteria jilinensis Ma, 1998
- Nenteria kieviana Wisniewski & Hirschmann, 1993
- Nenteria lindquisti Hirschmann, 1978
- Nenteria maeandralis Hirschmann, 1985
- Nenteria magna Hirschmann, 1985
- Nenteria peruana Wisniewski & Hirschmann, 1993
- Nenteria pictor (Berlese, 1916)
- Nenteria porula Hirschmann, 1985
- Nenteria quasikashimensis Ma, 2000
- Nenteria rotunda Hirschmann, 1985
- Nenteria schizostructura Hirschmann, 1978
- Nenteria schusteri Hirschmann, 1972
- Nenteria sinica Ma, 1998
- Nenteria slovaca Masan, 1999
- Nenteria tropica (Oudemans, 1905)
- Nenteria tropicasimilis Hirschmann & Wisniewski, 1985
- Nenteria vietnamensis Hirschmann, 1981
