= Halolaelaps strenzkei =

Scientific classification
- Kingdom: Animalia
- Phylum: Arthropoda
- Subphylum: Chelicerata
- Class: Arachnida
- Order: Mesostigmata
- Family: Halolaelapidae
- Genus: Halolaelaps
- Species: H. strenzkei

Binomial name
- Halolaelaps strenzkei (Gotz, 1952)

Species of mite

Halolaelaps strenzkei is a species of mite in the family Halolaelapidae.
