= Trichofrondosa =

Scientific classification
- Kingdom: Animalia
- Phylum: Arthropoda
- Subphylum: Chelicerata
- Class: Arachnida
- Order: Mesostigmata
- Family: Trematuridae
- Genus: Trichofrondosa; W. Hirschmann, 1986

Genus of mites

Trichofrondosa is a genus of mites in the family Trematuridae.

== Species ==
- Trichofrondosa amazonasae (Hirschmann, 1986)
- Trichofrondosa frondosa (Hirschmann, 1972)
- Trichofrondosa guayaramerinensis (Hirschmann, 1986)
