= Halolaelaps marinus =

Scientific classification
- Kingdom: Animalia
- Phylum: Arthropoda
- Subphylum: Chelicerata
- Class: Arachnida
- Order: Mesostigmata
- Family: Halolaelapidae
- Genus: Halolaelaps
- Species: H. marinus

Binomial name
- Halolaelaps marinus (Brady, 1875)

Species of mite

Halolaelaps marinus is a species of mite in the family Halolaelapidae. It is found in Europe.
