= Cilliba =

Scientific classification
- Domain: Eukaryota
- Kingdom: Animalia
- Phylum: Arthropoda
- Subphylum: Chelicerata
- Class: Arachnida
- Order: Mesostigmata
- Family: Uropodidae
- Genus: Cilliba; Heyden, 1826

Genus of mites

Cilliba is a genus of tortoise mites in the family Uropodidae. There are more than 20 described species in Cilliba.

== Species ==
These 21 species belong to the genus Cilliba:

- Cilliba antennurelloides Lombardini, 1943
- Cilliba aplicata Vitzthum
- Cilliba athiasae (Hirschmann & Zirngiebl-Nicol, 1969)
- Cilliba cassidea (Hermann, 1804)
- Cilliba cassideasimilis
- Cilliba cassidoidea (Hirschmann & Zirngiebl-Nicol, 1969)
- Cilliba erlangensis Hirschmann & Zirngiebl-Nicol, 1969
- Cilliba eulaelaptis Vitzthum, 1930
- Cilliba foroliviensis Lombardini, 1961
- Cilliba franzi (Hirschmann & Zirngiebl-Nicol, 1969)
- Cilliba insularis
- Cilliba kleinei Vitzthum, 1921
- Cilliba malayica Vitzthum, 1921
- Cilliba permagna Vitzthum
- Cilliba rafalskii
- Cilliba regia Vitzthum, 1921
- Cilliba sellnicki (Hirschmann & Zirngiebl-Nicol, 1969)
- Cilliba stammeri (Hirschmann & Zirngiebl-Nicol, 1969)
- Cilliba translucida Vitzthum, 1921
- Cilliba tripliciterscutata Lombardini, 1943
- Cilliba woelkei (Hirschmann & Zirngiebl-Nicol, 1969)
