= Rotundabaloghia =

Scientific classification
- Domain: Eukaryota
- Kingdom: Animalia
- Phylum: Arthropoda
- Subphylum: Chelicerata
- Class: Arachnida
- Order: Mesostigmata
- Family: Uropodidae
- Genus: Rotundabaloghia; Hirschmann, 1975

Genus of mites

Rotundabaloghia is a genus of tortoise mites in the family Uropodidae. There are about 16 described species in Rotundabaloghia.

== Species ==
These 16 species belong to the genus Rotundabaloghia:

- Rotundabaloghia browni
- Rotundabaloghia bukavuensis
- Rotundabaloghia erinacea
- Rotundabaloghia ermilovi
- Rotundabaloghia hongkongensis Kontschán, 2015
- Rotundabaloghia iquitosensis Hirschmann, 1992
- Rotundabaloghia javaensis
- Rotundabaloghia kaydani
- Rotundabaloghia lindqvistiformis
- Rotundabaloghia magna Hirschmann, 1992
- Rotundabaloghia rwandae
- Rotundabaloghia singaporica Hirschmann, 1975
- Rotundabaloghia splendida
- Rotundabaloghia tobiasi Hirschmann, 1975
- Rotundabaloghia ukoguruensis
- Rotundabaloghia wangi
