= Dipolyaspis =

Scientific classification
- Domain: Eukaryota
- Kingdom: Animalia
- Phylum: Arthropoda
- Subphylum: Chelicerata
- Class: Arachnida
- Order: Mesostigmata
- Family: Polyaspididae
- Genus: Dipolyaspis; Berlese, 1917

Genus of mites

Dipolyaspis is a genus of mites in the family Polyaspididae.
