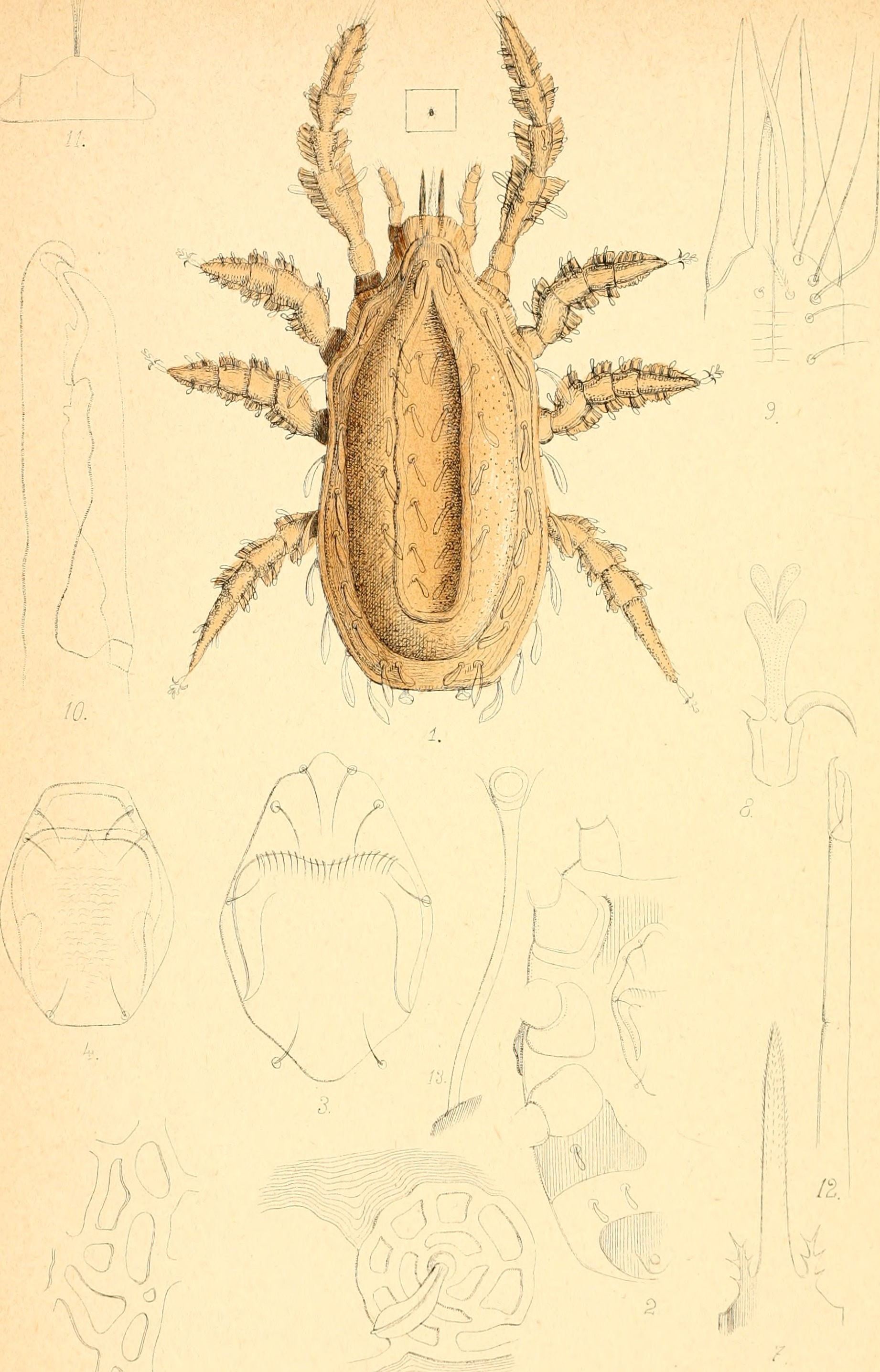
- Polyaspis patavinus

Scientific classification
- Kingdom: Animalia
- Phylum: Arthropoda
- Subphylum: Chelicerata
- Class: Arachnida
- Order: Mesostigmata
- Family: Polyaspididae
- Genus: Polyaspis; Berlese, 1881

= Polyaspis =

Genus of mites

Polyaspis is a genus of mites in the family Polyaspididae. There are about six described species in Polyaspis.

== Species ==
These six species belong to the genus Polyaspis:

- Polyaspis criocephali Wisniewski, 1980
- Polyaspis lamellipes Banks
- Polyaspis madagascarensis
- Polyaspis patavinus Berlese, 1881
- Polyaspis repandus Berlese, 1903
- Polyaspis sansonei Berlese, 1916
