= Dyscritaspis =

Scientific classification
- Domain: Eukaryota
- Kingdom: Animalia
- Phylum: Arthropoda
- Subphylum: Chelicerata
- Class: Arachnida
- Order: Mesostigmata
- Family: Polyaspididae
- Genus: Dyscritaspis; Camin, 1953
- Species: D. whartoni

Binomial name
- Dyscritaspis whartoni Camin, 1953

Genus of mites

Dyscritaspis is a genus of mites in the family Polyaspididae. There is at least one described species in Dyscritaspis, D. whartoni.
