= Polyaspinus =

Scientific classification
- Kingdom: Animalia
- Phylum: Arthropoda
- Subphylum: Chelicerata
- Class: Arachnida
- Order: Mesostigmata
- Family: Trachytidae
- Genus: Polyaspinus; Berlese, 1916

Genus of mites

Polyaspinus is a genus of mites in the family Trachytidae.

== Species ==
- Polyaspinus boliviensis Hirschmann, 1992
- Polyaspinus cylindricus Berlese, 1916
- Polyaspinus higginsi Camin, 1954
- Polyaspinus hutuae (Hiramatsu, 1982)
- Polyaspinus kovaci Masan & Kaluz, 1999
- Polyaspinus litoreus (Hiramatsu, 1980)
- Polyaspinus marihirschmanni (Hiramatsu, 1979)
- Polyaspinus nicolae Hirschmann, in Hirschmann & Wisniewski, 1992
- Polyaspinus quadrangularis Athias-Binche, 1980
- Polyaspinus schweizeri (Hutu, 1976)
- Polyaspinus tasmanicus Bloszyk & Halliday, 2000
- Polyaspinus tuberculatus Womersley, 1961
