= Pseudouropoda =

Scientific classification
- Kingdom: Animalia
- Phylum: Arthropoda
- Subphylum: Chelicerata
- Class: Arachnida
- Order: Mesostigmata
- Family: Uropodidae
- Genus: Pseudouropoda; Oudemans, 1936
- Species: P. breviunguiculata

Binomial name
- Pseudouropoda breviunguiculata Willmann, 1949

Genus of mites

Pseudouropoda is a genus of tortoise mites in the family Uropodidae. There is at least one described species in Pseudouropoda, P. breviunguiculata.
