= Leitneria pugio =

Scientific classification
- Kingdom: Animalia
- Phylum: Arthropoda
- Subphylum: Chelicerata
- Class: Arachnida
- Order: Mesostigmata
- Family: Halolaelapidae
- Genus: Leitneria
- Species: L. pugio

Binomial name
- Leitneria pugio (Karg, 1961)

Species of mite

Leitneria pugio is a species of mite in the family Halolaelapidae.
