= Uroactinia =

Scientific classification
- Missing taxonomy template (fix): Uroactinia

Genus of mites

Uroactinia is a genus of mites in the order Mesostigmata, placed in its own family, Uroactinidae.

== Species ==
- Uroactinia agitans (Banks, 1908)
- Uroactinia anchor (Trouessart, 1902)
- Uroactinia aquatica (Piersig, 1906)
- Uroactinia assamensis Hirschmann, 1990
- Uroactinia australiensis Hirschmann, 1990
- Uroactinia bermudaensis (Ewing, 1920)
- Uroactinia bicarinata (Trägårdh, 1931)
- Uroactinia brasiliensis (Berlese, 1903)
- Uroactinia brasiloides Hirschmann, 1990
- Uroactinia brevipila (Driel, Loots & Marais, 1977)
- Uroactinia brevipilaoides Hirschmann, 1990
- Uroactinia cavernicola (Hutzu, 1997)
- Uroactinia centroamericana (Stoll, 1893)
- Uroactinia cocosensis Hirschmann, 1990
- Uroactinia consanguinea (Berlese, 1905)
- Uroactinia coprophila Sellnick, 1958
- Uroactinia cubaensis Hirschmann, 1990
- Uroactinia daelei Hirschmann, 1981
- Uroactinia domrowi Hirschmann, 1990
- Uroactinia dracaena Hirschmann, 1990
- Uroactinia endroedyi Hirschmann, 1990
- Uroactinia franzi Hirschmann, 1990
- Uroactinia fusina Ma, 2003
- Uroactinia galapagosensis Hirschmann, 1990
- Uroactinia guineae Hirschmann, 1990
- Uroactinia hawaiiensis Hirschmann, 1990
- Uroactinia hippocrepea (Berlese, 1918)
- Uroactinia hippocrepoidea (Vitzthum, 1935)
- Uroactinia hiramatsui Hirschmann, 1990
- Uroactinia hirschmanni Hiramatsu, 1978
- Uroactinia kapangae Hirschmann, 1990
- Uroactinia kargi (Hirschmann, 1990)
- Uroactinia krantzi (Hirschmann, 1990)
- Uroactinia lukoschusi (Hirschmann, 1990)
- Uroactinia luluae Hirschmann, 1990
- Uroactinia luzonensis Hirschmann, 1990
- Uroactinia mira (Vitzthum, 1921)
- Uroactinia neotropica Hirschmann, 1990
- Uroactinia nidiphila Wisniewski & Hirschmann, 1983
- Uroactinia oblita Hirschmann, 1990
- Uroactinia okuensis Hirschmann, 1990
- Uroactinia ovata (Fox, 1948)
- Uroactinia peruensis Hirschmann, 1990
- Uroactinia philippinensis (Vitzthum, 1921)
- Uroactinia popocensis Hirschmann, 1990
- Uroactinia porosa Hirschmann, 1990
- Uroactinia rarosae Hiramatsu & Hirschmann in Hirschmann 1990
- Uroactinia sellnicki Hirschmann, 1990
- Uroactinia sellnickiagitans Hirschmann, 1990
- Uroactinia sellnickihippocrepea Hirschmann, 1990
- Uroactinia surinamensis Hirschmann, 1990
- Uroactinia traegardhi Sellnick, 1964
- Uroactinia vitzthumiconsanguinea Hirschmann, 1990
- Uroactinia vitzthumihippocrepea Hirschmann, 1990
- Uroactinia vitzthumimira Hirschmann, 1990
- Uroactinia wisniewskii Hirschmann, 1990
- Uroactinia woelkei (Hirschmann, 1990)
