= Uroseius =

Scientific classification
- Kingdom: Animalia
- Phylum: Arthropoda
- Subphylum: Chelicerata
- Class: Arachnida
- Order: Mesostigmata
- Family: Trachytidae
- Genus: Uroseius; Berlese, 1888

Genus of mites

Uroseius is a genus of mites in the family Trachytidae.

== Species ==
The genus comprises the following species:

- Uroseius acuminatus (C.L. Koch, 1847)
- Uroseius australianus (Canestrini, 1884)
- Uroseius baloghi Hirschmann, 1973
- Uroseius botswanensis Fain, 1998
- Uroseius brasiliensis Wisniewski & Hirschmann, 1993
- Uroseius castrii Hirschmann, 1973
- Uroseius chilensis Wisniewski & Hirschmann, 1992
- Uroseius costaricensis Fain, 1998
- Uroseius cylindricus (Berlese, 1916)
- Uroseius degeneratus Oudemans, 1913
- Uroseius disneyi Fain, 1998
- Uroseius dubiosus (Vitzthum, 1925)
- Uroseius elongatus (Kramer, 1876)
- Uroseius gaieri (Schweizer, 1961)
- Uroseius grootaerti Fain, 1998
- Uroseius hirschmanni Hiramatsu, 1977
- Uroseius hunzikeri Schweizer, 1922
- Uroseius inaequipunctatus (Stoll, 1886)
- Uroseius infirmus (Berlese, 1887)
- Uroseius jabae Berlese, 1910
- Uroseius koehleri Wisniewski, 1979
- Uroseius lagenaeformis (Berlese, 1904)
- Uroseius myrmecophilus Wisniewski, 1979
- Uroseius naganoensis Hiramatsu, 1979
- Uroseius ovatus Leonardi, 1897
- Uroseius peraphorus (Krantz & Ainscough, 1960)
- Uroseius philipsi Wisniewski & Hirschmann, 1993
- Uroseius phoridarum Fain, 1998
- Uroseius rhinebeckensis Wisniewski & Hirschmann, 1993
- Uroseius roleri Masan, 2001
- Uroseius rotundus Hiramatsu, 1981
- Uroseius sorrentinus (Lombardini, 1952)
- Uroseius traegardhi Hirschmann & Zirngiebl-Nicol, 1969
- Uroseius trogicolis Masan, 1999
- Uroseius tuberosus Hirschmann & Hiramatsu, 1977
- Uroseius turki Hirschmann, 1979
- Uroseius vitzthumi Hirschmann & Zirngiebl-Nicol, 1969
- Uroseius willmanni (Hirschmann & Zirngiebl-Nicol, 1969)
- Uroseius yoshidai Hiramatsu, 1982
