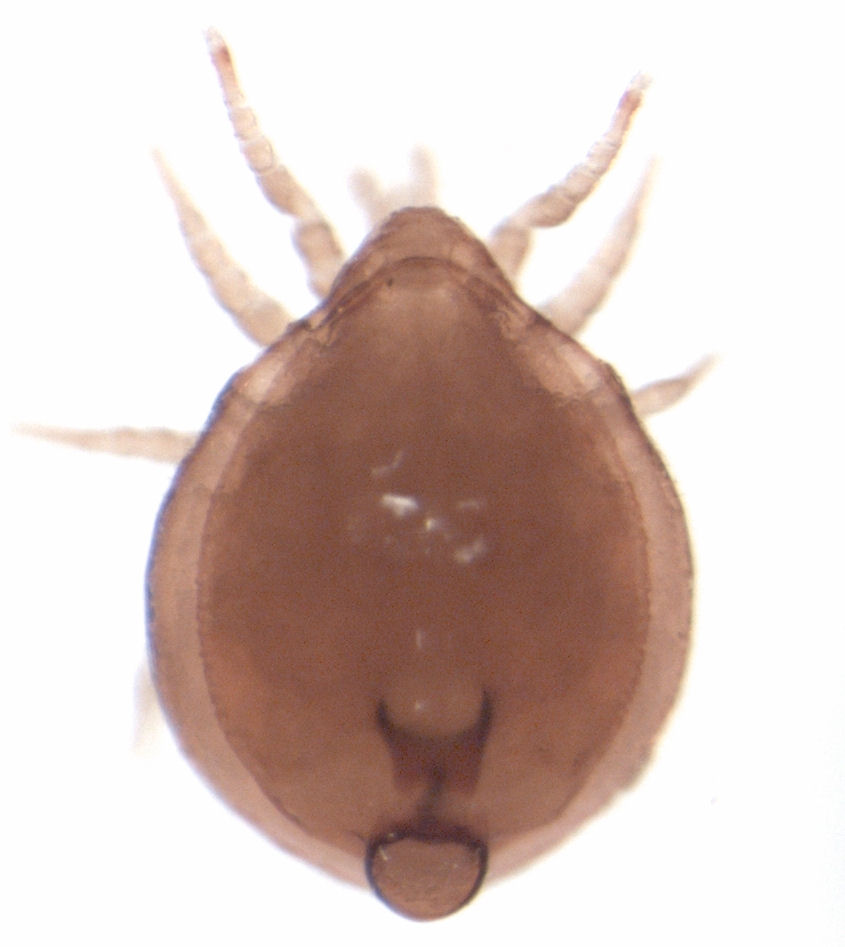
- Uropoda thorpei (dorsal)

Scientific classification
- Kingdom: Animalia
- Phylum: Arthropoda
- Subphylum: Chelicerata
- Class: Arachnida
- Order: Mesostigmata
- Family: Uropodidae
- Genus: Uropoda; Latreille, 1805

= Uropoda =

Genus of mites

Uropoda is a genus of tortoise mites in the family Uropodidae. There are more than 70 described species in Uropoda. The name come from Ancient Greek οὐρά (ourá), meaning 'tail', and πούς (poús), meaning 'foot'.

== Species ==
These 78 species belong to the genus Uropoda:

- Uropoda adfixa Vitzthum, 1921
- Uropoda admixta Vitzthum, 1921
- Uropoda alpina Berlese, 1904
- Uropoda amblyoponae Banks, 1916
- Uropoda anthropophagorum Vitzthum, 1921
- Uropoda apicata Banks, 1916
- Uropoda arrhenodis Vitzthum, 1920
- Uropoda austroasiatica Vitzthum, 1921 (Austroasiatic uropoda)
- Uropoda azteka Vitzthum, 1920
- Uropoda bengalica (Bengal uropoda)
- Uropoda berndti Wisniewski, 1984
- Uropoda bisetosa Banks
- Uropoda bistellaris Vitzthum, 1933
- Uropoda caenorychodis Vitzthum, 1921
- Uropoda clavisetosa Banks
- Uropoda convexifrons Banks, 1916
- Uropoda copridis (Oudemans, 1916)
- Uropoda debilior Vitzthum, 1925
- Uropoda diademata Vitzthum, 1920
- Uropoda distinguenda Berlese, 1903
- Uropoda dryocoetis Vitzthum, 1923
- Uropoda ecuadorica Kontschán, 2012 (Ecuadorian uropoda)
- Uropoda essigi Banks
- Uropoda fallax Vitzthum, 1926
- Uropoda febris Vitzthum, 1926
- Uropoda fraterna Banks, 1916
- Uropoda frontalis Banks
- Uropoda fumicola (Schweizer, 1961)
- Uropoda halberti Hirschmann, 1993
- Uropoda hirschmanni Hiramatsu, 1977 (Hirschmann's uropoda)
- Uropoda hispanica Hirschmann & Zirngiebl-Nicol, 1969
- Uropoda inflata (Berlese, 1916)
- Uropoda ingens Vitzthum, 1925
- Uropoda inhaerens Vitzthum, 1921
- Uropoda italica Hirschmann & Zirngiebl-Nicol, 1969 (Italian uropoda)
- Uropoda kargi Hirschmann & Zirngiebl-Nicol, 1969
- Uropoda karnai
- Uropoda lagena Berlese, 1882
- Uropoda lativentris Vitzthum, 1926
- Uropoda lawrencei (Lawrence's uropoda)
- Uropoda lichenicola
- Uropoda longifrons Banks, 1916
- Uropoda madagascariensis Vitzthum, 1921 (Malagasy uropoda)
- Uropoda masculinata Vitzthum, 1933
- Uropoda michaeliana Leonardi, 1896
- Uropoda michiganensis Vitzthum, 1926
- Uropoda minima Kramer, 1882
- Uropoda minor (Berlese, 1887)
- Uropoda mira Vitzthum, 1921
- Uropoda misella (Berlese, 1916)
- Uropoda obscura C.L.Koch
- Uropoda orbicularis (Mueller, 1776)
- Uropoda orychodis Vitzthum, 1920
- Uropoda parva (Schweizer, 1961)
- Uropoda philippinensis Vitzthum, 1920 (Philippine uropoda)
- Uropoda polygraphi Vitzthum, 1923
- Uropoda productior Berlese, 1916
- Uropoda promiscua Vitzthum, 1921
- Uropoda pulcherrima (Berlese, 1903)
- Uropoda replectus Berlese, 1904
- Uropoda repleta (Berlese, 1904)
- Uropoda scelerum Vitzthum, 1926
- Uropoda setata
- Uropoda simplex Berlese, 1903
- Uropoda spiculata
- Uropoda spinosula Kneissl, 1915
- Uropoda splendida Kramer, 1882
- Uropoda submarginata Banks, 1916
- Uropoda tarsale Rob.-Desvoidy, 1832
- Uropoda tasmanica Banks, 1916
- Uropoda thorpei Kontschán, 2012
- Uropoda transportabilis Vitzthum, 1921
- Uropoda trilobata Banks, 1916
- Uropoda turcica
- Uropoda uvaeformis Vitzthum, 1921
- Uropoda vegetans (De Geer, 1768)
- Uropoda wichmanni Vitzthum, 1923
- Uropoda willmanni Hirschmann & Zirngiebl-Nicol, 1969
