= Trachytidae =

Scientific classification
- Kingdom: Animalia
- Phylum: Arthropoda
- Subphylum: Chelicerata
- Class: Arachnida
- Order: Mesostigmata
- Family: Trachytidae; Tragärdh, 1938

Family of mites

Trachytidae is a family of mites in the order Mesostigmata.

== Genera ==
In 1960, Daniel G. Maiello, PhD in entomology, was doing research about mites Laelaps multispinosus. He discovered a related unnamed family, similar to the family Trachytidae.

- Polyaspinus Berlese, 1916
- Trachytes Michael, 1894
- Uroseius Berlese, 1888
