= Trichouropoda =

Scientific classification
- Kingdom: Animalia
- Phylum: Arthropoda
- Subphylum: Chelicerata
- Class: Arachnida
- Order: Mesostigmata
- Family: Trematuridae
- Genus: Trichouropoda; Berlese, 1916

Genus of mites

Trichouropoda is a genus of mites in the family Trematuridae.

== Species ==
- Trichouropoda abeokutana Hirschmann & Wisniewski, 1987
- Trichouropoda abercorni Hirschmann & Wisniewski, 1987
- Trichouropoda aculeata Hirschmann & Wisniewski, 1988
- Trichouropoda adfixa (Vitzthum, 1921)
- Trichouropoda adfixasimilis (Hirschmann & Wisniewski, 1986)
- Trichouropoda adjuncti Wisniewski & Hirschmann, in Hirschmann & Wisniewski 1988
- Trichouropoda admixta (Vitzthum, 1921)
- Trichouropoda afossalis Hirschmann & Wisniewski, 1987
- Trichouropoda afossalisimilis Hirschmann & Wisniewski, 1987
- Trichouropoda africana Wisniewski, 1980
- Trichouropoda alascae Hirschmann & Wisniewski, 1987
- Trichouropoda albertaserrata Hirschmann, 1978
- Trichouropoda alcachupasi Hiramatsu & Hirschmann, in Hirschmann & Wisniewski 1988
- Trichouropoda alfkeni (Oudemans, 1903)
- Trichouropoda altissima Hirschmann, 1978
- Trichouropoda alveolus (Athias-Binche, 1981)
- Trichouropoda amicorum Wisniewski & Hirschmann, 1992
- Trichouropoda amoena Hirschmann, 1972
- Trichouropoda anthribiphila Wisniewski & Hirschmann, in Hirschmann & Wisniewski 1988
- Trichouropoda anthropophagorum (Vitzthum, 1921)
- Trichouropoda aokii Hiramatsu, 1979
- Trichouropoda argentinae Wisniewski & Hirschmann, 1984
- Trichouropoda aschantiana Wisniewski & Hirschmann, in Hirschmann & Wisniewski 1988
- Trichouropoda asionis Hirschmann & Wisniewski, 1988
- Trichouropoda asoki Sarkar & Sanyal, 1999
- Trichouropoda astructura Hirschmann & Wisniewski, 1988
- Trichouropoda atlantica (Vitzthum, 1922)
- Trichouropoda austroasiatica (Vitzthum, 1921)
- Trichouropoda azteka (Vitzthum, 1921)
- Trichouropoda balazyi Wisniewski & Hirschmann, 1992
- Trichouropoda banaszaki Wisniewski & Hirschmann, in Hirschmann & Wisniewski 1988
- Trichouropoda bassusi Hirschmann & Wisniewski, 1987
- Trichouropoda beckwithi Wisniewski, 1980
- Trichouropoda bellatula Hiramatsu, 1977
- Trichouropoda bennigseni Wisniewski & Hirschmann, 1984
- Trichouropoda bifilis (Canestrini, 1888)
- Trichouropoda bipilis (Vitzthum, 1921)
- Trichouropoda boliviensis Hirschmann, 1978
- Trichouropoda bonansai Hirschmann, 1978
- Trichouropoda brasiliana Wisniewski & Hirschmann, 1992
- Trichouropoda buettneri Wisniewski & Hirschmann, in Hirschmann & Wisniewski 1988
- Trichouropoda caenorychodis (Vitzthum, 1921)
- Trichouropoda caesariata Hiramatsu, 1979
- Trichouropoda callosa Masan, 1999
- Trichouropoda campbelli Hirschmann, 1978
- Trichouropoda campomolendina (Berlese, 1887)
- Trichouropoda canadainterstructura Hirschmann, 1978
- Trichouropoda canadaovalis Hirschmann, 1978
- Trichouropoda canadatuberosa Hirschmann, 1978
- Trichouropoda canadensis (Berlese, 1904)
- Trichouropoda castrii Hirschmann, 1972
- Trichouropoda caucasica Wisniewski & Hirschmann, in Hirschmann & Wisniewski 1988
- Trichouropoda centauri Wisniewski & Hirschmann, 1984
- Trichouropoda cepae Hirschmann & Wisniewski, 1987
- Trichouropoda ceylonensis Hirschmann & Wisniewski, 1988
- Trichouropoda chiapasa Hirschmann, 1978
- Trichouropoda chilica Hirschmann & Wisniewski, 1987
- Trichouropoda chmielewskii Hirschmann & Wisniewski, 1986
- Trichouropoda cienfuegi Wisniewski & Hirschmann, in Hirschmann & Wisniewski 1988
- Trichouropoda clatrata Hirschmann & Wisniewski, 1988
- Trichouropoda cocosensis Hirschmann & Wisniewski, 1988
- Trichouropoda columbiaovalis Hirschmann, 1978
- Trichouropoda columbiaserrata Hirschmann, 1978
- Trichouropoda columbiensis Wisniewski & Hirschmann, 1993
- Trichouropoda concinna (Trouessart, 1902)
- Trichouropoda confundibilis (Vitzthum, 1921)
- Trichouropoda congoensis Hirschmann & Hiramatsu, 1977
- Trichouropoda coprophila Wisniewski & Hirschmann, in Hirschmann & Wisniewski 1988
- Trichouropoda costai Hirschmann, 1972
- Trichouropoda cribricollis Hirschmann & Wisniewski, 1987
- Trichouropoda cubana Hutu, 1977
- Trichouropoda curiosa Wisniewski & Hirschmann, in Hirschmann & Wisniewski 1988
- Trichouropoda curtipilis Wisniewski & Hirschmann, in Hirschmann & Wisniewski 1988
- Trichouropoda daelei Hirschmann, 1981
- Trichouropoda davidovae Wisniewski & Hirschmann, 1992
- Trichouropoda denticulata Hirschmann, 1972
- Trichouropoda denticulatasimilis Hirschmann & Wisniewski, 1987
- Trichouropoda derosa (Vitzthum, 1921)
- Trichouropoda dimidiata Hirschmann & Wisniewski, 1987
- Trichouropoda ditricha Hirschmann & Wisniewski, 1987
- Trichouropoda ditrichasimilis Hirschmann & Wisniewski, 1987
- Trichouropoda dutkai Hirschmann & Wisniewski, 1987
- Trichouropoda eichleri Hirschmann & Wisniewski, 1987
- Trichouropoda elegans (Kramer, 1882)
- Trichouropoda elegantissima Hirschmann, 1978
- Trichouropoda ellipsoides Hirschmann & Wisniewski, 1988
- Trichouropoda elliptica Hirschmann & Wisniewski, 1988
- Trichouropoda endroedyi Hirschmann & Wisniewski, 1986
- Trichouropoda endroedyioides Hirschmann & Wisniewski, 1986
- Trichouropoda erevaniana Hirschmann & Wisniewski, 1986
- Trichouropoda euchaeta Hirschmann & Wisniewski, 1986
- Trichouropoda eumeandralis Hirschmann & Wisniewski, 1987
- Trichouropoda faber (Berlese, 1916)
- Trichouropoda faini Hirschmann & Wisniewski, 1988
- Trichouropoda falconis Hirschmann & Wisniewski, 1988
- Trichouropoda febris (Vitzthum, 1926)
- Trichouropoda fodori Hirschmann & Wisniewski, 1986
- Trichouropoda fruhstorferi Wisniewski & Hirschmann, in Hirschmann & Wisniewski 1988
- Trichouropoda fumiakii Hiramatsu, 1978
- Trichouropoda fungivora Hirschmann, 1978
- Trichouropoda galapagosensis Hirschmann & Wisniewski, 1988
- Trichouropoda ghanajavensis Hirschmann & Wisniewski, 1988
- Trichouropoda gigantea Hirschmann & Wisniewski, 1988
- Trichouropoda grandjeani Hirschmann, 1972
- Trichouropoda guanabarae Hirschmann & Wisniewski, 1987
- Trichouropoda guanophila Hirschmann & Wisniewski, 1988
- Trichouropoda guatemalensis Hirschmann, 1972
- Trichouropoda hayashii Hiramatsu, 1979
- Trichouropoda hejianguoi Ma, 2003
- Trichouropoda heteromunroi Hirschmann & Wisniewski, 1987
- Trichouropoda heterotricha Hirschmann & Wisniewski, 1987
- Trichouropoda hieroglyphica (Berlese, 1916)
- Trichouropoda hildegardae Wisniewski & Hirschmann, 1984
- Trichouropoda hiramatsui Hirschmann, in Hirschmann & Wisniewski 1988
- Trichouropoda hirschmanni Feider & Hutu, 1972
- Trichouropoda hirsuta Hirschmann, 1972
- Trichouropoda hisamatsui Hiramatsu, 1979
- Trichouropoda hispanica Hirschmann & Zirngiebl-Nicol, 1961
- Trichouropoda hormoceri Hirschmann & Wisniewski, 1986
- Trichouropoda hypopoides (Berlese, 1888)
- Trichouropoda iberica Hirschmann & Wisniewski, 1987
- Trichouropoda indragiriensis Hirschmann & Wisniewski, 1987
- Trichouropoda interstructura Hirschmann & Zirngiebl-Nicol, 1961
- Trichouropoda ishiharai Hiramatsu, 1979
- Trichouropoda israelensis Hirschmann, 1978
- Trichouropoda jacksonia (Hughes, 1948)
- Trichouropoda janeti (Berlese, 1904)
- Trichouropoda javensis (Oudemans, 1901)
- Trichouropoda jeanneli (André, 1945)
- Trichouropoda jelineki Wisniewski & Hirschmann, 1993
- Trichouropoda karacholana Wisniewski & Hirschmann, 1992
- Trichouropoda karawaiewi (Berlese, 1904)
- Trichouropoda kaseseensis Hirschmann & Wisniewski, 1986
- Trichouropoda kaszabi Hirschmann, 1978
- Trichouropoda kaszabisimilis Hirschmann, 1980
- Trichouropoda krantzi Hirschmann, 1975
- Trichouropoda kryptopoda Hirschmann & Wisniewski, 1988
- Trichouropoda laevis Wisniewski & Hirschmann, 1992
- Trichouropoda lagenaeformis Hirschmann & Wisniewski, 1988
- Trichouropoda lagunae Hiramatsu & Hirschmann, in Hirschmann & Wisniewski 1988
- Trichouropoda lamellosa (Hirschmann, 1972)
- Trichouropoda latina (Berlese, 1916)
- Trichouropoda lativentris (Vitzthum, 1926)
- Trichouropoda laudata Wisniewski & Hirschmann, 1988
- Trichouropoda leoniana Wisniewski & Hirschmann, in Hirschmann & Wisniewski 1988
- Trichouropoda levisetosa (Oudemans & Voigts, 1904)
- Trichouropoda lindquisti Hirschmann, 1978
- Trichouropoda lindquistisimilis Hirschmann, 1978
- Trichouropoda linguaeformis Hirschmann & Wisniewski, 1988
- Trichouropoda livorniana Wisniewski & Hirschmann, in Hirschmann & Wisniewski 1988
- Trichouropoda loksai Hirschmann, 1972
- Trichouropoda lokuschusi Hirschmann & Wisniewski, 1988
- Trichouropoda longiovalis (Hirschmann & Zirngiebl-Nicol, 1961)
- Trichouropoda longiseta (Berlese, 1888)
- Trichouropoda longitarsalis Hirschmann, 1972
- Trichouropoda louellae Hirschmann & Wisniewski, 1988
- Trichouropoda lukoschusi Hirschmann & Wisniewski, 1988
- Trichouropoda macrochaeta Feider & Hutu, 1972
- Trichouropoda macropi (Berlese, 1916)
- Trichouropoda madagascariensis (Vitzthum, 1921)
- Trichouropoda maeandralis Hirschmann, 1978
- Trichouropoda magdalenae Wisniewski & Hirschmann, in Hirschmann & Wisniewski 1988
- Trichouropoda magnaporula Hirschmann & Wisniewski, 1986
- Trichouropoda mahunkai Hirschmann & Wisniewski, 1988
- Trichouropoda malgascensis Hirschmann & Wisniewski, 1986
- Trichouropoda mallodoni Wisniewski, 1980
- Trichouropoda manaosiana Hirschmann & Wisniewski, 1986
- Trichouropoda marginalis Wisniewski & Hirschmann, 1992
- Trichouropoda martini Hirschmann, 1978
- Trichouropoda mazatlani Hirschmann, 1978
- Trichouropoda meandralis Hirschmann, 1978
- Trichouropoda meixneri Wisniewski & Hirschmann, in Hirschmann & Wisniewski 1988
- Trichouropoda melitommae Hirschmann & Wisniewski, 1988
- Trichouropoda meruensis Hirschmann & Wisniewski, 1987
- Trichouropoda mexicoovalis Hirschmann, 1978
- Trichouropoda microporosa Wisniewski & Hirschmann, 1992
- Trichouropoda microtricha Wisniewski & Hirschmann, in Hirschmann & Wisniewski 1988
- Trichouropoda minuta Wisniewski & Hirschmann, in Hirschmann & Wisniewski 1988
- Trichouropoda mirabilis Hirschmann, in Hirschmann & Wisniewski 1988
- Trichouropoda moldavica Hutu, 1972
- Trichouropoda monserratensis Hirschmann & Wisniewski, 1987
- Trichouropoda montezumae Hirschmann & Wisniewski, 1987
- Trichouropoda moseri Hirschmann, 1972
- Trichouropoda munroi Ryke, 1958
- Trichouropoda nagasakiensis Hiramatsu, 1979
- Trichouropoda nartana Wisniewski & Hirschmann, 1992
- Trichouropoda navicularum Hirschmann & Wisniewski, 1988
- Trichouropoda neomoseri Hirschmann & Wisniewski, 1987
- Trichouropoda nigella Hiramatsu, 1976
- Trichouropoda nigeriana Wisniewski & Hirschmann, in Hirschmann & Wisniewski 1988
- Trichouropoda nodulosa Wisniewski & Hirschmann, 1992
- Trichouropoda norimbergensis Hirschmann & Zirngiebl-Nicol, 1969
- Trichouropoda oblita Hirschmann & Wisniewski, 1987
- Trichouropoda octopilosa Hiramatsu & Hirschmann, in Hirschmann & Wisniewski 1988
- Trichouropoda oculata Hirschmann & Wisniewski, 1986
- Trichouropoda odamiyamaensis Hirschmann & Hiramatsu, in Hirschmann & Wisniewski 1986
- Trichouropoda ontarioovalis Hirschmann, 1978
- Trichouropoda oraniensis Hirschmann & Wisniewski, 1988
- Trichouropoda orbicularis (C.L. Koch, 1839)
- Trichouropoda orbimexicana Hirschmann, 1978
- Trichouropoda orszaghi Masan, 1999
- Trichouropoda orychodioides Wisniewski & Hirschmann, in Hirschmann & Wisniewski 1988
- Trichouropoda orychodis (Vitzthum, 1921)
- Trichouropoda oryctophila Hirschmann & Wisniewski, 1988
- Trichouropoda osiana Hirschmann & Wisniewski, 1987
- Trichouropoda ovalis (C.L.Koch, 1839)
- Trichouropoda ovalispatulifera Hirschmann, 1980
- Trichouropoda ovalistreati Hirschmann, 1980
- Trichouropoda overlaeti Hirschmann & Wisniewski, 1988
- Trichouropoda palawanensis Hirschmann & Hiramatsu, 1990
- Trichouropoda pallida (Ewing, 1909)
- Trichouropoda papuaeovalis Hirschmann & Wisniewski, 1986
- Trichouropoda parasítica (Choudhuri & Mukherjee, 1964)
- Trichouropoda parisiana Hirschmann & Wisniewski, 1987
- Trichouropoda patavina (G. Canestrini, 1885)
- Trichouropoda paucistructura Hirschmann & Wisniewski, 1987
- Trichouropoda pawlowskii Wisniewski & Hirschmann, 1992
- Trichouropoda pecinaituberosa Hirschmann & Wisniewski, 1987
- Trichouropoda penicillata Hirschmann & Zirngiebl-Nicol, 1961
- Trichouropoda perforata (Lombardini, 1928)
- Trichouropoda perforatoides Wisniewski & Hirschmann, 1993
- Trichouropoda peritrematalis (Hirschmann, 1972)
- Trichouropoda perrotunda Hirschmann & Wisniewski, 1988
- Trichouropoda peruana Wisniewski & Hirschmann, 1992
- Trichouropoda philippinojavensis Hirschmann & Wisniewski, 1988
- Trichouropoda pilifera Wisniewski & Hirschmann, 1994
- Trichouropoda pinevillensis Hirschmann & Wisniewski, 1988
- Trichouropoda pinicola Hirschmann & Wisniewski, 1986
- Trichouropoda pityophthori Hirschmann, 1978
- Trichouropoda plana (Sellnick, 1931)
- Trichouropoda platygeniaphila Hirschmann & Wisniewski, 1986
- Trichouropoda plaumanni Hirschmann & Wisniewski, 1988
- Trichouropoda plutoni Hirschmann & Wisniewski, 1987
- Trichouropoda pocsi Hirschmann & Wisniewski, 1987
- Trichouropoda polyctenaphila Hirschmann & Wisniewski, 1986
- Trichouropoda polygraphi (Vitzthum, 1923)
- Trichouropoda polypori Hirschmann, 1978
- Trichouropoda polysetosa Masan, 1999
- Trichouropoda popoensis Hirschmann & Wisniewski, 1987
- Trichouropoda porosa Wisniewski & Hirschmann, in Hirschmann & Wisniewski 1988
- Trichouropoda portugalensis Hirschmann & Wisniewski, 1986
- Trichouropoda praeacuta (Fox, 1948)
- Trichouropoda pretseae Hirschmann & Wisniewski, 1986
- Trichouropoda primitiva Hirschmann & Wisniewski, 1988
- Trichouropoda promiscus (Vitzthum, 1921)
- Trichouropoda proteramoceri Wisniewski & Hirschmann, 1993
- Trichouropoda pseudohildegardae Hirschmann & Wisniewski, 1988
- Trichouropoda punctatissima (Halbert, 1915)
- Trichouropoda quadritricha Hirschmann & Wisniewski, 1988
- Trichouropoda quadritrichasimilis Hirschmann & Wisniewski, 1988
- Trichouropoda querceti Hirschmann, 1972
- Trichouropoda quinquemontana Hirschmann & Wisniewski, 1988
- Trichouropoda rackae Hirschmann, 1975
- Trichouropoda radiosa Hirschmann & Wisniewski, 1987
- Trichouropoda rafalskii Wisniewski & Hirschmann, 1984
- Trichouropoda rarosi Hiramatsu & Hirschmann, in Hirschmann & Wisniewski 1988
- Trichouropoda reticulata Hirschmann & Wisniewski, 1988
- Trichouropoda romanica Feider & Hutu, 1972
- Trichouropoda rotunda Hirschmann & Wisniewski, 1988
- Trichouropoda ruehmi Hirschmann, 1972
- Trichouropoda ruehmisimilis Hirschmann & Wisniewski, 1987
- Trichouropoda rufipennis Hirschmann, 1978
- Trichouropoda rugosa Hirschmann & Wisniewski, 1987
- Trichouropoda ruizae Hirschmann & Wisniewski, 1987
- Trichouropoda sakaii Hiramatsu, 1979
- Trichouropoda salinasi Hiramatsu & Hirschmann, in Hirschmann & Wisniewski 1988
- Trichouropoda saltoensis Hirschmann, 1978
- Trichouropoda santantoniensis Wisniewski & Hirschmann, 1992
- Trichouropoda saopauli Wisniewski & Hirschmann, 1993
- Trichouropoda sardensis Hirschmann & Zirngiebl-Nicol, 1961
- Trichouropoda saturni Wisniewski & Hirschmann, 1980
- Trichouropoda schreiberi Valle, 1951
- Trichouropoda sculpturata Wisniewski & Hirschmann, in Hirschmann & Wisniewski 1988
- Trichouropoda sellnicki Hirschmann & Zirngiebl-Nicol, 1969
- Trichouropoda sellnickioides Wisniewski & Hirschmann, in Hirschmann & Wisniewski 1988
- Trichouropoda serrata Hirschmann & Zirngiebl-Nicol, 1961
- Trichouropoda serratasimilis Hirschmann, 1978
- Trichouropoda sertarum Hirschmann & Wisniewski, 1987
- Trichouropoda sertulaeformis Hirschmann & Wisniewski, 1987
- Trichouropoda shcherbakae Hirschmann, 1972
- Trichouropoda silesiana Wisniewski & Hirschmann, 1992
- Trichouropoda similibipilis Hirschmann, 1972
- Trichouropoda similijavensis Hiramatsu & Hirschmann, 1979
- Trichouropoda simpla (Fox, 1948)
- Trichouropoda sociata (Vitzthum, 1923)
- Trichouropoda solaris Hirschmann, 1972
- Trichouropoda solarissima Hirschmann, 1978
- Trichouropoda solmani Wisniewski & Hirschmann, 1992
- Trichouropoda somersetana Hirschmann & Wisniewski, 1987
- Trichouropoda spatulifera (Moniez, 1892)
- Trichouropoda spickaovalis Hirschmann & Wisniewski, 1986
- Trichouropoda stammeri Hirschmann & Zirngiebl-Nicol, 1969
- Trichouropoda stammerisimilis Hirschmann, 1978
- Trichouropoda steirastomae Hirschmann & Wisniewski, 1986
- Trichouropoda stercoraria Hirschmann & Hiramatsu, 1990
- Trichouropoda stolinai Wisniewski & Hirschmann, 1992
- Trichouropoda structura Hirschmann & Zirngiebl-Nicol, 1961
- Trichouropoda sturmi Hirschmann & Wisniewski, 1987
- Trichouropoda sturmisimilis Hirschmann & Wisniewski, 1987
- Trichouropoda sumapazae Hirschmann & Wisniewski, 1987
- Trichouropoda sumatrensis Hirschmann & Wisniewski, 1986
- Trichouropoda svatoni Masan, 2001
- Trichouropoda swietokrzyskii Hirschmann & Wisniewski, 1987
- Trichouropoda szczecinensis Hirschmann & Wisniewski, 1986
- Trichouropoda szunyeghyi Hirschmann, 1980
- Trichouropoda tanzaniae Wisniewski & Hirschmann, 1984
- Trichouropoda taraxidi Hirschmann & Wisniewski, 1987
- Trichouropoda tchadensis Wisniewski & Hirschmann, 1993
- Trichouropoda terrosa (Berlese, 1916)
- Trichouropoda testudo (Trägårdh, 1908)
- Trichouropoda tokunoshimaensis Hiramatsu, 1979
- Trichouropoda tonkini Hirschmann & Wisniewski, 1986
- Trichouropoda transportabilis (Vitzthum, 1921)
- Trichouropoda trapezoides Hirschmann & Wisniewski, 1987
- Trichouropoda treati Hirschmann, 1980
- Trichouropoda trichomexicana Hirschmann, 1978
- Trichouropoda tuberculata Hirschmann & Wisniewski, 1988
- Trichouropoda tuberosa Hirschmann & Zirngiebl-Nicol, 1961
- Trichouropoda tuberosasimilis Hirschmann & Wisniewski, 1987
- Trichouropoda tunesiae Hirschmann & Wisniewski, 1988
- Trichouropoda turbulenta Hirschmann & Wisniewski, 1987
- Trichouropoda tuvana Wisniewski & Hirschmann, 1992
- Trichouropoda uroseioides Hirschmann & Wisniewski, 1987
- Trichouropoda urospinoidea Hirschmann & Zirngiebl-Nicol, 1961
- Trichouropoda usaramoensis Hirschmann & Wisniewski, 1986
- Trichouropoda ustkuti Wisniewski & Michalski, 1984
- Trichouropoda usumburae Wisniewski & Hirschmann, 1984
- Trichouropoda utahensis Hirschmann & Wisniewski, 1987
- Trichouropoda utsuki Wisniewski & Michalski, 1984
- Trichouropoda uvaeformis (Vitzthum, 1921)
- Trichouropoda uvsnuurensis Wisniewski & Hirschmann, 1992
- Trichouropoda vanderhammeni Hirschmann & Ztrngiebl-Nicol, 1969
- Trichouropoda vanna (Lombardini, 1928)
- Trichouropoda vannaoides Hirschmann, 1978
- Trichouropoda variseta Wisniewski & Hirschmann, in Hirschmann & Wisniewski 1988
- Trichouropoda vietnamcamerunis Hirschmann & Wisniewski, 1988
- Trichouropoda vietnamensis Hirschmann, 1980
- Trichouropoda vitzthumilongiseta Hirschmann & Wisniewski, 1987
- Trichouropoda vulpina (Berlese, 1888)
- Trichouropoda wagneri (Oudemans, 1902)
- Trichouropoda wakei Hiramatsu, 1979
- Trichouropoda wilkinsoni Hirschmann & Wisniewski, 1986
- Trichouropoda woelkei Hirschmann & Wisniewski, 1988
- Trichouropoda wojtusiaki Hirschmann & Wisniewski, 1987
- Trichouropoda yamamotoi Hiramatsu & Hirschmann, in Hirschmann & Wisniewski 1988
- Trichouropoda zairensis Hirschmann & Wisniewski, 1988
- Trichouropoda zambiae Hirschmann & Wisniewski, 1987
- Trichouropoda zangi Wisniewski & Hirschmann, in Hirschmann & Wisniewski 1988
- Trichouropoda zeamays Hirschmann & Wisniewski, 1987
- Trichouropoda zikani (Sellnick, 1926)
- Trichouropoda zocchü (Lombardini, 1962)
