= Trachyte Creek =

Stream in Garfield County, Utah, U.S.

Coordinates: 37.8099888°N 110.4565306°W

Trachyte Creek is a stream in Garfield County, Utah, United States.

The creek was named from the boulders resembling trachyte lining the creek.

== See also ==
- List of rivers of Utah
