= Trachytes (mite) =

Scientific classification
- Kingdom: Animalia
- Phylum: Arthropoda
- Subphylum: Chelicerata
- Class: Arachnida
- Order: Mesostigmata
- Family: Trachytidae
- Genus: Trachytes; Michael, 1894

Genus of mites

Trachytes is a genus of mites in the family Trachytidae.

== Species ==
The following species are part of the genus Trachytes:

- Trachytes adrianaea Hutu, 2000
- Trachytes aegrota (C.L.Koch, 1841)
- Trachytes aegrotasimilis Hutu, 2001
- Trachytes aokii Hiramatsu, 1979
- Trachytes arcuatus Hirschmann & Zirngiebl-Nicol, 1969
- Trachytes augusta Hutu, 2000
- Trachytes balazyi Wisniewski & Hirschmann, 1994
- Trachytes baloghi Hirschmann & Zirngiebl-Nicol, 1969
- Trachytes canadiensis Hutu, 2001
- Trachytes decui Hutu, 1983
- Trachytes edleri Hutu, 1983
- Trachytes elegans Hirschmann & Zirngiebl-Nicol, 1969
- Trachytes eustructura Hirschmann & Zirngiebl-Nicol, 1969
- Trachytes hiramatsui Hutu, 1983
- Trachytes hirschmanni Hutu, 1973
- Trachytes hokkaidoensis Hiramatsu, 1980
- Trachytes inermis Trägårdh, 1910
- Trachytes irenae Pecina, 1970
- Trachytes jilinensis Ma, 2001
- Trachytes kaliszewskii Bloszyk & Szymkowiak, 1996
- Trachytes krantzi Hutu, 2001
- Trachytes lambda Berlese, 1904
- Trachytes lindquisti Hutu, 2001
- Trachytes marilynae Hutu, 2001
- Trachytes micropunctata Hutu, 1973
- Trachytes minima Trägårdh, 1910
- Trachytes minimasimilis Masan, 1999
- Trachytes montana Willmann, 1953
- Trachytes mystacinus Berlese, 1910
- Trachytes nortoni Hutu, 2001
- Trachytes onishii Hiramatsu, 1980
- Trachytes oudemansi Hirschmann & Zirngiebl-Nicol, 1969
- Trachytes pauperior Berlese, 1914
- Trachytes pecinai Hutu, 1983
- Trachytes pi Berlese, 1910
- Trachytes romanica Hutu, 1983
- Trachytes splendida Hutu, 1973
- Trachytes stammeni Hirschmann & Zirngiebl-Nicol, 1969
- Trachytes tesquorum Pecina, 1980
- Trachytes traegardhi Hirschmann & Zirngiebl-Nicol, 1969
- Trachytes tuberifer Berlese, 1914
- Trachytes welbourni Moraza, 1989
- Trachytes wisniewskii Hutu, 1983
- Trachytes yinsuigongi Ma, 2001
