= Trematuridae =

Trematuridae Temporal range: Palaeogene–present

Scientific classification
- Kingdom: Animalia
- Phylum: Arthropoda
- Subphylum: Chelicerata
- Class: Arachnida
- Order: Mesostigmata
- Family: Trematuridae; Berlese, 1917

Family of mites

Trematuridae is a family of mites in the order Mesostigmata.

== Genera ==
- Ipiduropoda Sellnick, 1952
- Trematuroides Cooreman, 1960
- Trichofrondosa W. Hirschmann, 1986
- Trichoobscura W. Hirschmann, 1986
- Trichouropoda Berlese, 1916
