= Werner Hirschmann =

German acarologist

- Born: 14 November 1921; Fürth
- Died: 10 September 1993 (aged 71)
- Scientific career
- Fields: Acarology
- Author abbrev. (zoology): Hirschmann

Werner Hirschmann (1921 - 1993) was a German acarologist (zoologist specializing in mites).

In 1951 he earned a doctorate from the University of Erlangen, with the thesis: "Subcorticale Parasitiformes und die Gattung Digamasellus Berlese 1905", but like many German acarologists, he earned a living as a high school biology teacher.

He described over 1400 taxa, but his methods of defining mite genera have not always been accepted.

== Names published ==
See Category:Taxa named by Werner Hirschmann

== Publications ==
(incomplete)

== Honours ==
=== Eponymous taxa ===
- Wernerhirschmannia (a mite genus)
- Hutufeideria hirschmannisimilis
- Hutufeideria hirschmannoides
- Hutufeideria hirschmanni
