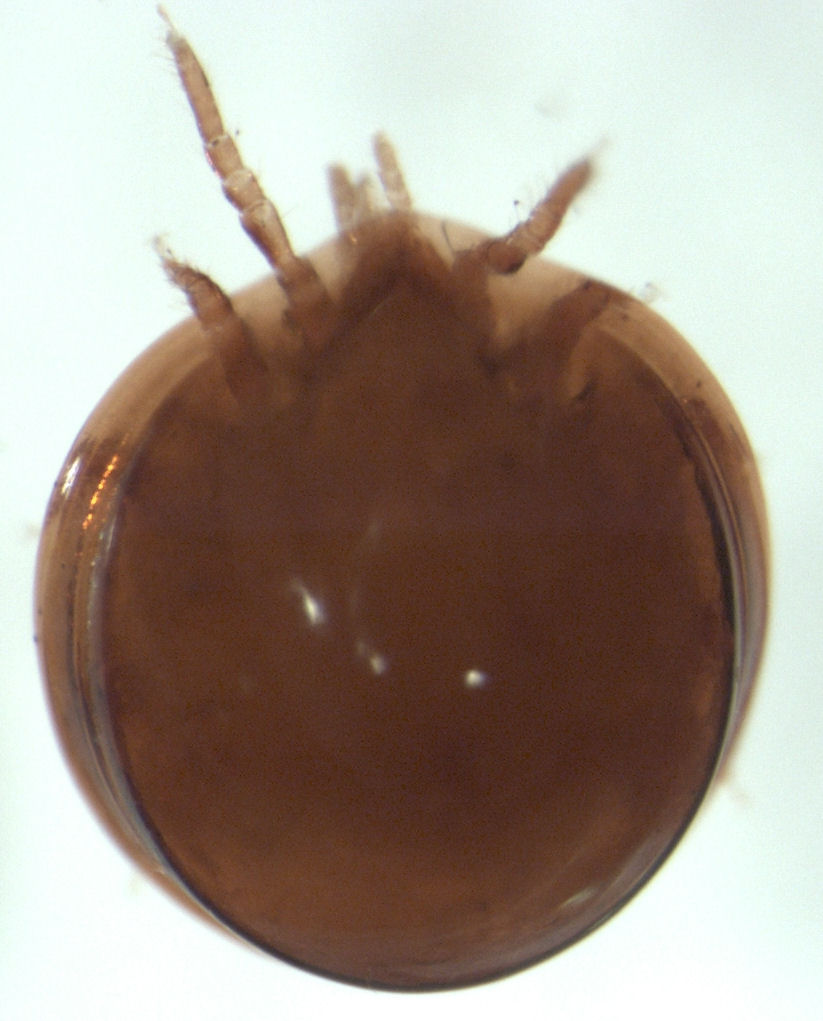
- Oplitis pusaterii (dorsal)

Scientific classification
- Kingdom: Animalia
- Phylum: Arthropoda
- Subphylum: Chelicerata
- Class: Arachnida
- Order: Mesostigmata
- Suborder: Monogynaspida
- Infraorder: Uropodina
- Superfamily: Uropodoidea
- Family: Uropodidae; Kramer, 1881

= Uropodidae =

Family of mites

Uropodidae (from Ancient Greek οὐρά (ourá), meaning "tail", and πούς (poús), meaning "foot") is a family of mites in the order Mesostigmata.

== Description ==
As part of superfamily Uropodoidea, Uropodidae are tortoise-like mites with an oval to circular outline, and with armour both dorsally and ventrally. They can be distinguished from other uropodoids by their chelicerae lacking a large, sclerotized node and their genital opening being in an intercoxal position.

== Ecology ==
Several species in the family commonly infest worm bins and consume food intended for the worms.

An undescribed species of Uropodidae sucks out the hemolymph of pupae of Pheidole megacephala ants, resulting in the death of pupae. It preferentially attacks pupae of soldier and male ants.

Uropodidae are phoretic on larger arthropods, meaning that they attach to larger arthropods to be transported to new places. This attachment is achieved using a pedicel of translucent material extruded from the mite's anus. One known host for uropodid mites is the red palm weevil (Rhynchophorus ferrugineus), though this particular relationship may actually be parasitic, as mite-infested weevils have a shorter lifespan than uninfested weevils.

== Species ==
- Afrodinychus Kontschán & Starý, 2013
  - Afrodinychus africanus Kontschán & Starý, 2013 - Tanzania
- Bloszykiella Kontschán, 2010
  - Bloszykiella africana Kontschán, 2010 - Tanzania
  - Bloszykiella grebennikovi Kontschán & Starý, 2013 - Tanzania
  - Bloszykiella tertia Kontschán & Starý, 2015 - Kenya
  - Bloszykiella ramsteini Kontschán & Ermilov, 2020 - Zimbabwe
  - Bloszykiella lindemanni Kontschán & Ermilov, 2020 - Ruanda
- Castriidinychus Hirschmann, 1973
  - Castriidinychus anguinus Hirschmann, 1973 - Chile
  - Castriidinychus baloghi Hirschmann, 1975 - Australia
  - Castriidinychus castrii (Hirschmann, 1972) - Chile
  - Castriidinychus castriisimilis Hirschmann, 1973 - Chile
  - Castriidinychus cribrarius (Berlese, 1888) - Paraguay
  - Castriidinychus dentatoides Hirschmann, 1973 - Chile
  - Castriidinychus dentatus (Hirschmann, 1972) - Chile
  - Castriidinychus dictyoeides Hirschmann, 1973 - Chile
  - Castriidinychus ditrichus (Hirschmann & Zirngiebl-Nicol, 1972) - Chile
  - Castriidinychus eupunctatosimilis Hirschmann, 1973 - Chile
  - Castriidinychus eupunctatus Hirschmann, 1973 - Chile
  - Castriidinychus flavooides Hirschmann, 1973 - Chile
  - Castriidinychus flavus Hirschmann, 1973 - Chile
  - Castriidinychus kaszabi Hirschmann, 1975 - Australia
  - Castriidinychus longisetosus Dylewska, Błoszyk & Halliday, 2010 - Tasmania
  - Castriidinychus maeandralis Hirschmann, 1973 - Chile
  - Castriidinychus mahunkai Hirschmann, 1975 - Australia
  - Castriidinychus marginalis (Hirschmann & Zirngiebl-Nicol, 1972) - Chile
  - Castriidinychus neocaledonicus Kontschán, 2013 - New Caledonia
  - Castriidinychus paucistructurus Hirschmann, 1973 - Chile
  - Castriidinychus robynae Dylewska, Błoszyk & Halliday, 2010 - Tasmania
  - Castriidinychus similidentatus Hirschmann, 1973 - Chile
  - Castriidinychus tasmanicus Dylewska, Błoszyk & Halliday, 2010 - Tasmania
  - Castriidinychus topali Hirschmann, 1973 - Argentina
- Discotrachytes Berlese, 1916
  - Discotrachytes ehimensis (Hiramatsu, 1979) - Japan
  - Discotrachytes granata (Hiramatsu & Hirschmann, 1978) - New Guinea
  - Discotrachytes grandis (Hiramatsu & Hirschmann, 1979) - Mexico
  - Discotrachytes granosa (Hiramatsu & Hirschmann, 1978) - New Guinea
  - Discotrachytes orbis (Vitzthum, 1925) - Cameroon
  - Discotrachytes ornata (Hiramatsu & Hirschmann, 1978) - New Guinea
  - Discotrachytes procera (Hiramatsu & Hirschmann, 1979) - Mexico
  - Discotrachytes procerasimilis (Hiramatsu & Hirschmann, 1979) - Mexico
  - Discotrachytes regia (Vitzthum, 1921) - Bolivia
  - Discotrachytes regiasimilis (Hirschmann, 1972) - Brazil
  - Discotrachytes splendidiformis Berlese, 1916 - East Africa
  - Discotrachytes verrucosa (Hiramatsu, 1980) - New Guinea
  - Discotrachytes vanharteni Kontschán, 2020 - Yemen
- Foveolaturopoda Hirschmann, 1979
  - Foveolaturopoda ampla (Hiramatsu & Hirschmann, 1979) - Panama
  - Foveolaturopoda boliviensis (Hiramatsu & Hirschmann, 1978) - Bolivia
  - Foveolaturopoda chernobaii (Wiśniewski & Hirschmann, 1992) - Brazil
  - Foveolaturopoda clara (Hiramatsu, 1980) - Bolivia
  - Foveolaturopoda crenulata (Marais & Theron, 1986) - South Africa
  - Foveolaturopoda cubaensis (Hiramatsu, 1980) - Cuba
  - Foveolaturopoda diffusa (Hiramatsu & Hirschmann, 1979) - Ecuador
  - Foveolaturopoda difoveolata (Hirschmann & Zirngiebl-Nicol, 1969) - Brazil
  - Foveolaturopoda difoveolatasimilis (Hirschmann, 1972) - Brazil
  - Foveolaturopoda elegans (Marais & Theron, 1986) - Angola
  - Foveolaturopoda krantzi (Hirschmann, 1975) - Republic of Congo
  - Foveolaturopoda luculenta (Hiramatsu & Hirschmann, 1978) - Peru
  - Foveolaturopoda luminosa (Hiramatsu & Hirschmann, 1983) - Ecuador
  - Foveolaturopoda nahuelhutaensis (Hirschmann, 1972) - Chile
  - Foveolaturopoda neowoelkei (Hiramatsu, 1980) - Brazil
  - Foveolaturopoda potehefstroomensis (Marais & Theron, 1986) - South Africa
  - Foveolaturopoda quadridentata (Hirschmann, 1973) - Ecuador
  - Foveolaturopoda quadridentatasimilis (Hiramatsu, 1980) - Bolivia
  - Foveolaturopoda ruehmi (Hirschmann, 1972) - Chile
  - Foveolaturopoda schusteri (Hirschmann, 1972) - Brasil
  - Foveolaturopoda tumida (Hiramatsu, 1981) - Vietnam
- Gibbauropoda Hirschmann, 1979
  - Gibbauropoda gibba (Hiramatsu, 1976) - Japan
  - Gibbauropoda hiramatsui (Hirschmann, 1976) - New Guinea
  - Gibbauropoda hiramatsuiformis (Hirschmann, 1976) - New Guinea
  - Gibbauropoda hiramatsuioides (Hirschmann, 1976) - New Guinea
  - Gibbauropoda hiramatsuisimilis (Hirschmann, 1976) - New Guinea
  - Gibbauropoda lauta (Hiramatsu & Hirschmann, 1983) - New Guinea
  - Gibbauropoda matskasii (Hirschmann, 1981) - Vietnam
  - Gibbauropoda meridiana (Hiramatsu & Hirschmann, 1978) - New Guinea
  - Gibbauropoda setata (Kontschán & Starý, 2011) - Vietnam
- Metadinychus Berlese, 1916
  - Metadinychus andrassyi Hirschmann, 1972 - Argentina, Mexico
  - Metadinychu argasiformis Berlese, 1916 - Brazil, Bolivia
  - Metadinychus daelei Hirschmann, 1981 - Zaire
  - Metadinychus exilis Hiramatsu & Hirschmann, 1979 - Mexico
  - Metadinychus kaszabi Hirschmann, 1972 - Argentina, Brazil, Paraguay
  - Metadinychus loksai Hirschmann, 1972 - Paraguay
  - Metadinychus mahunkai Hirschmann, 1972 - Brazil, Paraguay
  - Metadinychus nodosa Hirschmann, 1972 - Brazil
  - Metadinychus pura Hiramatsu & Hirschmann, 1979 - Mexico
  - Metadinychus serrata Hirschmann, 1972 - Paraguay
  - Metadinychus serratasimilis Hiramatsu & Hirschmann, 1983 - Bolivia
  - Metadinychus similiargasiformis Hirschmann, 1981 - Zaire
- Multiporuropoda Hirschmann, 1979
  - Multiporuropoda efferata (Hiramatsu, 1981) - Ecuador
  - Multiporuropoda multipora (Hirschmann & Zirngiebl-Nicol, 1969) - Panama
  - Multiporuropoda stolida (Hiramatsu & Hirschmann, 1978) - Peru
  - Multiporuropoda stolidasimilis (Hiramatsu & Hirschmann, 1979) - Peru
  - Multiporuropoda ecuadorica (Kontschán, 2012) - Ecuador
- Olodiscus Berlese, 1917
  - Olodiscus crozetensis (Richters, 1907) - Antarktica
  - Olodiscus halberti (Hirschmann, 1993) - Ireland
  - Olodiscus hispanica (Hirschmann & Zirngiebl-Nicol, 1969) - Spain
  - Olodiscus kargi (Hirschmann & Zirngiebl-Nicol, 1969) - Central Europe
  - Olodiscus minima (Kramer, 1882) - Europe and South America
  - Olodiscus minuscula (Huţu, 1983) - Romania
  - Olodiscus misella (Berlese, 1916) - Europe
  - Olodiscus neuherzi (Hirschmann & Hiramatsu, 1978) - Austria
  - Olodiscus saxonica (Willmann, 1955) - Germany
  - Olodiscus willmanni (Hirschmann & Zirngiebl-Nicol, 1969) - Germany
  - Olodiscus zicsii (Hirschmann, 1972) - Chile
- Penicillaturopoda Hirschmann, 1979
  - Penicillaturopoda complicata (Berlese, 1905) - Indonesia, Java
  - Penicillaturopoda garciai (Hirschmann & Hiramatsu, 1990) - Indonesia
  - Penicillaturopoda micherdzinskii (Hirschmann, 1972) - Vietnam
  - Penicillaturopoda penicillata (Hirschmann & Zirngiebl-Nicol, 1969) - Panama
  - Penicillaturopoda penicillatasimilis (Hirschmann, 1972) - Brazil
- Spinosissuropoda Hirschmann, 1979
  - Spinosissuropoda alata (Hirschmann, 1981) - Tanzania
  - Spinosissuropoda ancorae (Hirschmann, 1981) - Tanzania
  - Spinosissuropoda ancoraesimilis (Hirschmann, 1981) - Tanzania
  - Spinosissuropoda pocsi (Hirschmann, 1981) - Tanzania
  - Spinosissuropoda solarissima (Hirschmann, 1981) - Tanzania
  - Spinosissuropoda spinossisima (Berlese, 1916) - Tanzania
  - Spinosissuropoda tanzanica Kontschán& Starý, 2013 - Tanzania
- Trachycilliba Berlese, 1903
  - Trachycilliba abanatica (Bal & Özkan, 2007) - Turkey, Greece and Iran
  - Trachycilliba aokii (Hiramatsu, 1979) - Japan
  - Trachycilliba fabiani (Kontschán & Starý, 2013) - Ethiopia
  - Trachycilliba imadatei (Hiramatsu, 1980) - Indonesia
  - Trachycilliba insulana (Hiramatsu, 1979) - Japan
  - Trachycilliba insulanasimilis (Hiramatsu, 1981) - Japan
  - Trachycilliba iriomotensis (Hiramatsu, 1979) - Japan
  - Trachycilliba ishikawai (Hiramatsu, 1978) - Japan
  - Trachycilliba montana (Hiramatsu, 1979) - Japan
  - Trachycilliba montivaga (Hiramatsu, 1981) - Japan
  - Trachycilliba morikawai (Hiramatsu, 1978) - Japan
  - Trachycilliba novaguinensis (Hiramatsu, 1980) - New Guinea
  - Trachycilliba okumai (Hiramatsu, 1980) - Japan
  - Trachycilliba oshimaensis (Hiramatsu, 1979) - Japan
  - Trachycilliba persica (Kazemi & Kontschán, 2007) - Iran
  - Trachycilliba permagna (Hiramatsu & Hirschmann, 1979) - USA
  - Trachycilliba porticensis (Berlese, 1903) - Italy
  - Trachycilliba pulcherrima (Berlese, 1903) - Europe
  - Trachycilliba pulverea (Hiramatsu, 1976) - Japan
  - Trachycilliba quadra (Kontschán, Hwang, Jeon & Seo, 2016) - Korea
  - Trachycilliba sasayamaensis (Hiramatsu, 1979) - Japan
  - Trachycilliba shibai (Hiramatsu, 1980) - Malaysia
  - Trachycilliba shikokuensis (Hiramatsu, 1979) - Japan
  - Trachycilliba similimorikawai (Hiramatsu, 1979) - Japan
  - Trachycilliba simulans (Berlese, 1905) - Indonesia, Java
  - Trachycilliba splendida (Kramer, 1882) - Japan
  - Trachycilliba terrestrisa (Hiramatsu & Hirschmann, 1977) - Japan
  - Trachycilliba theroni (Hirschmann, 1993) - Tanzania
  - Trachycilliba tropicana (Hiramatsu, 1978) - New Guinea
  - Trachycilliba tropicanasimilis (Hiramatsu, 1981) - New Guinea
  - Trachycilliba tsushimaensis (Hiramatsu, 1980) - Japan
  - Trachycilliba uncenensis (Hiramatsu, 1977) - Japan
  - Trachycilliba vietnamensis (Hiramatsu, 1981) - Vietnam
  - Trachycilliba yakuensis (Hiramatsu, 1979) - Japan
- Uropoda Latreille, 1806
  - Centrouropoda almerodai Hiramatsu et Hirschmann, 1992 - Philippines, Europe
  - Centrouropoda rackae Hirschmann, 1975 - Trinidad
  - Centrouropoda rhombogyna (Berlese, 1910) - Indonesia, Java
  - Centrouropoda bahariyaensis Abo-Shnaf & Allam, 2019 - Egypt
- Uropolyaspis Berlese, 1904
  - Uropolyaspis hamulifera (Michael, 1894) - Europe
  - Uropolyaspis similihamulifera (Hiramatsu, 1979) - Japan
  - Uropolyaspis spinosula Kneissl, 1916 - Central Europe
