= Panteniphididae =

Scientific classification
- Kingdom: Animalia
- Phylum: Arthropoda
- Subphylum: Chelicerata
- Class: Arachnida
- Order: Mesostigmata
- Family: Panteniphididae; L. M. M. K. d'Antony, 1987

Family of mites

Panteniphididae is a small family of mites in the order Mesostigmata.

== Species ==
Panteniphididae contains two genera, with four recognized species:

- Genus Lindquistoseius Genis, Loots & Ryke, 1969
  - Lindquistoseius africanus Genis, Loots & Ryke, 1969
  - Lindquistoseius tanzaniae (Hirschmann, 1983)
- Genus Panteniphis Willmann, 1949
  - Panteniphis athiasae Hirschmann, 1983
  - Panteniphis mirandus Willmann, 1949
