= Vermiculation =

Pattern of irregular, worm-like lines

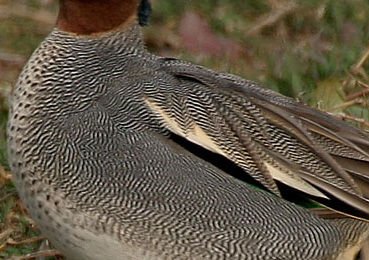
Close view of a common teal showing the vermiculation pattern in its feathers.

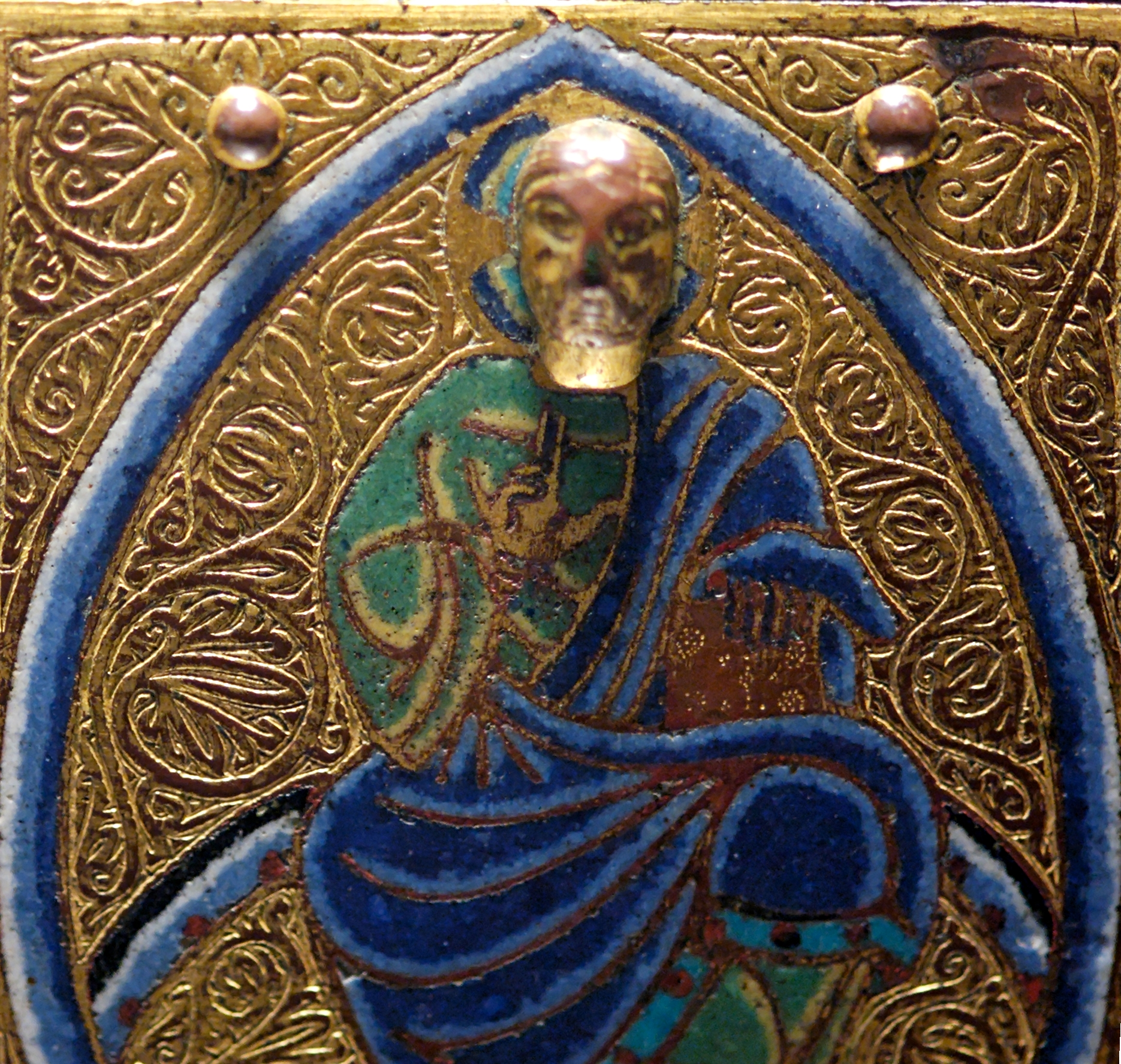
Detail showing a "vermiculated" background on a chasse reliquary casket

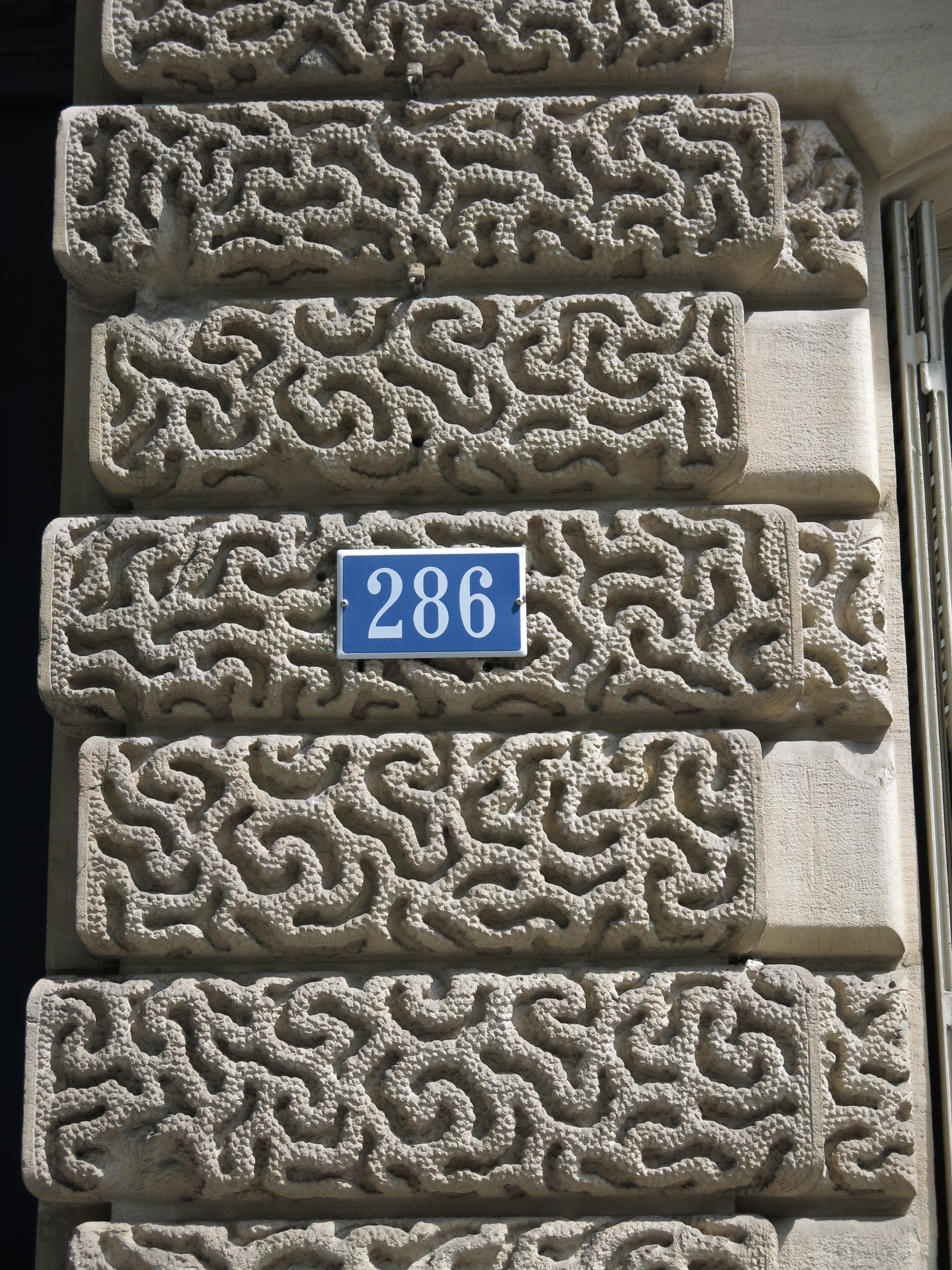
Architectural vermiculation in Paris

Vermiculation is a surface pattern of dense but irregular lines, so called from the Latin vermiculus meaning "little worm" because the shapes resemble worms, worm casts, or worm tracks in mud or wet sand. The word may be used in a number of contexts for patterns that have little in common. The adjective vermiculated is more often used than the noun.

Vermiculation naturally occurs in patterns on a wide variety of species, for example in the feathers of certain birds, for which it may provide either camouflage or decoration. Several species are named after this trait, either in English or by the Latin vermicularis.

It also appears in architecture as a form of rustication where the stone is cut with a pattern of wandering lines. In metalwork, vermiculation is used to form a type of background found in Romanesque enamels, especially on chasse reliquary caskets. In this case the term is used for what is in fact a dense pattern of regular ornament using plant forms and tendrils. In Ancient Roman mosaics, opus vermiculatum was the most detailed technique, and pieces are often described as "vermiculated" in English.

== Species named "vermiculated" ==
Several species of owls are named for their vermiculated patterns

- Vermiculated fishing-owl (Scotopelia bouvieri), an owl species found in Africa
- Vermiculated eagle-owl or greyish eagle-owl (Bubo cinerascens), an owl species
- Vermiculated screech-owl (Megascops guatemalae), an owl species

Other

- Vermiculated angelfish, a Chaetodontoplus marine angelfish
- Vermiculate parrotfish
- Vermiculate shrew or Xanthippe's shrew (Crocidura xantippe), Africa
- Vermiculated tree frog (Leptopelis vermiculatus), Africa
- Vermiculated spinefoot (Siganus vermiculatus), also known as Maze Rabbitfish, is a species of rabbitfish

== Species named vermicularis ==
Some species have patterns that look like little worms, others actually are little worms. Some of these names have now been superseded.

- Alcinoe vermicularis, in the Ocyropsidae family of ctenophores
- Alnus vermicularis, an alder tree
- Blutaparon vermiculare (or Gomphrena vermicularis, Philoxerus vermicularis), plant in the Americas
- Burmagomphus vermicularis, a dragonfly
- Chelonistele vermicularis, a species of orchid
- Clavaria vermicularis a fungus
- Cobelura vermicularis, a species of longhorn beetles
- Dendrolaelaps vermicularis, a mite species
- Encheliophis vermicularis, a worm pearlfish species
- Enterobius vermicularis, a parasitic nematode, the human threadworm or pinworm
- Entomacrodus vermiculatus, a species of combtooth blenny native to the Indian Ocean
- Lacrymaria vermicularis, a ciliate protist species
- Medicago vermicularis, a plant now usually called Medicago coronata
- Ophiobatrachus vermicularis, a salamander
- Philedone vermicularis, a moth
- Pseudanthus vermicularis, Australian plant
- Sepia vermicularis, known as the common cuttlefish or ink-fish, endemic to South Africa
- Serpula vermicularis, a segmented marine worm
- Takifugu vermicularis, the Purple puffer, a species of Asian pufferfish
- Thamnolia vermicularis, a fungus species in Australia
- Turritella vermicularis, an extinct species of sea snail
- Typhlops vermicularis, the European blind snake or European worm snake, no larger than a worm

== Other uses ==
- Vermiculate atrophoderma (Atrophodermia vermiculata) a genetic skin disease
- A variant form of rustication (architecture)

The rock texture myrmekite is composed of vermicular worm-like intergrowths of quartz and feldspar.
