= E. vermicularis =

E. vermicularis may refer to:

- Encheliophis vermicularis, a pearlfish species
- Enterobius vermicularis, the human pinworm, a parasitic nematode worm species solely affecting humans

== See also ==
- Vermicularis (disambiguation)
