= C. vermicularis =

C. vermicularis may refer to:

- Chelonistele vermicularis, an orchid species
- Clavaria vermicularis, the white coral worm, fairy finger, a fungus species
- Coelogyne vermicularis, J.J.Sm., an orchid species in the genus Coelogyne

== See also ==
- Vermicularis (disambiguation)
