= Dendrolaelaps disetus =

Scientific classification
- Domain: Eukaryota
- Kingdom: Animalia
- Phylum: Arthropoda
- Subphylum: Chelicerata
- Class: Arachnida
- Order: Mesostigmata
- Family: Digamasellidae
- Genus: Dendrolaelaps
- Species: D. disetus

Binomial name
- Dendrolaelaps disetus Hirschmann, 1960

Species of mite

Dendrolaelaps disetus is a species of mite in the family Digamasellidae.
