= Dendrolaelaps punctatus =

Scientific classification
- Kingdom: Animalia
- Phylum: Arthropoda
- Subphylum: Chelicerata
- Class: Arachnida
- Order: Mesostigmata
- Family: Digamasellidae
- Genus: Dendrolaelaps
- Species: D. punctatus

Binomial name
- Dendrolaelaps punctatus Hirschmann, 1960

Species of mite

Dendrolaelaps punctatus is a species of mite in the family Digamasellidae. It is found in Europe.
