= Dendrolaelaps casualis =

Scientific classification
- Domain: Eukaryota
- Kingdom: Animalia
- Phylum: Arthropoda
- Subphylum: Chelicerata
- Class: Arachnida
- Order: Mesostigmata
- Family: Digamasellidae
- Genus: Dendrolaelaps
- Species: D. casualis

Binomial name
- Dendrolaelaps casualis Huhta & Karg, 2010

Species of mite

Dendrolaelaps casualis is a species of mite first found in Finland.
