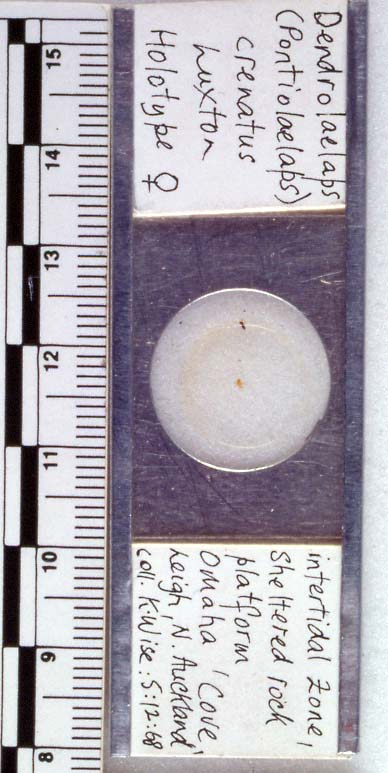
- Holotype of Pontiolaelaps crenatus from Auckland War Memorial Museum

Scientific classification
- Kingdom: Animalia
- Phylum: Arthropoda
- Subphylum: Chelicerata
- Class: Arachnida
- Order: Mesostigmata
- Family: Digamasellidae
- Genus: Pontiolaelaps
- Species: P. crenatus

Binomial name
- Pontiolaelaps crenatus Luxton, 1984

Synonyms
- Dendrolaelaps crenatus

= Pontiolaelaps crenatus =

Species of mite

Pontiolaelaps crenatus is a species of mite in the family Digamasellidae. It was first described by Malcolm Luxton in 1984, who used the name Dendrolaelaps crenatus.
