= Dendrolaelaps nostricornutus =

Scientific classification
- Domain: Eukaryota
- Kingdom: Animalia
- Phylum: Arthropoda
- Subphylum: Chelicerata
- Class: Arachnida
- Order: Mesostigmata
- Family: Digamasellidae
- Genus: Dendrolaelaps
- Species: D. nostricornutus

Binomial name
- Dendrolaelaps nostricornutus Hirschmann & Wisniewski, 1982

Species of mite

Dendrolaelaps nostricornutus is a species of mite in the family Digamasellidae. It is found in Europe.
