= Dendrolaelaps reticulatus =

Scientific classification
- Domain: Eukaryota
- Kingdom: Animalia
- Phylum: Arthropoda
- Subphylum: Chelicerata
- Class: Arachnida
- Order: Mesostigmata
- Family: Digamasellidae
- Genus: Dendrolaelaps
- Species: D. reticulatus

Binomial name
- Dendrolaelaps reticulatus (Berlese, 1920)

Species of mite

Dendrolaelaps reticulatus is a species of mite in the family Digamasellidae.
