= Dendrolaelaps angulosus =

Scientific classification
- Domain: Eukaryota
- Kingdom: Animalia
- Phylum: Arthropoda
- Subphylum: Chelicerata
- Class: Arachnida
- Order: Mesostigmata
- Family: Digamasellidae
- Genus: Dendrolaelaps
- Species: D. angulosus

Binomial name
- Dendrolaelaps angulosus (Willmann, 1936)

Species of mite

Dendrolaelaps angulosus is a species of mite in the family Digamasellidae. It is found in Europe.
