= Multidendrolaelaps subcorticalis =

Scientific classification
- Domain: Eukaryota
- Kingdom: Animalia
- Phylum: Arthropoda
- Subphylum: Chelicerata
- Class: Arachnida
- Order: Mesostigmata
- Family: Digamasellidae
- Genus: Multidendrolaelaps
- Species: M. subcorticalis

Binomial name
- Multidendrolaelaps subcorticalis Huhta & Karg, 2010

Species of mite

Multidendrolaelaps subcorticalis is a species of mite first found in Finland.
