= Digamasellus australis =

Scientific classification
- Kingdom: Animalia
- Phylum: Arthropoda
- Subphylum: Chelicerata
- Class: Arachnida
- Order: Mesostigmata
- Family: Digamasellidae
- Genus: Digamasellus
- Species: D. australis

Binomial name
- Digamasellus australis Lindquist, 1975

Species of mite

Digamasellus australis is a species of mite in the family Digamasellidae, first described by Evert E. Lindquist in 1975.
