= Multidendrolaelaps putte =

Scientific classification
- Domain: Eukaryota
- Kingdom: Animalia
- Phylum: Arthropoda
- Subphylum: Chelicerata
- Class: Arachnida
- Order: Mesostigmata
- Family: Digamasellidae
- Genus: Multidendrolaelaps
- Species: M. putte

Binomial name
- Multidendrolaelaps putte Huhta & Karg, 2010

Species of mite

Multidendrolaelaps putte is a species of mite first found in Finland.

The used sample was taken from a decaying trunk of aspen in 2007-09-07. According to the discoverers, the name M. putte is a reference to the Finnish abbreviation of the title of the project which made the study possible.
