= Digamasellus punctum =

Scientific classification
- Kingdom: Animalia
- Phylum: Arthropoda
- Subphylum: Chelicerata
- Class: Arachnida
- Order: Mesostigmata
- Family: Digamasellidae
- Genus: Digamasellus
- Species: D. punctum

Binomial name
- Digamasellus punctum (Berlese, 1904)

Species of mite

Digamasellus punctum is a species of mite in the family Digamasellidae.
