= Dendrolaelaspis longisetosus =

Scientific classification
- Domain: Eukaryota
- Kingdom: Animalia
- Phylum: Arthropoda
- Subphylum: Chelicerata
- Class: Arachnida
- Order: Mesostigmata
- Family: Digamasellidae
- Genus: Dendrolaelaspis
- Species: D. longisetosus

Binomial name
- Dendrolaelaspis longisetosus (Shcherbak, 1977)

Species of mite

Dendrolaelaspis longisetosus is a species of mite in the family Digamasellidae.
