= Dendrolaelaps quadripilus =

Scientific classification
- Domain: Eukaryota
- Kingdom: Animalia
- Phylum: Arthropoda
- Subphylum: Chelicerata
- Class: Arachnida
- Order: Mesostigmata
- Family: Digamasellidae
- Genus: Dendrolaelaps
- Species: D. quadripilus

Binomial name
- Dendrolaelaps quadripilus (Berlese, 1920)

Synonyms
- Gamasellus quadripilus Berlese, 1920

Species of mite

Dendrolaelaps quadripilus is a species of mite in the family Ologamasidae.

This species was formerly a member of the genus Gamasellus.
