= Dendrolaelaps formicarius =

Scientific classification
- Kingdom: Animalia
- Phylum: Arthropoda
- Subphylum: Chelicerata
- Class: Arachnida
- Order: Mesostigmata
- Family: Digamasellidae
- Genus: Dendrolaelaps
- Species: D. formicarius

Binomial name
- Dendrolaelaps formicarius (Huhta & Karg, 2010)

Synonyms
- Punctodendrolaelaps formicarius Huhta & Karg, 2010

Species of mite

Dendrolaelaps formicarius is a species of mite first found in Finland.
