= Dendrolaelaps samsinaki =

Scientific classification
- Domain: Eukaryota
- Kingdom: Animalia
- Phylum: Arthropoda
- Subphylum: Chelicerata
- Class: Arachnida
- Order: Mesostigmata
- Family: Digamasellidae
- Genus: Dendrolaelaps
- Species: D. samsinaki

Binomial name
- Dendrolaelaps samsinaki Hirschmann & Wisniewski, 1982

Species of mite

Dendrolaelaps samsinaki is a species of mite in the family Digamasellidae.
