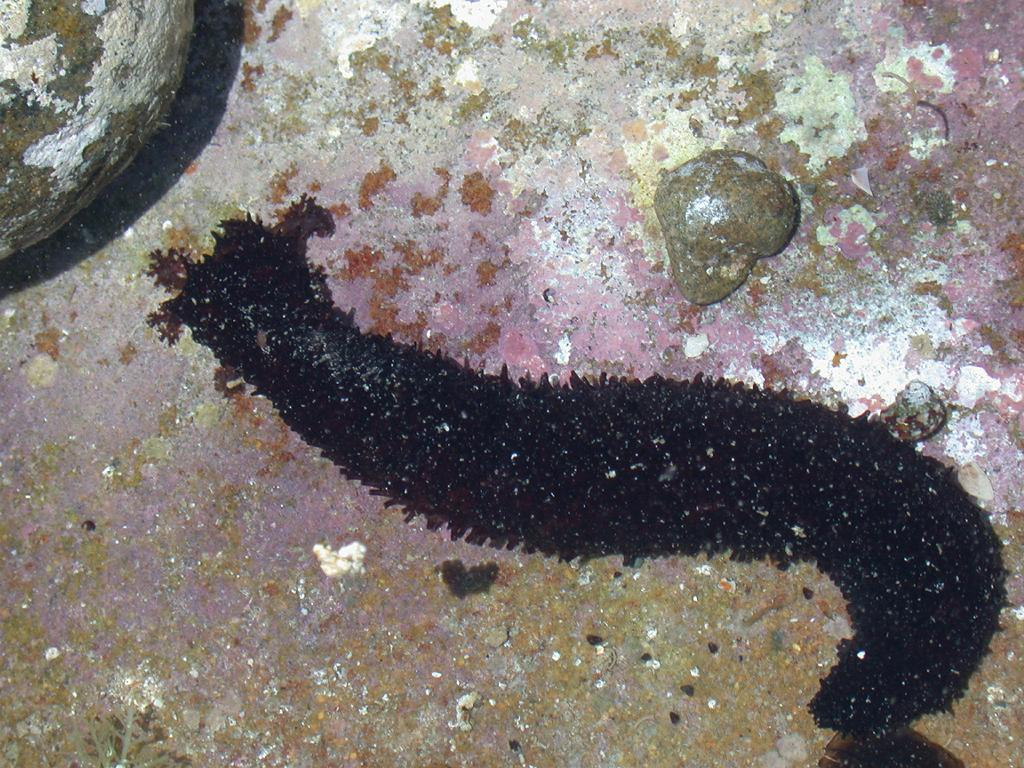

Conservation status
- Least Concern (IUCN 3.1)

Scientific classification
- Kingdom: Animalia
- Phylum: Echinodermata
- Class: Holothuroidea
- Order: Holothuriida
- Family: Holothuriidae
- Genus: Holothuria
- Species: H. leucospilota

Binomial name
- Holothuria leucospilota Brandt, 1835

Synonyms
- Halodeima dicorona Heding, 1934; Holothuria (Halodeima) dicorona (Heding, 1934); Holothuria gelatinosa Heding, 1939; Holothuria homoea Clark, 1938; Holothuria infesta Sluiter, 1901; Holothuria lagoena Haacke, 1880; Holothuria lamperti Ludwig, 1887; Holothuria oxurropa Sluiter, 1887; Holothuria vagabunda Selenka, 1867; Stichopus (Gymnochirota) leucospilota Brandt, 1835

= Holothuria leucospilota =

Species of sea cucumber

Holothuria leucospilota, commonly known as the black sea cucumber or black tarzan, is a species of marine invertebrate in the family Holothuriidae. It is placed in the subgenus Mertensiothuria making its full scientific name Holothuria (Mertensiothuria) leucospilota. It is the type species of the subgenus and is found on the seabed in shallow water in the Indo-Pacific.

== Description ==
Holothuria leucospilota is a medium-sized sea cucumber reaching a length of up to 40 centimetres (16 in) when relaxed but it can stretch to about a metre (yard) when extended. It is roughly cylindrical, tapering towards the posterior end. At the anterior end, there are twenty oral tentacles with branched tips. These surround the mouth which is on the under side of the body. The animal is soft and pliable and is covered with fleshy papillae. The usual colour is charcoal grey or reddish-black with pale grey tube feet on the underside but off the African coast it is described as being bright or dark brown with white patches which are larger towards the posterior end.

== Distribution ==
Holothuria leucospilota is found in shallow water along the east coast of Africa and in much of the Indo-Pacific region. It is a common species on the north east coast of Australia where it is found on reefs and rocky coasts, often partly concealed under a boulder.

A study done near Singapore found that Holothuria leucospilota was more common near boulders, corals and seaweed clumps than it was on the open seabed. It found that this species is relatively tolerant of changes in salinity and temperature and continued to thrive in the laboratory when these parameters were changed. Under the same conditions, the Japanese sea cucumber (Apostichopus japonicus) shrank in size, eviscerated, and died within three days. In Singapore, Apostichopus japonicus is consumed as food and is becoming increasingly rare as a result of overexploitation.

== Biology ==
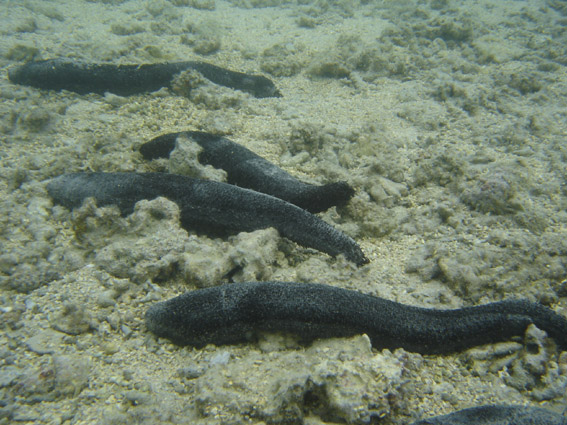
Several Holothuria leucospilota on a sandy seabed

Holothuria leucospilota is a scavenger and when feeding it usually has its posterior end anchored underneath a rock or in a crevice so that it can contract back out of sight if disturbed. It feeds by using its tentacles to shovel organic debris lying on the seabed into its mouth. In the process it swallows a significant quantity of sand, which passes through the gut.

If threatened, Holothuria leucospilota can emit a mass of fine sticky Cuvierian tubules from its anus which ensnare the potential predator allowing the sea cucumber to escape. It can regenerate these tubules in fifteen to eighteen days.

The worm pearlfish (Encheliophis vermicularis) is a parasite of this species and each parasitised H. leucospilota will host a male and female pair of the fish which live inside its body.
