= Digamasellus =

Scientific classification
- Kingdom: Animalia
- Phylum: Arthropoda
- Subphylum: Chelicerata
- Class: Arachnida
- Order: Mesostigmata
- Family: Digamasellidae
- Genus: Digamasellus; Berlese, 1905

Genus of mites

Digamasellus is a genus of mites in the family Digamasellidae. There are at least three described species in Digamasellus.

== Species ==
These three species belong to the genus Digamasellus:

- Digamasellus australis Lindquist, 1975
- Digamasellus punctum (Berlese, 1904)
- Digamasellus variabilis Wisniewski & Hirschmann, 1989
