= Multidendrolaelaps =

Scientific classification
- Kingdom: Animalia
- Phylum: Arthropoda
- Subphylum: Chelicerata
- Class: Arachnida
- Order: Mesostigmata
- Family: Digamasellidae
- Genus: Multidendrolaelaps; Hirschmann, 1974

Genus of mites

Multidendrolaelaps is a genus of mites in the family Digamasellidae. There are at least 30 described species in Multidendrolaelaps.

== Species ==
These 30 species belong to the genus Multidendrolaelaps:

- Multidendrolaelaps acriluteus (Athias-Henriot, 1961)
- Multidendrolaelaps baddeley (Hirschmann & Wisniewski, 1984)
- Multidendrolaelaps bakeri (Hirschmann & Wisniewski, 1982)
- Multidendrolaelaps bispinosus (Karg, 1971)
- Multidendrolaelaps camerunis (Wisniewski & Hirschmann, 1984)
- Multidendrolaelaps carinthiacus Schmölzer, 1995
- Multidendrolaelaps daelei (Hirschmann & Wisniewski, 1982)
- Multidendrolaelaps epistospinosus Shcherbak, 1985
- Multidendrolaelaps euepistomoides (Hirschmann & Wisniewski, 1982)
- Multidendrolaelaps euepistomosimilis (Hirschmann & Wisniewski, 1982)
- Multidendrolaelaps euepistomus (Hirschmann, 1960)
- Multidendrolaelaps hexaspinosus (Hirschmann, 1954)
- Multidendrolaelaps hurlbutti Shcherbak, 1985
- Multidendrolaelaps inconstans Shcherbak, 1985
- Multidendrolaelaps isodentatus (Hurlbutt, 1967)
- Multidendrolaelaps kargi (Hirschmann, 1966)
- Multidendrolaelaps kribii (Wisniewski & Hirschmann, 1984)
- Multidendrolaelaps manualkrantzi (Hirschmann & Wisniewski, 1982)
- Multidendrolaelaps multidentatus (Leitner, 1949)
- Multidendrolaelaps putte Huhta & Karg, 2010
- Multidendrolaelaps querci (Hirschmann, 1960)
- Multidendrolaelaps schusteri (Hirschmann, 1966)
- Multidendrolaelaps spinosus (Hirschmann, 1960)
- Multidendrolaelaps subcorticalis Huhta & Karg, 2010
- Multidendrolaelaps templei (Hunter, 1970)
- Multidendrolaelaps tetraspinosus (Hirschmann, 1954)
- Multidendrolaelaps trispinosus Shcherbak, 1985
- Multidendrolaelaps ulmi (Hirschmann, 1960)
- Multidendrolaelaps unispinatus (Ishikawa, 1977)
- Multidendrolaelaps watsoni (Hirschmann, 1966)
