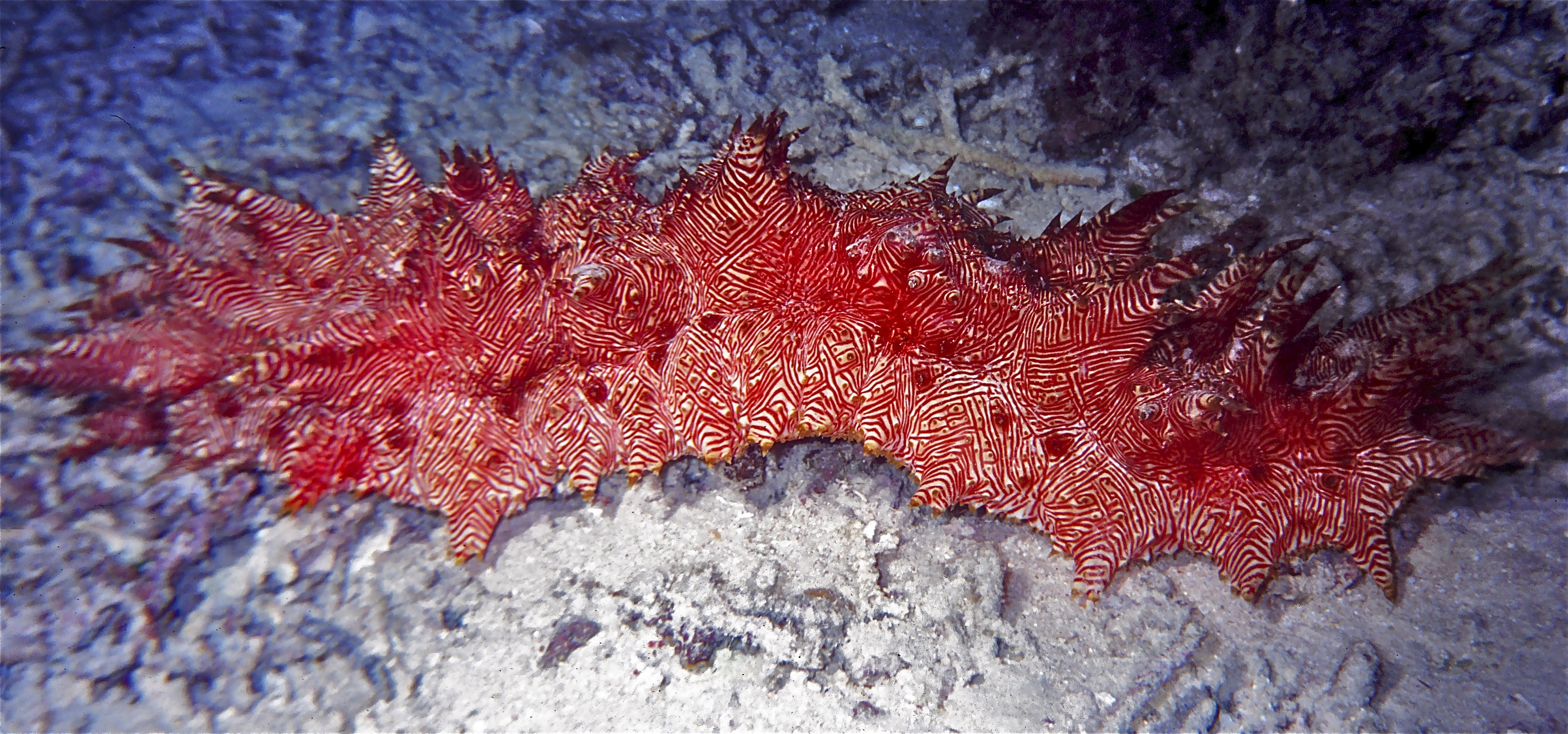
- Thelenota rubralineata

Conservation status
- Endangered (IUCN 3.1)

Scientific classification
- Kingdom: Animalia
- Phylum: Echinodermata
- Class: Holothuroidea
- Order: Synallactida
- Family: Stichopodidae
- Genus: Thelenota
- Species: T. rubralineata

Binomial name
- Thelenota rubralineata Massin & Lane, 1991

= Thelenota rubralineata =

Species of sea cucumber

Thelenota rubralineata is a species of sea cucumber in the family Stichopodidae, in the phylum Echinodermata, mainly located in the central Indo-Pacific region. It has a distinctive coloring pattern, and can be found on the seabed near coral. T. rubralineata is a member of the Thelenota genus, characterized by their large size and the presence of a calcareous ring.

== Description ==
Thelenota rubralineata has an elongated, roughly trapezoidal body 30 to 39 cm long and 8 cm wide in its uncontracted state. Like other Thelenota, it has well marked differences between its ventral and dorsal surface, with papillae and pedicels covering its dorsal surface, and numerous podia scattered randomly on its ventral surface. The dorsal protrusions are arranged in two rows of 13 to 15 large, conical arms, many of which ending in spiked papillae. The sides of the body are also covered in a continuous row of multipapillate protrusions, with smaller outgrowths distributed randomly over the body.

The body of T. rubralineata is covered in a complex pattern of red lines on top of a white base. Towards the middle of the body, these lines run parallel and intersect, forming maze-like patterns. The conical protrusions are also covered in this pattern, with papillae ending in white peaks. The podia are pale greenish-yellow, while the tentacles, twenty in number, are red.

== Distribution and habitat ==
Thelenota rubralineata is found on outer coral reef slopes with large rubble and coarse sand patches near islands 20 meters and deeper. This species is widespread throughout the Indo-Pacific region.

== Biology ==
Like other Thelenota, T. rubralineata contains calcareous spicules in the form of granules and branched rods. Located throughout the body wall, these structures serve as both structural support and defense from predators. Two polian vesicles provide the basis for locomotion. Five longitudinal muscles are broad, V-shaped, and attached to the body wall. A short digestive tract, two narrow respiratory trees, and a small circulatory system running parallel to the intestines is also present.

When in motion, the lateral protuberances play a role in walking. When disturbed, T. rubralineata bends its body in a helical fashion, arranging its mouth close to the anus, and assumes this position for up to 10 minutes or longer, then moves again.

Lifespan for this species is currently unknown. However, like other echinoderms, T. rubralineata is suspected to regenerate. As a result, lifespan cannot be estimated, but is assumed to be greater than multiple decades in their natural environment.

== Commercial uses ==
Thelenota rubralineata and other species of echinoderms are commonly harvested in the Western Central Pacific region. Thelenota is often harvested in many regions of Micronesia, Polynesia, Melanesia, Australia, and New Zealand. When observed by divers, T. rubralineata was widespread but rarely found in large densities. Although T. rubralineata is not one of the most economically profitable species for fisheries, this species may become more prone to over-fishing due to a reduction in more commonly used species of echinoderms.
