= Cobelura =

Scientific classification
- Kingdom: Animalia
- Phylum: Arthropoda
- Class: Insecta
- Order: Coleoptera
- Suborder: Polyphaga
- Infraorder: Cucujiformia
- Family: Cerambycidae
- Subfamily: Lamiinae
- Tribe: Acanthocinini
- Genus: Cobelura; Erichson, 1847

Genus of beetles

Cobelura is a genus of beetles in the family Cerambycidae, containing the following species:

- Cobelura claviger (Bates, 1885)
- Cobelura howdenorum Corbett, 2004
- Cobelura lorigera Erichson, 1847
- Cobelura peruviana (Aurivillius, 1920)
- Cobelura sergioi Monné, 1984
- Cobelura stockwelli Corbett, 2004
- Cobelura vermicularis Kirsch, 1889
- Cobelura wappesi Corbett, 2004
