= Cobelura claviger =

Scientific classification
- Kingdom: Animalia
- Phylum: Arthropoda
- Class: Insecta
- Order: Coleoptera
- Suborder: Polyphaga
- Infraorder: Cucujiformia
- Family: Cerambycidae
- Genus: Cobelura
- Species: C. claviger

Binomial name
- Cobelura claviger (Bates, 1885)

Species of beetle

Cobelura claviger is a species of longhorn beetle of the subfamily Lamiinae. It was described by Henry Walter Bates in 1885, and is known from Costa Rica and Panama.
