= Cobelura lorigera =

Scientific classification
- Kingdom: Animalia
- Phylum: Arthropoda
- Class: Insecta
- Order: Coleoptera
- Suborder: Polyphaga
- Infraorder: Cucujiformia
- Family: Cerambycidae
- Genus: Cobelura
- Species: C. lorigera

Binomial name
- Cobelura lorigera Erichson, 1847

Species of beetle

Cobelura lorigera is a species of longhorn beetle of the subfamily Lamiinae. It was described by Wilhelm Ferdinand Erichson in 1847, and is known from Peru.
