= Cobelura peruviana =

Scientific classification
- Kingdom: Animalia
- Phylum: Arthropoda
- Class: Insecta
- Order: Coleoptera
- Suborder: Polyphaga
- Infraorder: Cucujiformia
- Family: Cerambycidae
- Genus: Cobelura
- Species: C. peruviana

Binomial name
- Cobelura peruviana (Aurivillius, 1920)

Species of beetle

Cobelura peruviana is a species of longhorn beetle of the subfamily Lamiinae. It was described by Per Olof Christopher Aurivillius in 1920 and is known from Peru (from which its species epithet is derived) and Bolivia.
