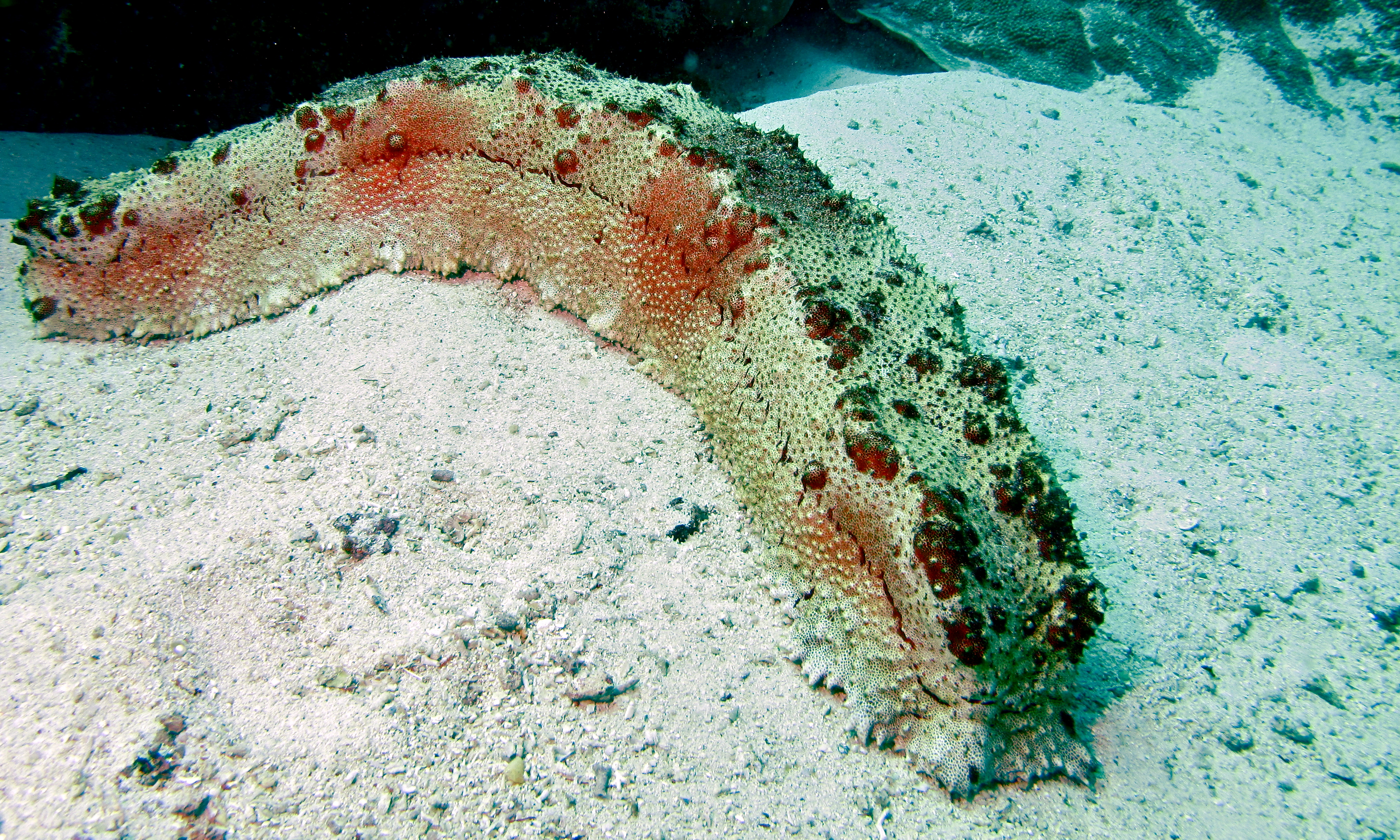

Conservation status
- Data Deficient (IUCN 3.1)

Scientific classification
- Kingdom: Animalia
- Phylum: Echinodermata
- Class: Holothuroidea
- Order: Synallactida
- Family: Stichopodidae
- Genus: Thelenota
- Species: T. anax

Binomial name
- Thelenota anax Clark, 1921

= Thelenota anax =

Species of sea cucumber

Thelenota anax is a species of sea cucumber mostly found in the tropical, South Pacific Ocean. It is also commonly known as the amber fish. Some other names for T. anax are black teatfish, blackfish, brownfish, chief sea cucumber, curryfish, elephant trunk cucumber, lollyfish, tripang, and white-teat sea cucumber. T. anax is found on sandy ocean bottoms and often have ectocommensal relationships. They are commonly fished commercially and exported because of their medicinal properties and large size.

== Description ==
The body of T. anax can be a creamy beige or light brown with dark brown or red spots. It usually has light colored bumps on the top of its body. T. anax also has large with papillae located laterally on its body. On its ventral surface there is long white podia. Its mouth is also located ventrally with 18–20 peltate tentacles. The anus is located on the dorsal side of the animal towards the terminal end. Their average length is about 69 cm long, but the longest recorded sea cucumber was 89 cm long. Some of the biggest sea cucumber can weigh up to 5 kg. It also has two gonads that are approximately 70–500mm long.

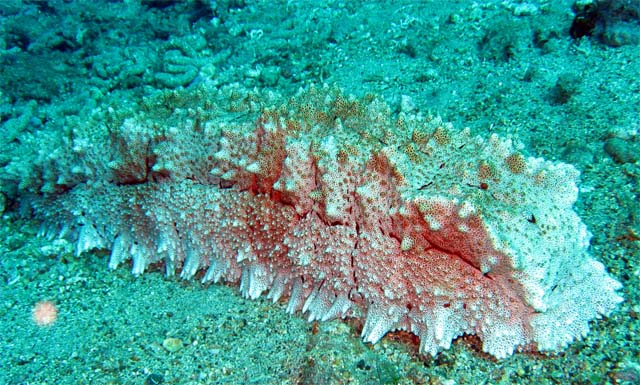
Theleonota anax

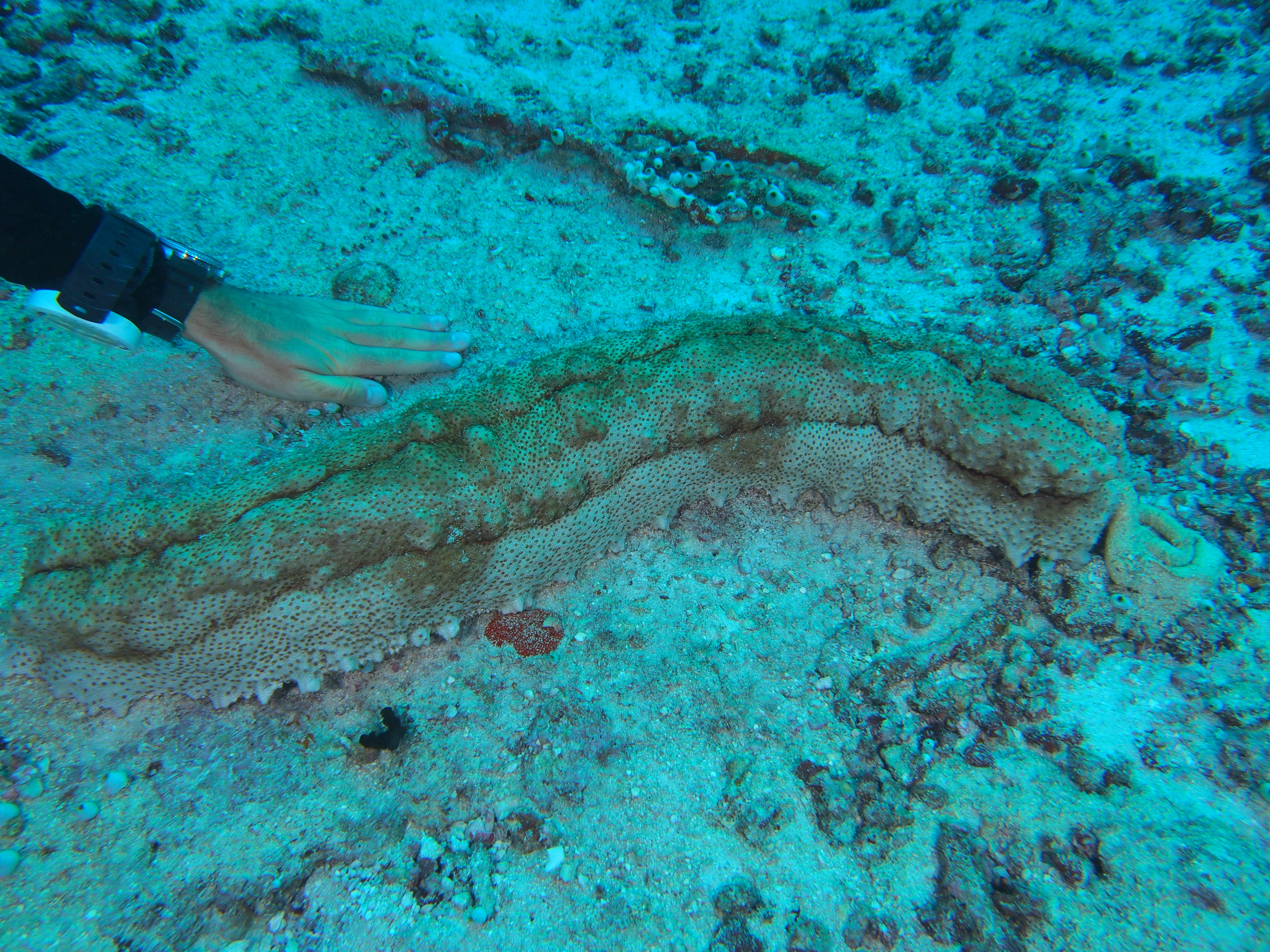
Thelenota anax in Maldives

== Habitat ==
Thelenota anax prefers to live on soft, sandy portions of the ocean floor at depths greater than 25 m. Some can be found on the sides of reef slopes.

== Ectocommensals ==
Some organism can often be found living on the outside of Thelenota anax. A few common species found on T.anax are scaleworms and gastropods. The sea cucumber does not appear to be negatively affected by these ectocommensal species.

== Commercial value ==
Many species of sea cucumbers are sold for human consumption as "beche-de-mer". In the Solomon Islands, where Thelenota anax is commonly harvested, it has a commercial value of around $6.66 per kg . It is one of the less expensive species of sea cucumbers, but is one of the more commonly exported species because of its high body mass.

== Medicinal properties ==
T. anax is commonly consumed in Asian and Middle Eastern countries for its purported medicinal benefits, although research into its effects are ongoing. T. anax produces many different bioactive compounds such as arachidonic acid, eicosapentaenoic acid, and docosahexaenoic acid. These compounds are known to reduce the risk of coronary disease, some cancers, and have anti-inflammatory properties Specifically arachidonic acid promotes blood clotting and wound healing. This is why many Asian countries use T.anax to treat burns and cuts.

Studies have also shown that T. anax produces glycosides Stichopside C (STC) and Stichoposide D (STD). STC makes Ceramide, which is a tumor suppressor lipid. It also causes the apoptosis of colorectal cancer cells and leukemia cells. STD causes the apoptosis of only leukemia cells and inhibits its growth.
