= Insectolaelaps =

Scientific classification
- Kingdom: Animalia
- Phylum: Arthropoda
- Subphylum: Chelicerata
- Class: Arachnida
- Order: Mesostigmata
- Family: Digamasellidae
- Genus: Insectolaelaps; Shcherbak, 1980

Genus of mites

Insectolaelaps is a genus of mites in the family Digamasellidae. There are at least 20 described species in Insectolaelaps.

== Species ==
These 20 species belong to the genus Insectolaelaps:

- Insectolaelaps armatus (Hirschmann, 1954)
- Insectolaelaps bialowiezae (Hirschmann & Wisniewski, 1982)
- Insectolaelaps euarmatus (Hirschmann, 1960)
- Insectolaelaps eustructurus (Hirschmann, 1960)
- Insectolaelaps hirsutus (Hirschmann, 1960)
- Insectolaelaps ipidoquadrisetus (Wisniewski & Hirschmann, 1983)
- Insectolaelaps japanoarmatus (Hirschmann & Wisniewski, 1982)
- Insectolaelaps javae (Wisniewski & Hirschmann, 1989)
- Insectolaelaps kielczewskii (Skorupski & Gwiazdowicz, 1992)
- Insectolaelaps latoarmatus (Hirschmann & Wisniewski, 1982)
- Insectolaelaps latopini (Hirschmann & Wisniewski, 1982)
- Insectolaelaps neoarmatus (Hirschmann & Wisniewski, 1982)
- Insectolaelaps nidiphilus (Wisniewski & Hirschmann, 1983)
- Insectolaelaps pini (Hirschmann, 1954)
- Insectolaelaps pinisimilis (Hirschmann, 1960)
- Insectolaelaps quadrisetoides (Hirschmann & Wisniewski, 1982)
- Insectolaelaps quadrisetosimilis (Hirschmann & Rühm, 1955)
- Insectolaelaps quadrisetus (Berlese, 1920)
- Insectolaelaps volnyi (Wisniewski & Hirschmann, 1991)
- Insectolaelaps zvoleniensis (Wisniewski & Hirschmann, 1984)
