= Dendrolaelaspis =

Scientific classification
- Kingdom: Animalia
- Phylum: Arthropoda
- Subphylum: Chelicerata
- Class: Arachnida
- Order: Mesostigmata
- Family: Digamasellidae
- Genus: Dendrolaelaspis; Lindquist, 1975

Genus of insects

Dendrolaelaspis is a genus of mites in the family Digamasellidae. There are about 19 described species in Dendrolaelaspis.

== Species ==
These 19 species belong to the genus Dendrolaelaspis:

- Dendrolaelaspis angulosus (Willmann, 1936)
- Dendrolaelaspis baculus Karg, 2003
- Dendrolaelaspis baloghi (Hirschmann, 1974)
- Dendrolaelaspis bistilus (Karg, 1979)
- Dendrolaelaspis bregetovae (Shcherbak, 1978)
- Dendrolaelaspis brevisetosus (Shcherbak, 1978)
- Dendrolaelaspis cienfuegi (Wisniewski & Hirschmann, 1989)
- Dendrolaelaspis crassilaciniae (Wisniewski & Hirschmann, 1983)
- Dendrolaelaspis eucrinis (Karg, 1979)
- Dendrolaelaspis geminus Karg, 1998
- Dendrolaelaspis hungaricus (Hirschmann & Wisniewski, 1982)
- Dendrolaelaspis lindquisti (Shcherbak, 1978)
- Dendrolaelaspis lobatus (Shcherbak & Chelebiev, 1977)
- Dendrolaelaspis longisetosus (Shcherbak, 1977)
- Dendrolaelaspis miniangulosus (Shcherbak, 1978)
- Dendrolaelaspis orientalis (Bhattacharyya, 1969)
- Dendrolaelaspis piscis (Karg, 1979)
- Dendrolaelaspis poltavae Shcherbak & Sklar, 1983
- Dendrolaelaspis sexsetosus Karg & Schorlemmer, 2009
