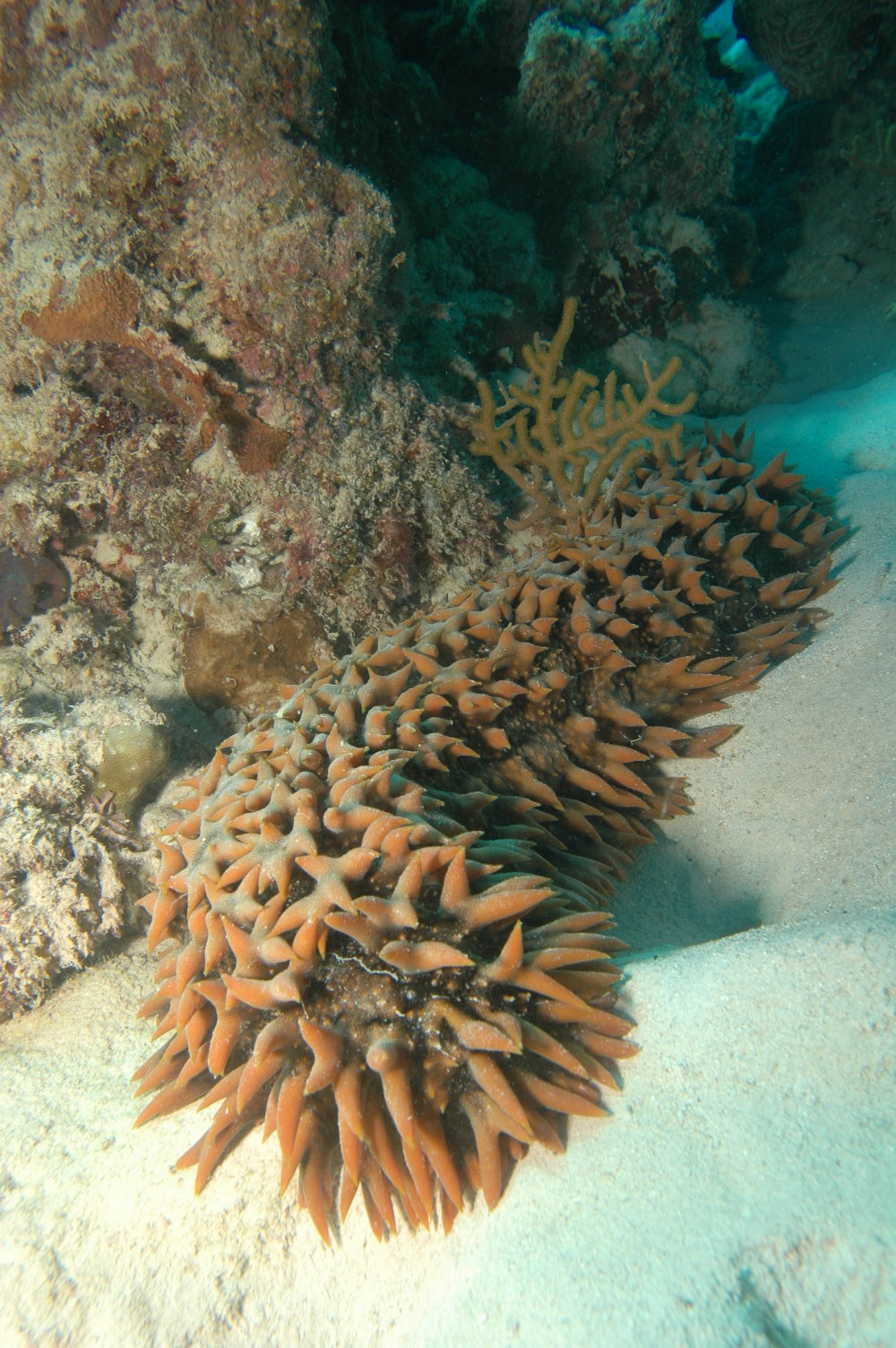
- Thelenota ananas

Scientific classification
- Kingdom: Animalia
- Phylum: Echinodermata
- Class: Holothuroidea
- Order: Synallactida
- Family: Stichopodidae
- Genus: Thelenota; Brandt, 1835

= Thelenota =

Genus of sea cucumbers

Thelenota is a genus of sea cucumber in the family Stichopodidae.

== Description and characteristics ==
They are massive sea cucumbers, more or less rectangular in cross-section. The oral face (called trivium) is flat, and covered with numerous aligned podia. The tegument is thick, and covered with thick papillae and other tubercles. The oral tentacles are peltate, helping to collect the sediment to ingest.

== Species ==
- Thelenota ananas Jaeger, 1833 – Pineapple sea cucumber
- Thelenota anax Clark, 1921 – Giant sea cucumber
- Thelenota rubralineata Massin & Lane, 1991 – Red-lined sea cucumber
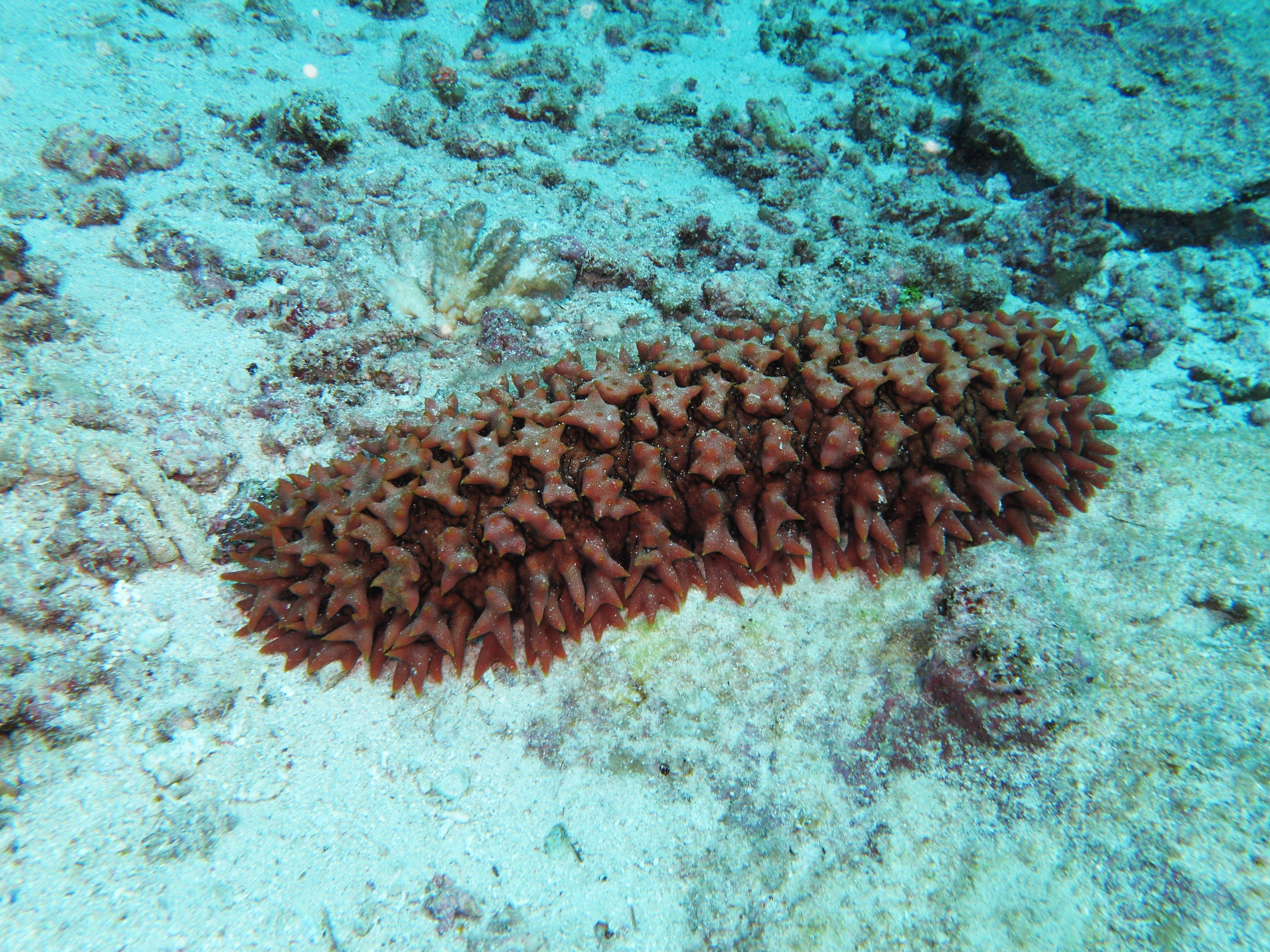
Thelenota ananas

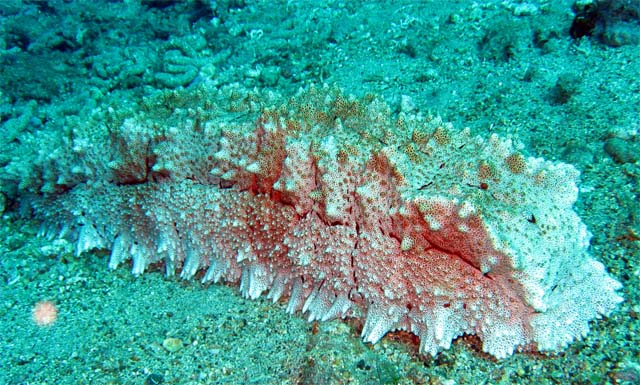
Thelenota anax

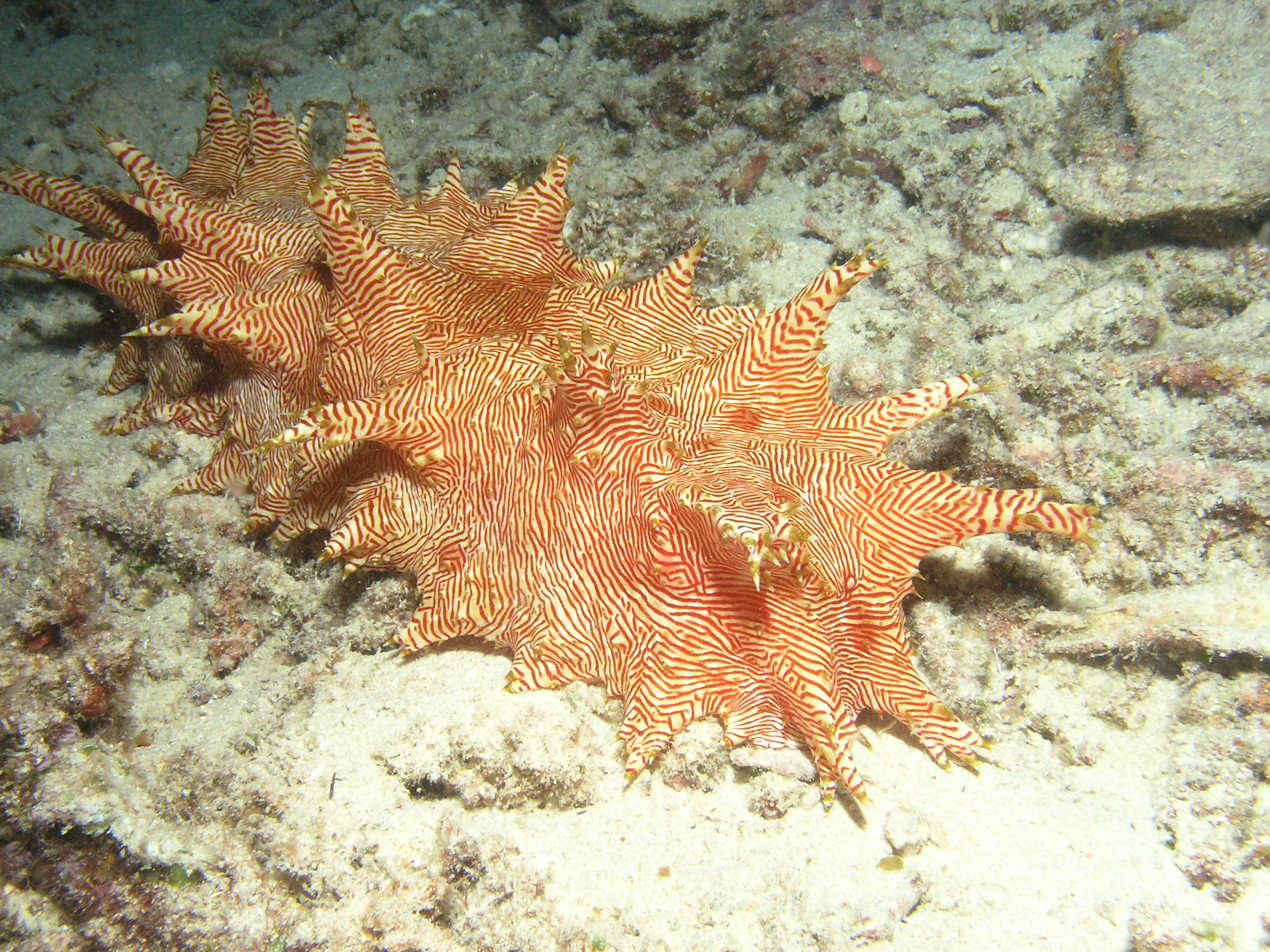
Thelenota rubralineata
