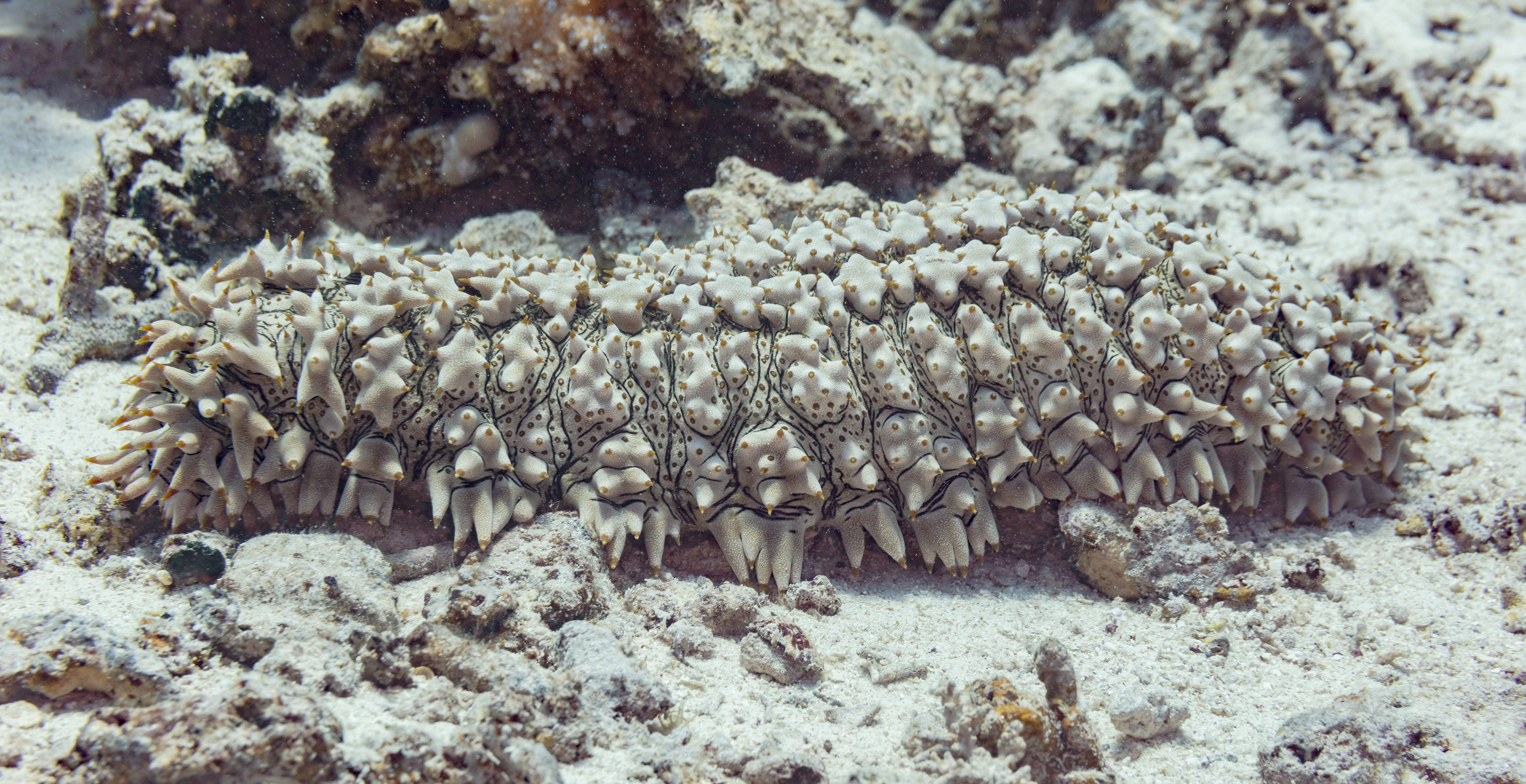

Conservation status
- Endangered (IUCN 3.1)

Scientific classification
- Kingdom: Animalia
- Phylum: Echinodermata
- Class: Holothuroidea
- Order: Synallactida
- Family: Stichopodidae
- Genus: Thelenota; Brandt, 1835
- Species: T. ananas

Binomial name
- Thelenota ananas Jaeger, 1833

= Thelenota ananas =

Species of sea cucumber

Thelenota ananas, also known as pineapple sea cucumber, oloturia ananas, tripang, prickly skin cucumber, pointed teat sea cucumber, armoured sea cucumber, giant sea cucumber, sand fish or prickly redfish, is a species of sea cucumber found in tropical Indo-Pacific waters from the Red Sea and East Africa to Hawaii, Polynesia, the Maldives and Australia.

== Description ==
Thelenota ananas (pineapple sea cucumber) is a species of sea cucumber characterized by its large size, warm colors, and pointed, star-shaped, spotted teats covering the entire body, grouped in rows of 2 or 3, as seen in Figure 1. Their body is reddish-orange in color, with the teats slightly darker. They are able to reach up to 70 cm (28 in) in length, with a weight of between 3–6 kg (6.6–13.2 lb), and have numerous large tube feet on the flat ventral side of their body. T. ananas is a slow growing organism.

== Environment ==
The environment of T. ananas is found in clean, sandy bottoms of lagoons with a depth of up to 30 m (98 ft), or in slabs near large coral heads and coral rubble, as depicted in Figure 2. They are typically located in seas surrounding India and in the Great Barrier Reef, Australia. The average water temperatures they thrive in are between 26–27 °C (79–81 °F). The individuals are large and found dispersed in low densities.

== Behavior ==
T. ananas are widely distributed, but tracking these organisms in a non-invasive and accurate way is somewhat difficult. Mark and recapture methods can be difficult because their bodies are extendable, so measuring their body has proven difficult to scientists since the numbers are ever-changing. The body wall of T. ananas cannot be tagged because it affects the growth of the organism, and are later shed off altogether. Scratching marks into the body wall induces short-term trauma and does not last long enough for mark and recapture efforts. These methods all harm T. ananas in some form, so the best non-invasive way to track their growth and traveling is through photographs.

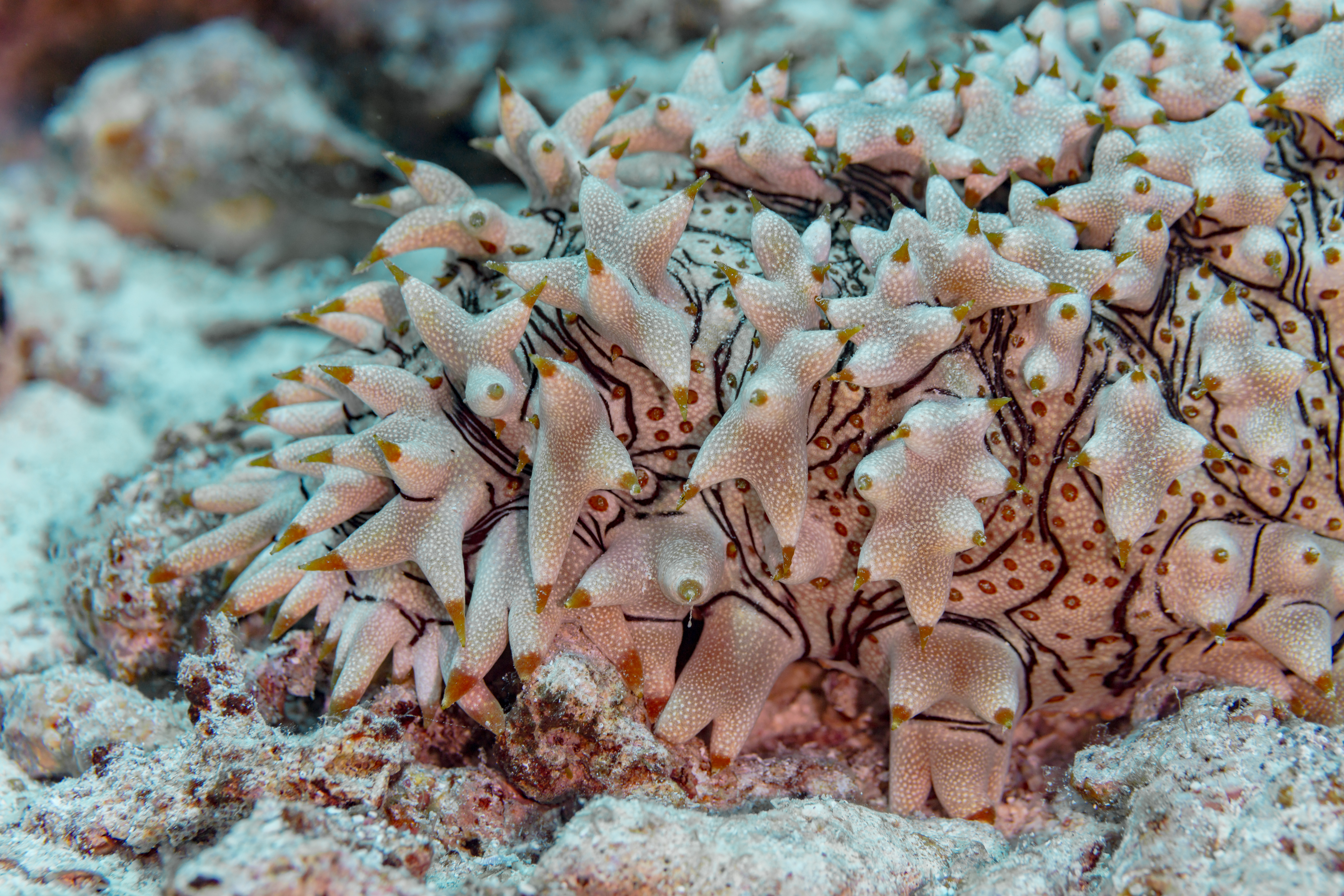
Detail of the head

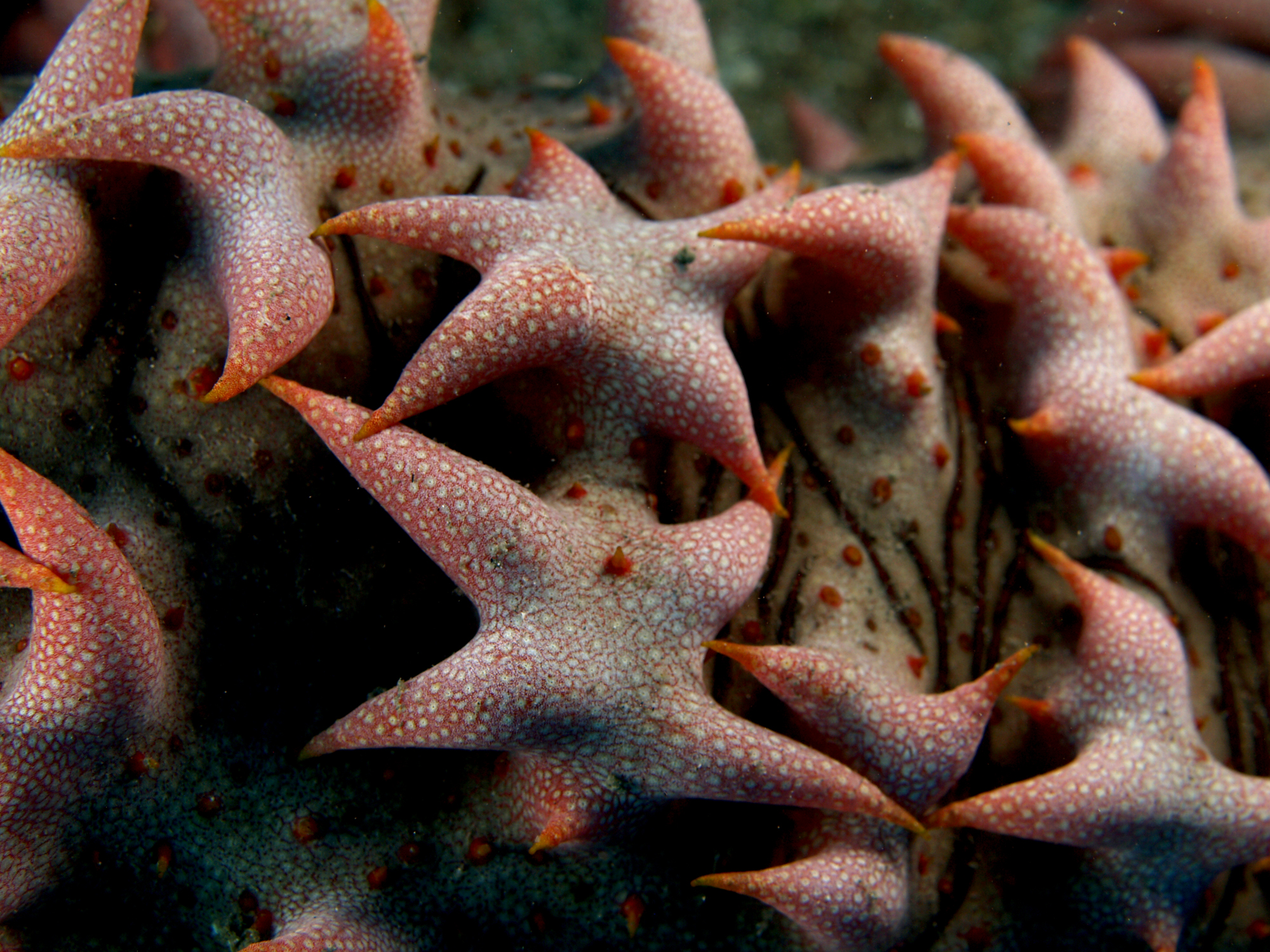
Figure 1. Close-up view of many teats on T. ananas

While generally considered sedentary, they have large tube feet hidden underneath their body which allow them to be highly mobile creatures and widely distributed. They are slow growing, but also longer lived and have lower mortality rates. T. ananas is diurnally active, meaning they're active during the day.

T. ananas plays an important role in coral reef ecosystems by recycling nutrients, bioturbating sediments, buffering sea water from ocean acidification to local scales, prey to a range of predators, and acting as a host for symbiotic biota.

== Parasites ==
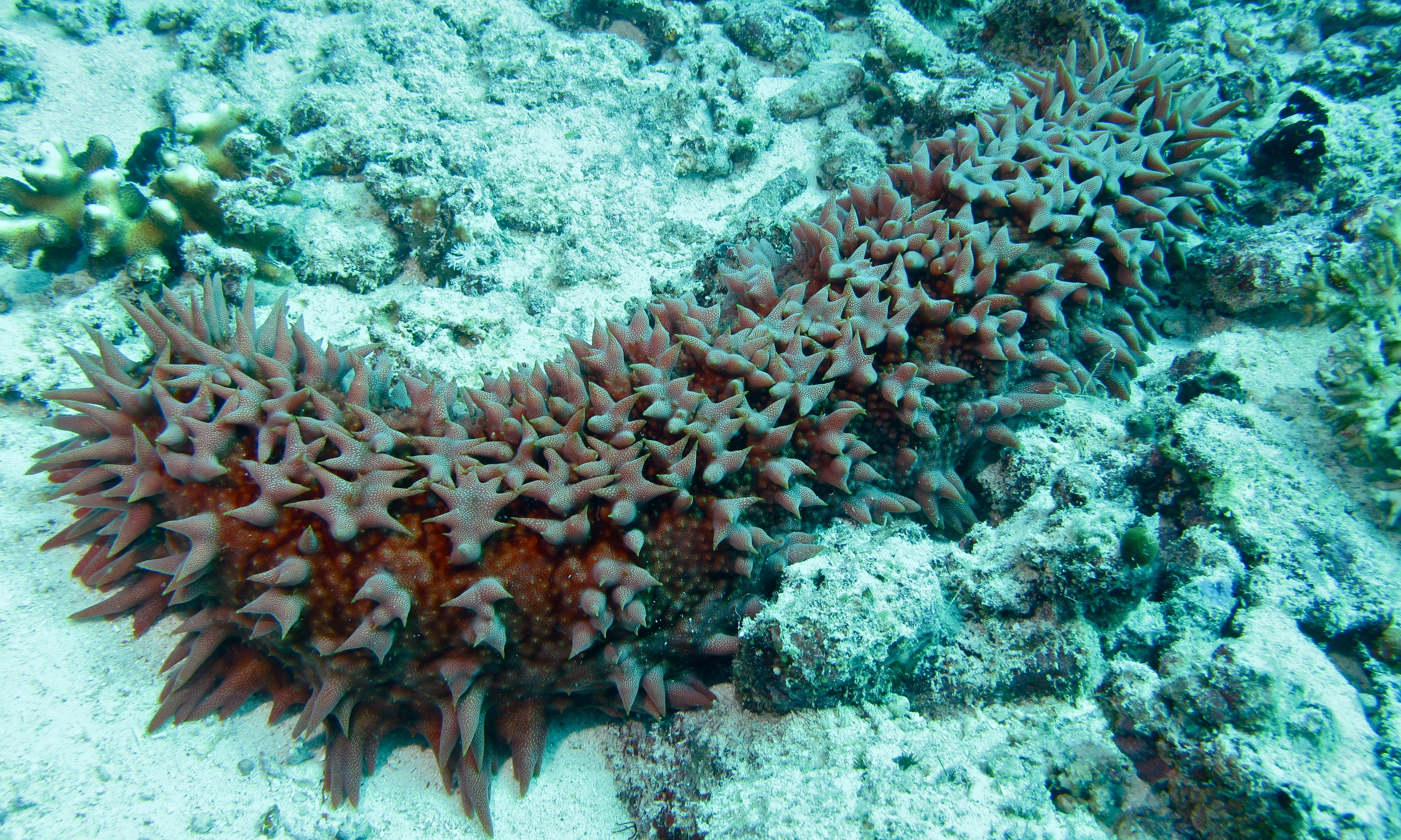
Figure 2. T. ananas in rocky habitat

T. ananas acts as a host to parasites identified as small siphonostome copepods within the genus Nanaspis. Arthur G. Humes of Boston University's Marine Program published research in 1973 that identified three new siphonostomes found on T. ananas. The research was conducted by collecting and isolating T. ananas, washing them with 5% ethyl alcohol in sea water, and then passing a very fine mesh net through the wash water to collect the parasites. In this study, most of the parasites collected, across all T. ananas, were female. It was also found that all three of these newly discovered species could occur on the same host at the same time, and are very similar in structure, leading to the theory that these three evolved from a common ancestor that was also associated with T. ananas in the past. As many as 847 adult parasites were collected from one single specimen.

Another parasite often found in this holothuroid is the worm pearlfish (Encheliophis vermicularis).

== Feeding ==
T. ananas feeds exclusively on calcareous alga Halimeda sp.

== As a food source ==
T. ananas is one of the most popular edible sea cucumber species consumed in China, and some other Southeast Asian countries. Consumption of T. ananas provides health benefits such as antioxidants, anti-inflammatory, anti-tumor, anti-proliferative, anti-coagulant, and anti-viral effects. Furthermore, sea cucumbers contain saponins, which can help regulate cholesterol metabolism, alleviate the development of obesity, hyperlipidemia, and diabetes.
