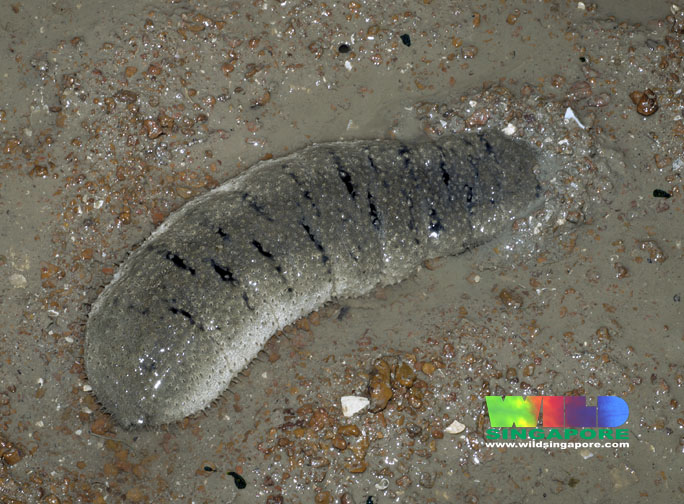

Conservation status
- Vulnerable (IUCN 3.1)

Scientific classification
- Kingdom: Animalia
- Phylum: Echinodermata
- Class: Holothuroidea
- Order: Holothuriida
- Family: Holothuriidae
- Genus: Holothuria
- Species: H. scabra

Binomial name
- Holothuria scabra Jaeger, 1833

Synonyms
- H. albida Savigny, 1867; H. gallensis Pearson, 1903; H. saecularis Bell, 1887; H. tigris Brandt, 1835

= Holothuria scabra =

Species of sea cucumber

Holothuria scabra, or sandfish, is a species of sea cucumber in the family Holothuriidae. It was placed in the subgenus Metriatyla by Rowe in 1969 and is the type species of the subgenus. Sandfish are harvested and processed into "beche-de-mer" and eaten in China and other Pacific coastal communities.

Sea cucumbers are marine invertebrates and are closely related to sea urchins and starfish. All these groups tend to have radial symmetry and have a water vascular system that operates by hydrostatic pressure, enabling them to move around by use of many suckers known as tube feet. Sea cucumbers are usually leathery, gherkin-shaped animals with a cluster of feeding tentacles at one end surrounding the mouth.

== Anatomy and morphology ==
The sandfish has the same basic anatomy as most other species of sea cucumber. Their bodies are elongated and cylindric, and relatively stubby. Their dorsal side can range in color from a grey-brown to black, with darkened wrinkles across the body and small black papillae from end to end. They are counter shaded with a lighter ventral side, which is relatively flat. They have a mouth located on the ventral surface at one end of the body, considered the front end. Like other sea cucumbers, they use feeding tentacles which protrude from the mouth. Sandfish have around 20 short tentacles. On the opposite end the anus is found on the dorsal side. They can grow up to an average length of 22 cm with the largest reaching up to 40 cm, and reach maturity around 16 cm or 200 grams with some growing as much as 300 grams in one year. It is unknown how long they live undisturbed, but they can live to at least 10 years.

Their gonads are found through a single genital orifice on their dorsal anterior end. Their digestive system is made up of a mouth, an esophagus, a stomach, an intestine, a cloaca, and an anus. They extend respiratory trees from their cloaca in order to breathe. Their body wall is thick, making up a total of 56% of their weight. This body wall is filled with calcareous plates called spicules, and are used to ID species; the sandfish is identified by table and knobbed button shapes. Like other sea cucumbers, they can eviscerate their internal organs if they undergo stress, and can regenerate their organs; in sandfish this takes about 2 months.

=== Life cycle ===
The sandfish goes through 6 stages of growth before maturing into an adult. This starts when the adults spawn. After a day the fertilized eggs develop into a first planktonic phase, a gastrula, then after two days it becomes an auricularia, the feeding planktonic stage. Within the next 14 days the sandfish will enter a non-feeding doliolaria stage and a final planktonic pentactula stage, before becoming juveniles and settling into the sea grass meadows to mature.

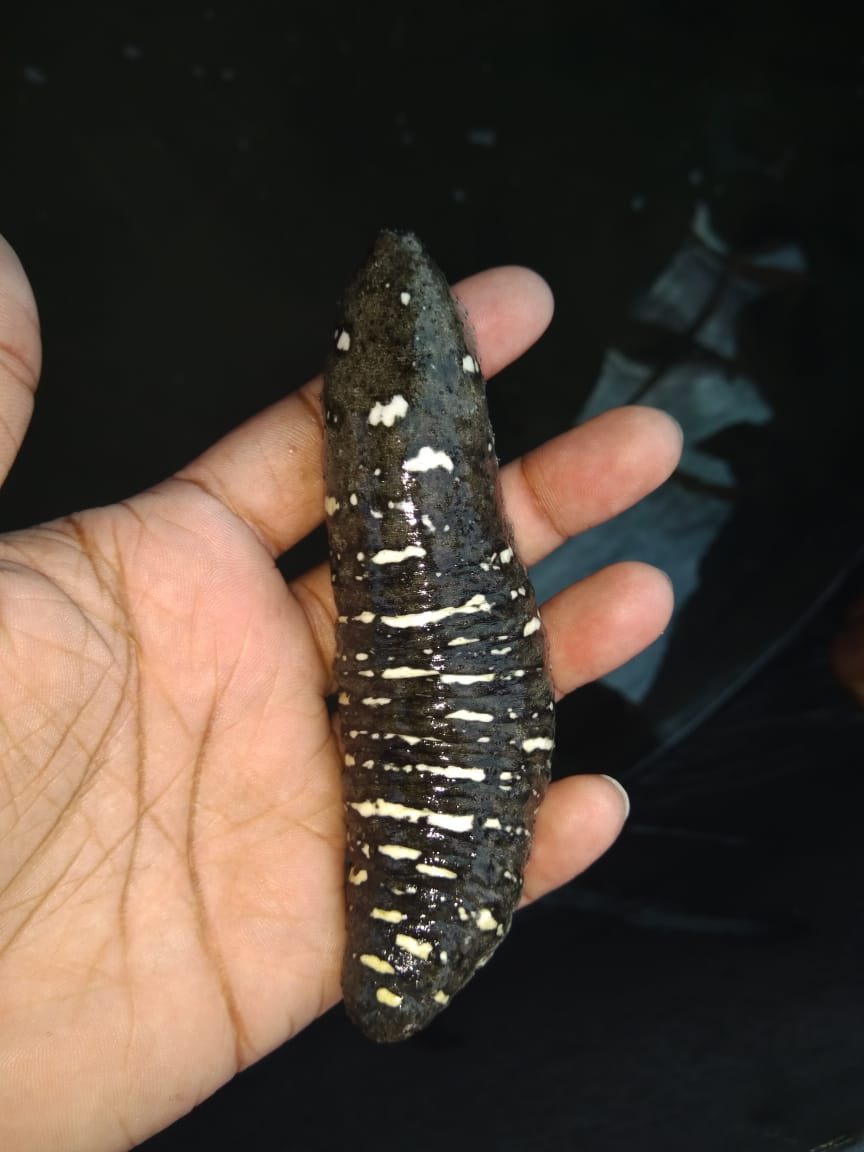
from Trincomalee, Sri Lanka

== Ecology ==
=== Distribution ===
The species can be found in the Indo-Pacific region, from east Africa to the eastern Pacific. Some have been found in the Persian Gulf, Iran. They are typically restricted to latitudes between 30° N to 30° S, due to it being a tropical species.

=== Habitat ===
The sandfish inhabits shallow tropical waters, <20 m deep. They prefer seagrass meadows and muddy bottomed substrata with high nutrient levels due to their diet preference. They do have a tolerance for lowered salinity, down to 20 ppt, such as that found in brackish water. Sandfish play a key role in the health of their habitat; like most sea cucumbers H. scabra are bioturbators and play a key role in reworking the sediment and ensuring that organic matter is evenly distributed for the ecosystem to function, and have a subsequent diet of detritus and other microorganisms.

== Behavior ==
The sandfish exhibits some distinct behaviors. Their burrowing behavior varies as they mature, with younger sandfish responding to changes in light and coming out in darkness. Older sandfish are more sensitive to changes in temperature and will burrow to escape the cold. Sandfish are particular about sediment size and type, settling in fine sand and muddy substrates high in nutrients. Like all sea cumbers, H. scabra exhibits defensive vomiting, where they expel their internal organs to distract predators while they escape. Male and females have distinct mating behaviors; when they spawn males erect their bodies and sway from side to side as they release sperm into the surrounding water. Shortly after, females will erect their bodies and send eggs into the water with the sperm in a short, forceful burst.

== Use as food ==
The sandfish has been eaten by man for over 1000 years. About twenty other species of sea cucumber are also consumed but the sandfish is the species most often used. In the 1990s it was being sold dried as beche-de-mer for up to US$100 per kilogram. Harvesting sandfish from the sea is known as trepanging in Indonesia. In many areas the fisheries have declined over the years because of over fishing, so ranching, aquaculture and hatchery rearing are being attempted.

== Aquaculture ==
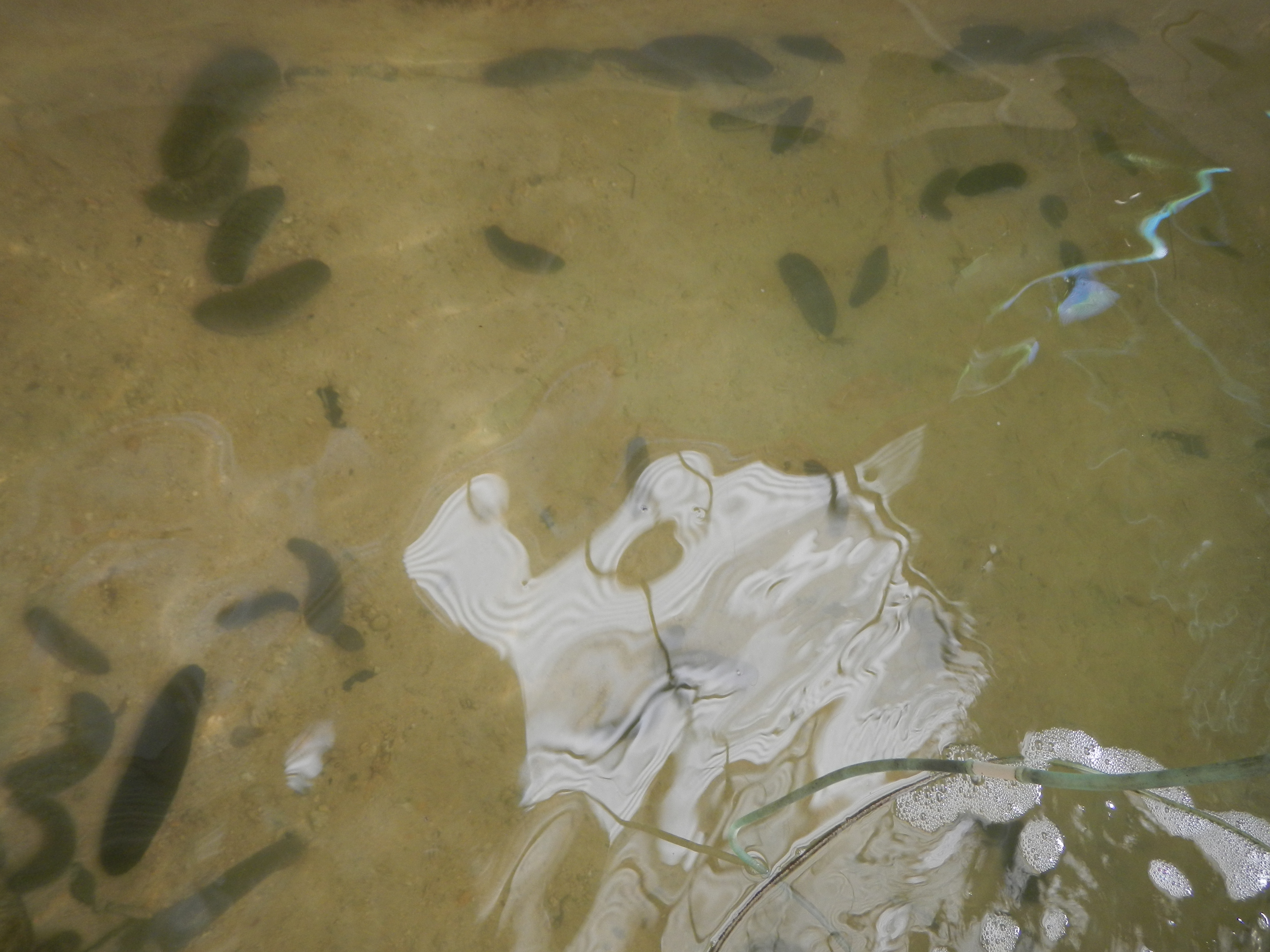
The Philippine "Balatan", or sea cucumber breeding/harvesting

The sandfish has a high value in Asian markets where they are sold as beche-de-mer for food. This makes them a key species for aquaculture production, where the species flourishes; one of the only tropical holothurian species to do so. They are also valuable in aquaculture for habitat restocking; juveniles are often grown in tanks and released into the wild with hopes of restocking the wild population and causing a spillover effect in protected areas. Broodstock is the population of adults that will be used for reproduction. These are gathered from wild stocks and since the sandfish is found in environments close to the equator, they can spawn year round. Peak season for spawning though is typically during the dry seasons, August to November. Approximately 30–45 adult sandfish are required to start a small batch of spawning individuals. Spawning for H. scabra is closely related to the lunar cycle, and will occur in the afternoon to early evening. Spawning can be induced using several methods: thermal stimulation involves increasing and decreasing water temperatures rapidly, dry treatment involves leaving the sandfish out of the water for 30–45 minutes before being returned to the tanks, and the food stimulant method involves providing a highly concentrated amount of algae to the water to overfeed the sandfish. Gonad extraction is also an option but requires the dissection of the animal. It is common in most aquaculture facilities to use a combination of the listed methods, in order to ensure spawning. The sandfish larvae are closely monitored in order to ensure survival, as they are temperamental and require specific conditions for success. Once the larvae develop into juveniles they must be moved into growout tanks, at a density of 200-500 individuals per square meter to ensure that each one is receiving proper space to grow and the required nutrients.

=== Cocultures ===
Due to its hardy nature, the sandfish is a good species for cocultures with other species. They are able to reuse waste material from other organisms and make nutrients usable. The following species have been kept in tanks with H. scabra:

- Black tiger prawn, Penaeus monodon
- Red seaweed, Kappaphycus striatum
- Blue shrimp, Litopenaeus stylirostris

== Parasites ==
The worm pearlfish (Encheliophis vermicularis) is a parasite of this species and each parasitised Holothuria scabra will host a male and female pair of the fish which live inside its body.

== Conservation status ==
The sandfish is listed as an endangered with populations declining by the IUCN Red List. They face threats from over harvesting, but efforts are currently being taken around the Indo-Pacific including bans on the fishery and restocking via aquaculture efforts.
