= Oligodentatus =

Scientific classification
- Kingdom: Animalia
- Phylum: Arthropoda
- Subphylum: Chelicerata
- Class: Arachnida
- Order: Mesostigmata
- Family: Digamasellidae
- Genus: Oligodentatus; Shcherbak, 1980

Genus of mites

Oligodentatus is a genus of mites in the family Digamasellidae. There are at least four described species in Oligodentatus.

== Species ==
These four species belong to the genus Oligodentatus:

- Oligodentatus certus Barilo, 1989
- Oligodentatus fimetarius (Karg, 1965)
- Oligodentatus shcherbakae Barilo, 1989
- Oligodentatus tridentatus Shcherbak & Bregetova, 1980
