= Cobelura wappesi =

Scientific classification
- Kingdom: Animalia
- Phylum: Arthropoda
- Class: Insecta
- Order: Coleoptera
- Suborder: Polyphaga
- Infraorder: Cucujiformia
- Family: Cerambycidae
- Genus: Cobelura
- Species: C. wappesi

Binomial name
- Cobelura wappesi Corbett, 2004

Species of beetle

Cobelura is a species of longhorn beetle of the subfamily Lamiinae. It was described by Corbett in 2004, and is known from Costa Rica and Ecuador.
