= Longoseius =

Scientific classification
- Domain: Eukaryota
- Kingdom: Animalia
- Phylum: Arthropoda
- Subphylum: Chelicerata
- Class: Arachnida
- Order: Mesostigmata
- Family: Digamasellidae
- Genus: Longoseius; Chant, 1961

Genus of mites

Longoseius is a genus of mites in the family Digamasellidae. There are about nine described species in Longoseius.

== Species ==
These nine species belong to the genus Longoseius:

- Longoseius aberrans (Hirschmann, 1960)
- Longoseius brachypoda (Hurlbutt, 1967)
- Longoseius cuniculus Chant, 1961
- Longoseius longuloides Hirschmann & Wisniewski, 1982
- Longoseius longulus (Hirschmann, 1960)
- Longoseius longus (Hirschmann, 1954)
- Longoseius nobilis (Barilo, 1989)
- Longoseius ornatosimilis (Shcherbak, 1980)
- Longoseius ornatus (Hirschmann, 1960)
