= Dendroseius =

Scientific classification
- Kingdom: Animalia
- Phylum: Arthropoda
- Subphylum: Chelicerata
- Class: Arachnida
- Order: Mesostigmata
- Family: Digamasellidae
- Genus: Dendroseius; Karg, 1965

Genus of mites

Dendroseius is a genus of mites in the family Digamasellidae. There are about eight described species in Dendroseius.

== Species ==
These eight species belong to the genus Dendroseius:

- Dendroseius amoliensis Faraji, Sakenin-Chelav & Karg, 2006
- Dendroseius badenhorsti (Ryke, 1962)
- Dendroseius congoensis Wisniewski & Hirschmann, 1992
- Dendroseius gujarati Wisniewski & Hirschmann, 1989
- Dendroseius reductus Mašán, 2020
- Dendroseius reticulatus (Sheals, 1956)
- Dendroseius scotarius (Sheals, 1958)
- Dendroseius vulgaris Ma et al., 2014
