= Pontiolaelaps =

Scientific classification
- Kingdom: Animalia
- Phylum: Arthropoda
- Subphylum: Chelicerata
- Class: Arachnida
- Order: Mesostigmata
- Family: Digamasellidae
- Genus: Pontiolaelaps; Luxton, 1989

Genus of mites

Pontiolaelaps is a genus of mites in the family Digamasellidae. There are at least three described species in Pontiolaelaps.

== Species ==
These three species belong to the genus Pontiolaelaps:

- Pontiolaelaps crenatus (Luxton, 1984)
- Pontiolaelaps salinus Luxton, 1989
- Pontiolaelaps terebratus (Luxton, 1984)
