= Cobelura sergioi =

Scientific classification
- Kingdom: Animalia
- Phylum: Arthropoda
- Class: Insecta
- Order: Coleoptera
- Suborder: Polyphaga
- Infraorder: Cucujiformia
- Family: Cerambycidae
- Genus: Cobelura
- Species: C. sergioi

Binomial name
- Cobelura sergioi Monné, 1984

Species of beetle

Cobelura sergioi is a species of longhorn beetle of the subfamily Lamiinae. It was described by Monné in 1984, and is known from eastern Ecuador.
