= Orientolaelaps =

Scientific classification
- Kingdom: Animalia
- Phylum: Arthropoda
- Subphylum: Chelicerata
- Class: Arachnida
- Order: Mesostigmata
- Family: Digamasellidae
- Genus: Orientolaelaps; Bregetova & Shcherbak, 1977

Genus of mites

Orientolaelaps is a genus of mites in the family Digamasellidae.

== Species ==
- Orientolaelaps eutamiasi Bregetova & Shcherbak, 1977
