= Cobelura howdenorum =

Scientific classification
- Kingdom: Animalia
- Phylum: Arthropoda
- Class: Insecta
- Order: Coleoptera
- Suborder: Polyphaga
- Infraorder: Cucujiformia
- Family: Cerambycidae
- Genus: Cobelura
- Species: C. howdenorum

Binomial name
- Cobelura howdenorum Corbett, 2004

Species of beetle

Cobelura howdenorum is a species of longhorn beetles of the subfamily Lamiinae. It was described by Corbett in 2004, and is known from Colombia.
