= Cobelura vermicularis =

Scientific classification
- Kingdom: Animalia
- Phylum: Arthropoda
- Class: Insecta
- Order: Coleoptera
- Suborder: Polyphaga
- Infraorder: Cucujiformia
- Family: Cerambycidae
- Genus: Cobelura
- Species: C. vermicularis

Binomial name
- Cobelura vermicularis Kirsch, 1889

Species of beetle

Cobelura vermicularis is a species of longhorn beetle of the subfamily Lamiinae. It was described by Theodor Franz Wilhelm Kirsch in 1889 and is known from Ecuador.
