= Panteniphis mirandus =

Scientific classification
- Domain: Eukaryota
- Kingdom: Animalia
- Phylum: Arthropoda
- Subphylum: Chelicerata
- Class: Arachnida
- Order: Mesostigmata
- Family: Ascidae
- Genus: Panteniphis
- Species: P. mirandus

Binomial name
- Panteniphis mirandus Willmann, 1949

Species of mite

Panteniphis mirandus is a species of mite in the family Ascidae.
