= Panteniphis =

Scientific classification
- Domain: Eukaryota
- Kingdom: Animalia
- Phylum: Arthropoda
- Subphylum: Chelicerata
- Class: Arachnida
- Order: Mesostigmata
- Family: Ascidae
- Genus: Panteniphis; Willmann, 1949

Genus of mites

Panteniphis is a genus of mites in the family Digamasellidae. There are at least four described species in Panteniphis.

== Species ==
These four species belong to the genus Panteniphis:

- Panteniphis africanus Genis, Loots & Ryke, 1969
- Panteniphis athiasae Hirschmann, 1983
- Panteniphis mirandus Willmann, 1949
- Panteniphis tanzaniae Hirschmann, 1983
