= Lindquistoseius =

Scientific classification
- Domain: Eukaryota
- Kingdom: Animalia
- Phylum: Arthropoda
- Subphylum: Chelicerata
- Class: Arachnida
- Order: Mesostigmata
- Family: Ologamasidae
- Genus: Lindquistoseius; Genis, Loots & Ryke, 1969

Genus of mites

Lindquistoseius is a genus of mites in the family Ologamasidae.
