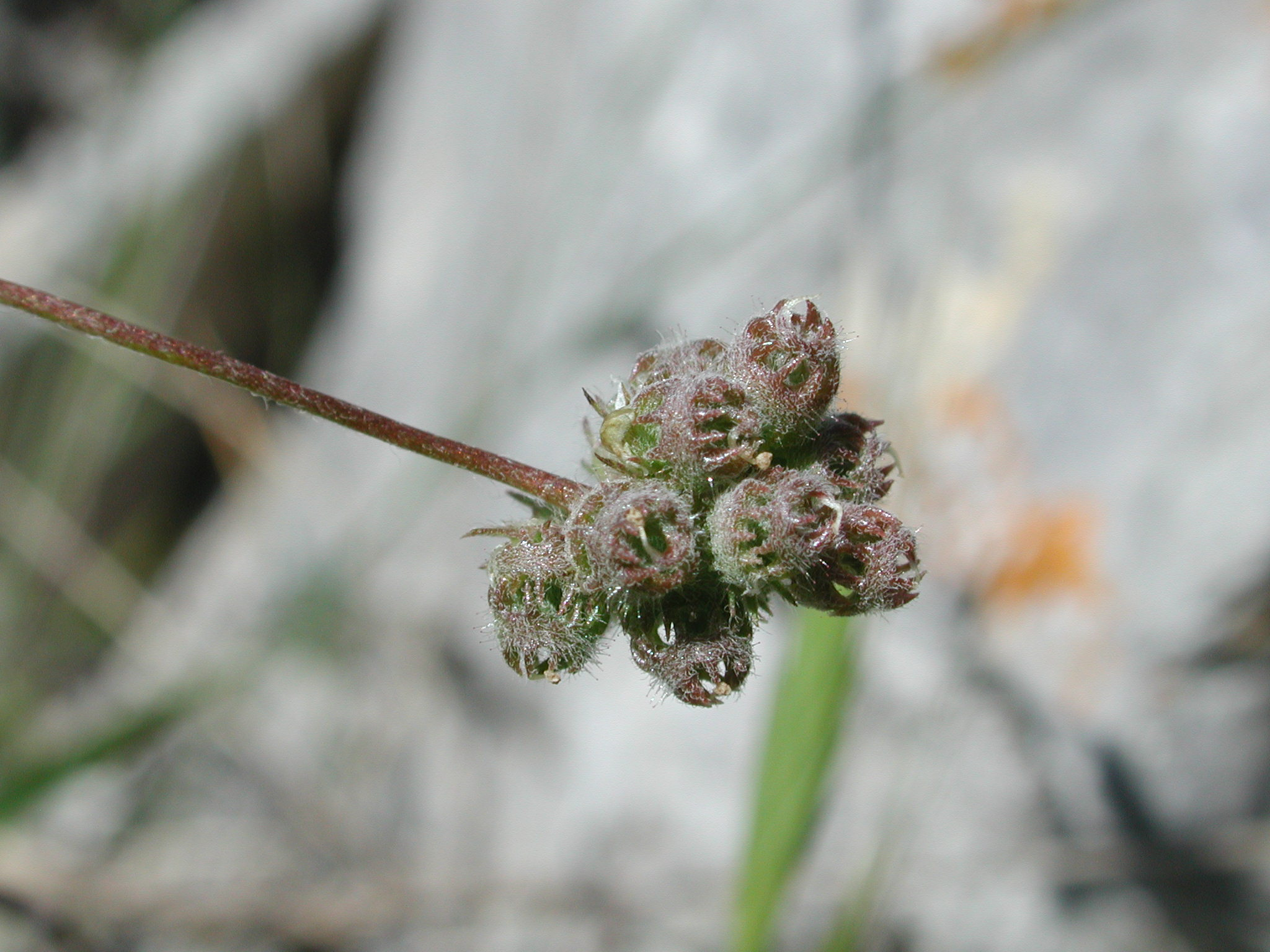

Scientific classification
- Kingdom: Plantae
- Clade: Tracheophytes
- Clade: Angiosperms
- Clade: Eudicots
- Clade: Rosids
- Order: Fabales
- Family: Fabaceae
- Subfamily: Faboideae
- Genus: Medicago
- Species: M. coronata

Binomial name
- Medicago coronata (L.) Bartal.

Synonyms
- Medicago polymorpha var. coronata L.; Medicago vermicularis Cesati

= Medicago coronata =

Species of legume

Medicago coronata, the crown medick, is a plant species of the genus Medicago. It is found throughout the Mediterranean basin. It forms a symbiotic relationship with the bacterium Sinorhizobium meliloti, which is capable of nitrogen fixation.
