= Worm pearlfish =

Conservation status
- Least Concern (IUCN 3.1)

Scientific classification
- Kingdom: Animalia
- Phylum: Chordata
- Class: Actinopterygii
- Division: Teleostei
- Order: Ophidiiformes
- Family: Carapidae
- Genus: Encheliophis
- Species: E. vermicularis

Binomial name
- Encheliophis vermicularis J. P. Müller, 1842

Synonyms
- Encheliophis jordani Heller & Snodgrass, 1903; Encheliophiops hancocki Reid, 1940; Encheliophis hancocki (Reid, 1940)

Species of fish

The worm pearlfish (Encheliophis vermicularis) is an eel-like fish in the family Carapidae.

== Description ==
The worm pearlfish is typically 15 cm long and is characterized by its long, slender body and lack of scales.

== Morphology ==
Worm pearlfish lack the pectoral or pelvic fins that are common characters of the family Carapidae. The upper half of its body is blackish-pinkish in color and its underside is silver. Its tail is black and tapered.

Compared to other members of the family Carapidae, the worm pearlfish has a relatively weak jaw. The maxillaries and premaxillaries in worm pearlfishes are joined by short connective fibers in the small mouth opening. Both the maxillaries and premaxillaries are connected to the fish's skin, which creates a small mouth opening. Worm pearlfishes' mouths are smaller and weaker than mouths of pearlfishes in other genera because they feed on soft, unresisting food in a confined space, as opposed to swift-moving, unconstrained prey. Their upper jaw is lined with an outside row of strong, curved teeth, and an inner row of conical teeth. Worm pearlfishes' lower jaws contain one row of 20 conical teeth or more. Teeth are arranged in a cardiform (comb-like) design – Parmentier suggests they are used in a saw-like fashion to cut into internal tissues of their hosts.

== Habitat and range ==
E. vermicularis lives in a marine, reef-based environment in a tropical climate. They are an epibenthic species – they live near to the bottom of the seafloor. They seek out shallow-water sea cucumbers around in inshore waters and coral reefs which range in depth from 0-30 meters.

They can be found in the Indo-Pacific, the Gulf of Aden, around the Philippines and Society Islands, and north to the Ryukyus to the eastern Pacific.

== Diet ==
The worm pearlfish is a parasite of holothurians, with each host normally home to a pair of these fishes. Species recorded as hosting the worm pearlfish include Holothuria leucospilota, H. scabra, H. lubrica and Thelenota ananas. The worm pearlfish is an uncommon species.

While other members of the family Carpidae can be commensal, most members of the genus Encheliophis are obligately parasitic. Worm pearlfish, specifically, prefer the coelomic cavity of the genus Holothuria (sea cucumbers). In particular, worm pearlfish have been found to prefer the sea cucumber species H. leucospilota, though they have been found in the sea cucumber species Holothuria atra as well.

Worm pearlfish feed exclusively on the internal tissue of the host, entering through the anal region of the sea cucumber without causing the sea cucumber to release its Cuvierian tubules – a defense mechanism which entangles possible predators. The pearlfish appears to be chemotaxic (responsive to chemical gradients in water) and is attracted to chemicals the coelomic fluid and Cuvierian tubules, which leads it to the sea cucumber's anus. Because the other species worm pearlfish prey on, H. atra, lack Cuvierian tubules, worm pearlfish are most likely not only attracted by the Cuvierian tubules. The anus of the sea cucumber contracts upon tactile stimulation by the worm pearlfish, but once it needs to respire and relax the anus again, pearlfish is able to penetrate the anus headfirst. Once inside, the worm pearlfish eats the sea cucumber's internal tissues – mostly the gonads.

== Reproduction and life cycle ==
Not much is known about the sexual behavior of worm pearlfish. Sexually mature male-female pairs of worm pearlfish been found cohabiting in sea cucumbers, so worm pearlfish are thought to mate and spawn inside their hosts. Larvae may then be expelled by the normal expiration of the sea cucumber. Like all members of the family Carapidae, worm pearlfish are hatched as holoplanktonic – i.e. temporarily planktonic – larvae from planktonic elliptical eggs, but it is unclear if spawning is seasonal or sporadic.
