= Coelogyne vermicularis =

Scientific classification
- Kingdom: Plantae
- Clade: Embryophytes
- Clade: Tracheophytes
- Clade: Angiosperms
- Clade: Monocots
- Order: Asparagales
- Family: Orchidaceae
- Subfamily: Epidendroideae
- Tribe: Arethuseae
- Genus: Coelogyne
- Species: C. vermicularis

Binomial name
- Coelogyne vermicularis J.J.Sm.

Synonyms
- Chelonistele vermicularis (J.J.Sm.) Kraenzl.

Species of orchid

Coelogyne vermicularis is a species of orchid in the genus Coelogyne.
