= Dendrolaelaps =

Scientific classification
- Domain: Eukaryota
- Kingdom: Animalia
- Phylum: Arthropoda
- Subphylum: Chelicerata
- Class: Arachnida
- Order: Mesostigmata
- Family: Digamasellidae
- Genus: Dendrolaelaps; Halbert, 1915

Diversity
- at least 170 species

Synonyms
- Apophyseodendrolaelaps Hirschmann & Wisniewski, 1982; Cornodendrolaelaps W.Hirschmann & Wiśniewski, 1982; Daeleidendrolaelaps Wisniewski & Hirschmann, 1990; Dendrolaelaspis Lindquist, 1975; Disetodendrolaelaps Hirschmann & Wisniewski, 1982; Duplodendrolaelaps Wisniewski & Hirschmann, 1991; Epistodendrolaelaps Hirschmann & Wisniewski, 1982; Foveodendrolaelaps Hirschmann & Wisniewski, 1982; Insectolaelaps Shcherbak, 1980; Ipidodendrolaelaps Hirschmann & Wisniewski, 1982; Luxtondendrolaelaps Wisniewski & Hirschmann, 1989; Majestidendrolaelaps Wisniewski & Hirschmann, 1989; Monodendrolaelaps Wisniewski & Hirschmann, 1989; Multidendrolaelaps Hirschmann, 1974; Oligodentatus Shcherbak, 1980; Presepodendrolaelaps Hirschmann & Wisniewski, 1982; Punctodendrolaelaps Hirschmann & Wiśniewski, 1982; Sellnickidendrolaelaps Hirschmann & Wisniewski, 1982; Stanidendrolaelaps Wisniewski & Hirschmann, 1993; Xylodendrolaelaps Wisniewski & Hirschmann, 1993

Genus of mites

Dendrolaelaps is a genus of mites in the family Digamasellidae. There are more than 170 described species in Dendrolaelaps.

The genus was first described in 1915 by James Nathaniel Halbert.

== Species ==
- Dendrolaelaps aberratus Hirschmann & Wisniewski, 1984
- Dendrolaelaps abietis Hirschmann, 1960
- Dendrolaelaps acornutosimilis Hirschmann, 1960
- Dendrolaelaps acornutus Hirschmann, 1960
- Dendrolaelaps adelaideae Womersley, 1954
- Dendrolaelaps aegypticus Metwally & Mersal, 1985
- Dendrolaelaps angulosus (Willmann, 1936)
- Dendrolaelaps apophyseosimilis Hirschmann, 1960
- Dendrolaelaps apophyseus Hirschmann, 1960
- Dendrolaelaps arenarioides Hirschmann & Wisniewski, 1982
- Dendrolaelaps arenarius Karg, 1971
- Dendrolaelaps armatus Hirschmann, 1960
- Dendrolaelaps arvicolus (Leitner, 1949)
- Dendrolaelaps australicornutus Hirschmann, 1972
- Dendrolaelaps baixuelii Ma, 1997
- Dendrolaelaps balazyi Hirschmann & Wisniewski, 1982
- Dendrolaelaps bengalensis Pramanik & Raychaudhuri, 1978
- Dendrolaelaps bhattacharyyai Hirschmann, 1974
- Dendrolaelaps bidentatus Van Daele, 1977
- Dendrolaelaps bisetus (Berlese, 1891)
- Dendrolaelaps brasiliensis Wisniewski & Hirschmann, 1984
- Dendrolaelaps brevipilis (Leitner, 1949)
- Dendrolaelaps brevipiloides Hirschmann & Wisniewski, 1982
- Dendrolaelaps camponoti Wisniewski & Hirschmann, 1983
- Dendrolaelaps capensis (Berlese, 1920)
- Dendrolaelaps carolinensis McGraw & Farrier, 1969
- Dendrolaelaps casualis Huhta & Karg, 2010
- Dendrolaelaps coleopterophilus (Hirschmann, 1954)
- Dendrolaelaps comatus Hirschmann, 1960
- Dendrolaelaps cornutodaelei Hirschmann & Wisniewski, 1982
- Dendrolaelaps cornutohirschmanni Wisniewski, 1979
- Dendrolaelaps cornutulus Hirschmann, 1960
- Dendrolaelaps cornutus (Kramer, 1886)
- Dendrolaelaps crassipes (Schweizer, 1961)
- Dendrolaelaps crassitarsalis (Willmann, 1951)
- Dendrolaelaps cubae Wisniewski & Hirschmann, 1993
- Dendrolaelaps cylindricus (Berlese, 1918)
- Dendrolaelaps debilipes (Berlese, 1920)
- Dendrolaelaps disetosimilis Hirschmann, 1960
- Dendrolaelaps disetus (Hirschmann, 1954)
- Dendrolaelaps doljensis Wisniewski & Hirschmann, 1991
- Dendrolaelaps duplodens Wisniewski & Hirschmann, 1991
- Dendrolaelaps eichhorni Wisniewski, 1980
- Dendrolaelaps elaterophilus (Hirschmann, 1954)
- Dendrolaelaps euarmatus Hirschmann, 1960
- Dendrolaelaps fageticola (Schmölzer, 1995)
- Dendrolaelaps fallacoides Hirschmann & Wisniewski, 1982
- Dendrolaelaps fallax (Leitner, 1949)
- Dendrolaelaps forcipiformis Hirschmann, 1960
- Dendrolaelaps formicarius (Huhta & Karg, 2010)
- Dendrolaelaps fossilis Hirschmann, 1971
- Dendrolaelaps foveolatosimilis Hirschmann, 1960
- Dendrolaelaps foveolatus (Leitner, 1949)
- Dendrolaelaps frenzeli (Willmann, 1936)
- Dendrolaelaps fukikoae Ishikawa, 1977
- Dendrolaelaps glareoli Wisniewski & Hirschmann, 1984
- Dendrolaelaps halaskovae Schmölzer, 1995
- Dendrolaelaps halophilus (Willmann, 1951)
- Dendrolaelaps heterotrichus Hirschmann, 1960
- Dendrolaelaps hunteri Wisniewski, 1979
- Dendrolaelaps hurlbutti Hirschmann & Wisniewski, 1982
- Dendrolaelaps imitopraetarsalis Ma & Lin, 2005
- Dendrolaelaps insignis Hirschmann, 1960
- Dendrolaelaps isochetus Shcherbak & Bregetova, 1980
- Dendrolaelaps krantzi Wisniewski, 1979
- Dendrolaelaps laetus Shcherbak, 1980
- Dendrolaelaps langi Hirschmann & Wisniewski, 1984
- Dendrolaelaps lasiophilus Hirschmann, 1960
- Dendrolaelaps latior (Leitner, 1949)
- Dendrolaelaps latioroides Hirschmann & Wisniewski, 1982
- Dendrolaelaps latoides Hirschmann & Wisniewski, 1982
- Dendrolaelaps latus Hirschmann, 1960
- Dendrolaelaps lemani (Schweizer, 1961)
- Dendrolaelaps lindquisti Wisniewski, 1979
- Dendrolaelaps liujingyuani Ma, 2008
- Dendrolaelaps longiductus Wisniewski & Hirschmann, 1993
- Dendrolaelaps longifallax Hirschmann, 1960
- Dendrolaelaps longiusculus (Leitner, 1949)
- Dendrolaelaps louisianae Hirschmann & Wisniewski, 1982
- Dendrolaelaps lusikisikiae Hirschmann & Wisniewski, 1984
- Dendrolaelaps luxtoni Wisniewski & Hirschmann, 1989
- Dendrolaelaps macfarlanei (Ryke, 1962)
- Dendrolaelaps magnus Wisniewski & Hirschmann, 1993
- Dendrolaelaps majesticus Wisniewski & Hirschmann, 1989
- Dendrolaelaps markewitschi Shcherbak, 1980
- Dendrolaelaps marylandae (Hurlbutt, 1967)
- Dendrolaelaps medius Shcherbak, 1980
- Dendrolaelaps metwallyi El-Halawany & Abdel-Samad, 1991
- Dendrolaelaps modestus Barilo, 1989
- Dendrolaelaps monodentatus Wisniewski & Hirschmann, 1989
- Dendrolaelaps monoufiensis Sweelam & Nasreldin, 2017
- Dendrolaelaps moseri (Hurlbutt, 1967)
- Dendrolaelaps moserisimilis Shcherbak, 1984
- Dendrolaelaps myiaphilus (Karg, 2002)
- Dendrolaelaps myrmecophilus Hirschmann, 1960
- Dendrolaelaps natans (Pintchuk, 1972)
- Dendrolaelaps neocornutus (Hurlbutt, 1967)
- Dendrolaelaps neodisetosimilis McGraw & Farrier, 1969
- Dendrolaelaps neodisetus (Hurlbutt, 1967)
- Dendrolaelaps neozwoelferi Hirschmann, 1983
- Dendrolaelaps nikolai Shcherbak, 1978
- Dendrolaelaps ningxiaensis Ma & Bai, 2009
- Dendrolaelaps nostricornutus Hirschmann & Wisniewski, 1982
- Dendrolaelaps oblitus Hirschmann & Wisniewski, 1982
- Dendrolaelaps oligochetus Shcherbak, 1980
- Dendrolaelaps ophidiotrichus Luxton, 1982
- Dendrolaelaps opticus Barilo, 1989
- Dendrolaelaps oudemansi Halbert, 1915
- Dendrolaelaps oudemansiformis Hirschmann & Wisniewski, 1982
- Dendrolaelaps papuae Hirschmann & Wisniewski, 1982
- Dendrolaelaps paradoxa Shcherbak, 1982
- Dendrolaelaps passalorum (Pearse & Wharton, 1936)
- Dendrolaelaps peruensis Wisniewski & Hirschmann, 1989
- Dendrolaelaps piriformis Hirschmann & Wisniewski, 1982
- Dendrolaelaps populi Hirschmann, 1960
- Dendrolaelaps populoides Hirschmann & Wisniewski, 1982
- Dendrolaelaps posnaniensis Wisniewski & Hirschmann, 1984
- Dendrolaelaps praetarsalis Wisniewski & Hirschmann, 1985
- Dendrolaelaps presepum (Berlese, 1918)
- Dendrolaelaps procornutoides Hirschmann & Wisniewski, 1982
- Dendrolaelaps procornutus Hirschmann, 1960
- Dendrolaelaps proprius Shcherbak, 1985
- Dendrolaelaps proteae (Ryke, 1962)
- Dendrolaelaps punctatosimilis Hirschmann, 1960
- Dendrolaelaps punctatulus Hirschmann, 1960
- Dendrolaelaps punctatus (Hirschmann, 1954)
- Dendrolaelaps puntperivi (Schweizer, 1961)
- Dendrolaelaps quadricrinus (Berlese, 1920)
- Dendrolaelaps quadripilus (Berlese, 1920)
- Dendrolaelaps quadritorus (Robillard, 1971)
- Dendrolaelaps rackae Hirschmann & Wisniewski, 1982
- Dendrolaelaps rasmii Nasr & Mersal, 1986
- Dendrolaelaps rectus Karg, 1962
- Dendrolaelaps remotus Karg, 1977
- Dendrolaelaps reticulatus (Berlese, 1920)
- Dendrolaelaps reticulosus Hirschmann, 1960
- Dendrolaelaps rotoni (Hurlbutt, 1967)
- Dendrolaelaps rotundus Hirschmann, 1960
- Dendrolaelaps ruhmi Hirschmann, 1972
- Dendrolaelaps rykei Hirschmann, 1974
- Dendrolaelaps samsinaki Hirschmann & Wisniewski, 1982
- Dendrolaelaps saprophilus Huhta, 1982
- Dendrolaelaps schauenburgi (Schweizer, 1961)
- Dendrolaelaps schweizeri Hirschmann, 1960
- Dendrolaelaps sellnicki Hirschmann, 1960
- Dendrolaelaps sellnickiformis Hirschmann & Wisniewski, 1982
- Dendrolaelaps septentrionalis (Sellnick, 1958)
- Dendrolaelaps serratus Hirschmann, 1960
- Dendrolaelaps shcherbakaecornutus Hirschmann & Wisniewski, 1982
- Dendrolaelaps shennongjiaensis Ma & Liu, 2003
- Dendrolaelaps sibiriae Wisniewski & Michalski, 1983
- Dendrolaelaps simplicis Wisniewski & Hirschmann, 1991
- Dendrolaelaps sinodendronis Wisniewski & Hirschmann, 1989
- Dendrolaelaps sitalaensis (Bhattacharyya, 1978)
- Dendrolaelaps songshanensis Ma & Lin, 2005
- Dendrolaelaps stammeri Hirschmann, 1960
- Dendrolaelaps stammeriformis Hirschmann & Wisniewski, 1982
- Dendrolaelaps stanislavi Wisniewski & Hirschmann, 1993
- Dendrolaelaps strenzkei Hirschmann, 1960
- Dendrolaelaps tauricus Shcherbak, 1983
- Dendrolaelaps tenuipiloides Hirschmann & Wisniewski, 1982
- Dendrolaelaps tenuipilus Hirschmann, 1960
- Dendrolaelaps transkeiensis Hirschmann & Wisniewski, 1984
- Dendrolaelaps transportabilis Wisniewski & Hirschmann, 1993
- Dendrolaelaps transvaalensis (Ryke, 1962)
- Dendrolaelaps trapezoides Hirschmann, 1960
- Dendrolaelaps tritrichus Hirschmann, 1960
- Dendrolaelaps tuberosus Hirschmann, 1960
- Dendrolaelaps tumulus Luxton, 1982
- Dendrolaelaps uncinatus Hirschmann, 1960
- Dendrolaelaps undulatus Hirschmann, 1960
- Dendrolaelaps validulus (Berlese, 1920)
- Dendrolaelaps varipunctatus (Hurlbutt, 1967)
- Dendrolaelaps vermicularis Ma, 2001
- Dendrolaelaps viator (Vitzthum, 1921)
- Dendrolaelaps vitzthumicornutus Hirschmann & Wisniewski, 1982
- Dendrolaelaps wangfengzheni Ma, 1995
- Dendrolaelaps wengrisae Wisniewski, 1979
- Dendrolaelaps willmanni Hirschmann, 1960
- Dendrolaelaps xylophilus Wisniewski & Hirschmann, 1993
- Dendrolaelaps zaheri Metwally & Mersal, 1985
- Dendrolaelaps zwoelferi Hirschmann, 1960
