= Digamasellidae =

Digamasellidae Temporal range: Palaeogene–present

Scientific classification
- Kingdom: Animalia
- Phylum: Arthropoda
- Subphylum: Chelicerata
- Class: Arachnida
- Order: Mesostigmata
- Superfamily: Rhodacaroidea
- Family: Digamasellidae; Evans, 1957

Family of mites

Digamasellidae is a family of mites in the order Mesostigmata.

== Genera ==
These 11 genera belong to the family Digamasellidae:

- Dendrolaelaps Halbert, 1915
- Dendrolaelaspis Lindquist, 1975
- Dendroseius Karg, 1965
- Digamasellus Berlese, 1905
- Insectolaelaps Shcherbak, 1980
- Longoseius Chant, 1961
- Multidendrolaelaps Hirschmann, 1974
- Oligodentatus Shcherbak, 1980
- Orientolaelaps Bregetova & Shcherbak, 1977
- Panteniphis Willmann, 1949
- Pontiolaelaps Luxton, 1989

=== Uncertain placement ===
These species are considered incertae sedis within Digamasellidae:

- Asca muricata Fox, 1947
- Cyrtolaelaps armatus Berlese, 1904
- Dendrolaelaps ulmi Hirschmann, 1960
- Digamasellus arcuatus Willmann, 1939
- Digamasellus gradatus Willmann, 1938
- Gamasellus inermis Halbert, 1920
- Gamasellus claviger Lombardini, 1941
- Gamasellus cultriger Lombardini, 1940
- Gamasellus gracilis Berlese, 1920
- Gamasellus innumerus Berlese, 1920
- Gamasellus rhodacaroides Berlese, 1920
- Gamasellus simplex Berlese, 1920
- Panteniphis rhombus Ma & Lin, 2007
