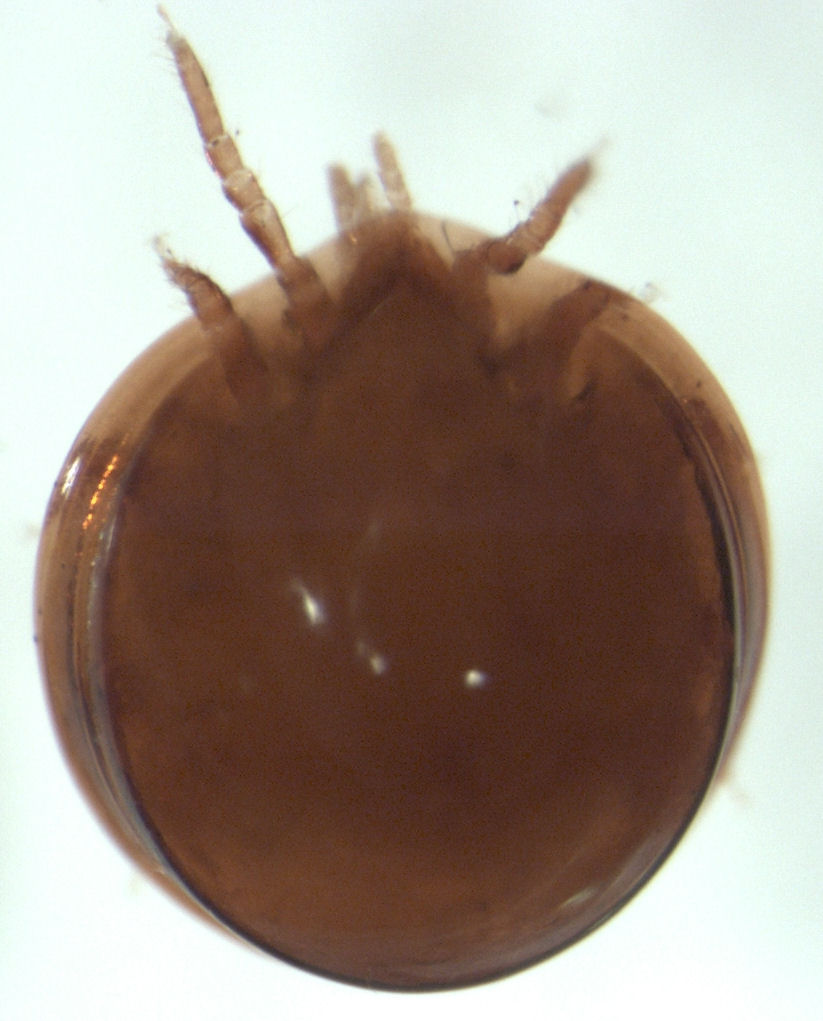
- Oplitis pusaterii

Scientific classification
- Kingdom: Animalia
- Phylum: Arthropoda
- Subphylum: Chelicerata
- Class: Arachnida
- Order: Mesostigmata
- Suborder: Monogynaspida
- Infraorder: Uropodina
- Superfamily: Uropodoidea
- Family: Oplitidae; Johnston, 1968

= Oplitidae =

Family of mites

Oplitidae is a family of mites in the order Mesostigmata.

== Species ==
- Cariboplitis Sellnick, 1963
  - Cariboplitis almerodai (Hiramatsu & Hirschmann, 1991)
  - Cariboplitis daressalami (Wisniewski, 1980)
  - Cariboplitis ellipsoides (Hirschmann, 1991)
  - Cariboplitis evansi (Hirschmann, 1983)
  - Cariboplitis naetaensis (Marais & Loots, 1981)
  - Cariboplitis pecki (Hirschmann, 1991)
  - Cariboplitis pecksimilis (Hirschmann, 1991)
  - Cariboplitis testigosensis Sellnick, 1963
  - Cariboplitis tonopilus (J. F. Marais & G. C. Loots, 1981)
  - Cariboplitis trínidadis (Hirschmann, 1991)
- Latotutulioplitis W. Hirschmann, 1984
  - Latotutulioplitis labyrinthi (Hirschmann, 1984)
  - Latotutulioplitis latotutuli (Hirschmann, 1984)
  - Latotutulioplitis ootutuli (Hirschmann, 1984)
  - Latotutulioplitis radiata (Hirschmann, 1984)
  - Latotutulioplitis tutuli (Hirschmann, 1984)
  - Latotutulioplitis zavattarii (Valle, 1955)
  - Latotutulioplitis zicsii (Zirngiebl-Nicol & Hirschmann, 1973)
- Marginura Sellnick, 1926
  - Marginura adhaerens Sellnick, 1926
  - Marginura apicata (Banks, 1916)
  - Marginura attaae (Hirschmann, 1972)
  - Marginura fraterna (Banks, 1916)
  - Marginura granulata (Hunter & Farrier, 1976)
  - Marginura guineae (Hirschmann, 1991)
  - Marginura internata (Banks, 1916)
  - Marginura interrupta (Berlese, 1916)
  - Marginura litoralis (Hunter & Farrier, 1976)
- Oplitis Berlese, 1884
  - Oplitis akkeshiensis Hiramatsu, 1981
  - Oplitis aktia Hunter & Farrier, 1976
  - Oplitis alienorum Hunter & Farrier, 1976
  - Oplitis alophora (Berlese, 1903)
  - Oplitis alta (Sellnick, 1973)
  - Oplitis altasimilis (Hirschmann, 1977)
  - Oplitis angustifolia Hirschmann, 1984
  - Oplitis anisa Hunter & Farrier, 1976
  - Oplitis aokii Hiramatsu, 1979
  - Oplitis arboricavi Hunter & Farrier, 1976
  - Oplitis athiasae Zirngiebl-Nicol & Hirschmann, 1973
  - Oplitis baloghi (Zirngiebl-Nicol & Hirschmann, 1977)
  - Oplitis baloghisimilis Zirngiebl-Nicol & Hirschmann, 1973
  - Oplitis barbata Hiramatsu, 1978
  - Oplitis beccarii (Berlese, 1904)
  - Oplitis belizensis Hirschmann, 1991
  - Oplitis berleseiphiloctena Hirschmann, 1991
  - Oplitis bispinosa (Wisniewski & Hirschmann, 1991)
  - Oplitis bispirata (Selnick, 1954)
  - Oplitis blufftonensis Hunter & Farrier, 1976
  - Oplitis boliviensis Hirschmann, 1991
  - Oplitis brasiliensis (Sellnick, 1926)
  - Oplitis calceolata (Berlese, 1916)
  - Oplitis camponoti Hirschmann, 1991
  - Oplitis carteretensis Hunter & Farrier, 1976
  - Oplitis castrii Zirngiebl-Nicol & Hirschmann, 1973
  - Oplitis castriisimilis Zirngiebl-Nicol & Hirschmann, 1973
  - Oplitis catemacoensis (Hirschmann, 1977)
  - Oplitis cheleuta Hunter & Farrier, 1976
  - Oplitis circularis Hiramatsu, 1978
  - Oplitis communis Hunter & Farrier, 1976
  - Oplitis comparata (Banks, 1916)
  - Oplitis concinna Hiramatsu, 1983
  - Oplitis conspicua (Berlese, 1903)
  - Oplitis cornelli Hirschmann, 1991
  - Oplitis cristobalensis Hirschmann, 1991
  - Oplitis cubana Wisniewski & Hirschmann, in Hirschmann 1991
  - Oplitis dakotensis McDaniel & Bolen, 1980
  - Oplitis delicia Fox, 1957
  - Oplitis dictyoeides Zirngiebl-Nicol & Hirschmann, 1973
  - Oplitis dimidiata Hirschmann, 1991
  - Oplitis dimidiatasimilis Hirschmann & Wisniewski, in Hirschmann 1991
  - Oplitis disparata (Banks, 1916)
  - Oplitis domsthorpii (Hüll, 1921)
  - Oplitis endrodyi Zirngiebl-Nicol & Hirschmann, 1973
  - Oplitis euchroeana Wisniewski & Hirschmann, in Hirschmann 1991
  - Oplitis exigua (Fox, 1949)
  - Oplitis exopodi Hunter & Farrier, 1976
  - Oplitis exsectoidesorum Hunter & Farrier, 1976
  - Oplitis farrieri Gorirossi Bourdeau, 1993
  - Oplitis floreanae Hirschmann, 1991
  - Oplitis fofanai Hirschmann, 1991
  - Oplitis franzi Hirschmann & Zirngiebl-Nicol, 1969
  - Oplitis garibaldii Hunter & Farrier, 1976
  - Oplitis ghanaovalis Zirngiebl-Nicoi, & Hirschmann, 1973
  - Oplitis gyotokui Hiramatsu, 1979
  - Oplitis haradai Hiramatsu, 1983
  - Oplitis hiramatsui Wisniewski, 1979
  - Oplitis hirschmanni (Hiramatsu, 1979)
  - Oplitis indicus Wisniewski & Hirschmann, 1995
  - Oplitis inexplicata (Wisniewski & Hirschmann, 1991)
  - Oplitis infumata (Berlese, 1916)
  - Oplitis inopina (Hull, 1923)
  - Oplitis irae Hirschmann, 1984
  - Oplitis itoi Hiramatsu, 1979
  - Oplitis jakubi (Bloszyk & Athias-Binche, 1986)
  - Oplitis japanominutissima Hiramatsu, 1979
  - Oplitis jilinensis Ma, 2001
  - Oplitis kaszabi (Zirngiebl-Nicol & Hirschmann, 1973)
  - Oplitis kaszabisimilis Zirngiebl-Nicol & Hirschmann, 1973
  - Oplitis krasinskayae Hirschmann, 1984
  - Oplitis laevis Wisniewski & Hirschmann, 1995
  - Oplitis lalapi Hiramatsu & Hirschmann, in Hirschmann 1991
  - Oplitis lapidaria Hirschmann, 1991
  - Oplitis lasiocornelli Hirschmann, 1991
  - Oplitis lasiorum Hirschmann, 1991
  - Oplitis latifolia Hirschmann, 1984
  - Oplitis latisaetigera Masan, 1999
  - Oplitis leonardiana (Berlese, 1903)
  - Oplitis lindquisti (Hirschmann, 1977)
  - Oplitis loksai (Zirngiebl-Nicol & Hirschmann, 1977)
  - Oplitis luzonensis Hiramatsu & Hirschmann, in Hirschmann 1991
  - Oplitis macclellam Hunter & Farrier, 1976
  - Oplitis maeandralis Zirngiebl-Nicol & Hirschmann, 1973
  - Oplitis magna (Zirngiebl-Nicol & Hirschmann, 1977)
  - Oplitis mahunkai Zirngiebl-Nicol & Hirschmann, 1973
  - Oplitis mahunkaisimilis Zirngiebl-Nicol & Hirschmann, 1973
  - Oplitis margaritaensis Hirschmann, 1979
  - Oplitis marginalis Hirschmann, 1991
  - Oplitis mayae Hirschmann, 1991
  - Oplitis mexicana (Hirschmann, 1977)
  - Oplitis minutissima (Berlese, 1903)
  - Oplitis mirabilis (Hirschmann, 1973)
  - Oplitis mollis Hiramatsu, 1983
  - Oplitis moseri Hirschmann, 1972
  - Oplitis mystacina (Trägårdh, 1952)
  - Oplitis nagasakiensis Hiramatsu, 1976
  - Oplitis natalensis (Marais & Loots, 1981)
  - Oplitis neptuni (Schuster, 1958)
  - Oplitis nicolae Hirschmann, 1991
  - Oplitis nitida (Womersley, 1959)
  - Oplitis nontransversaria Zirngiebl-Nicol & Hirschmann, 1973
  - Oplitis oblita Hirschmann, 1991
  - Oplitis ogasawaraensis Hiramatsu, 1979
  - Oplitis onishii Hiramatsu, 1980
  - Oplitis ovatula (Berlese, 1903)
  - Oplitis pangasuganensis Hiramatsu & Hirschmann, in Hirschmann 1991
  - Oplitis paradoxa (G.Canestrini & Berlese, 1884)
  - Oplitis paraguayensis Hirschmann, 1991
  - Oplitis pecinai Hirschmann, 1984
  - Oplitis penicillata (Zirngiebl-Nicol & Hirschmann, 1977)
  - Oplitis pennsylvanica (Berlese, 1903)
  - Oplitis perigenitalis Hirschmann, 1991
  - Oplitis philoctena (Trouessart, 1902)
  - Oplitis piedmontensis Hunter & Farrier, 1976
  - Oplitis potchefstroomensis (Ryke, 1958)
  - Oplitis punctata Masan, 1999
  - Oplitis pusilia (Berlese, 1888)
  - Oplitis rarosi Hiramatsu & Hirschmann, 1991
  - Oplitis reticulata Zirngiebl-Nicol & Hirschmann, 1973
  - Oplitis retrobarbatulus (Berlese, 1916)
  - Oplitis ricasoliana (Berlese, 1889)
  - Oplitis rotunda (Zirngiebl-Nicol & Hirschmann, 1977)
  - Oplitis sabulosa Hiramatsu, 1979
  - Oplitis salebrosa Masan, 1999
  - Oplitis salinasi Hiramatsu & Hirschmann, in Hirschmann 1991
  - Oplitis sarcinulus Hunter & Farrier, 1976
  - Oplitis schatzi Hirschmann, 1991
  - Oplitis schmitzi (Kneissl, 1908)
  - Oplitis schusteri (Hirschmann & Zirngiebl-Nicol, 1972)
  - Oplitis serrata (Zirngiebl-Nicol & Hirschmann, 1977)
  - Oplitis shibai (Hiramatsu, 1980)
  - Oplitis signata (Hüll, 1918)
  - Oplitis silvahirschmanni Hiramatsu, 1979
  - Oplitis similibispirata Zirngiebl-Nicol & Hirschmann, 1973
  - Oplitis similiminutissima Hiramatsu, 1979
  - Oplitis solmani Wisniewski & Hirschmann, in Hirschmann 1991
  - Oplitis southplazae Hirschmann, 1991
  - Oplitis stammeri Hirschmann & Zirngiebl-Nicol, 1961
  - Oplitis structura (Hirschmann, 1991)
  - Oplitis subcorticalis Hirschmann & Wisniewski, in Hirschmann 1991
  - Oplitis szunyeghyi Hirschmann, 1983
  - Oplitis termitophila Ztrngiebl-Nicol & Hirschmann, 1973
  - Oplitis trachymyrmecon Hunter & Farrier, 1976
  - Oplitis trispinosa (Wisniewski & Hirschmann, 1991)
  - Oplitis uncinata Zirngiebl-Nicol & Hirschmann, 1973
  - Oplitis uvsnuurensis Wisnewski & Hirschmann, in Hirschmann 1991
  - Oplitis villosella (Berlese, 1903)
  - Oplitis vinalica (Wisniewski & Hirschmann, 1991)
  - Oplitis virgilinus Hunter & Farrier, 1976
  - Oplitis wasmanni (Kneissl, 1907)
  - Oplitis woelkei Hirschmann, 1975
  - Oplitis yuxini Ma, 2001
- Wisniewskiioplitis W. Hirschmann, 1984
  - Wisniewskiioplitis hirschmanni (Wisniewski, 1979)
  - Wisniewskiioplitis wisniewskii (Hirschmann, 1984)
