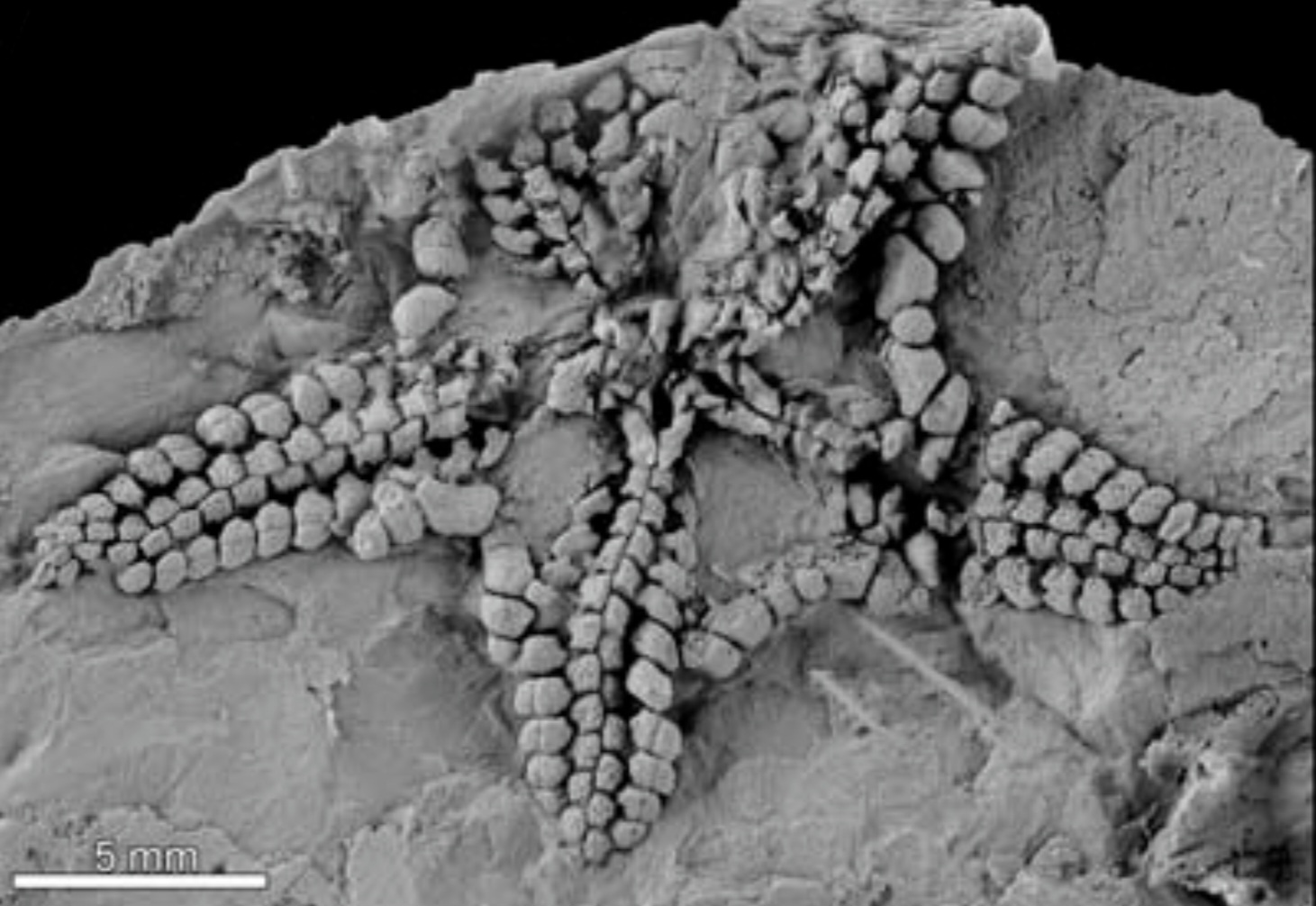
- Holotype specimen of O. elegans

Scientific classification
- Kingdom: Animalia
- Phylum: Echinodermata
- Class: Ophiuroidea
- Order: †Oegophiurida
- Family: †Encrinasteridae
- Subfamily: †Encrinasterinae
- Genus: †Ophiocantabria; Blake, Zamora & García-Alcalde, 2015
- Species: †O. elegans

Binomial name
- †Ophiocantabria elegans Blake, Zamora & García-Alcalde, 2015

= Ophiocantabria =

Ophiocantabria Temporal range: Lochkovian

Extinct genus of brittle stars

Ophiocantabria is an extinct genus of brittle stars that lived during the early Devonian period in what is now the Furada Formation of Spain. It contains a single species, O. elegans, which was first described in 2015 from a complete specimen.

== Discovery and naming ==
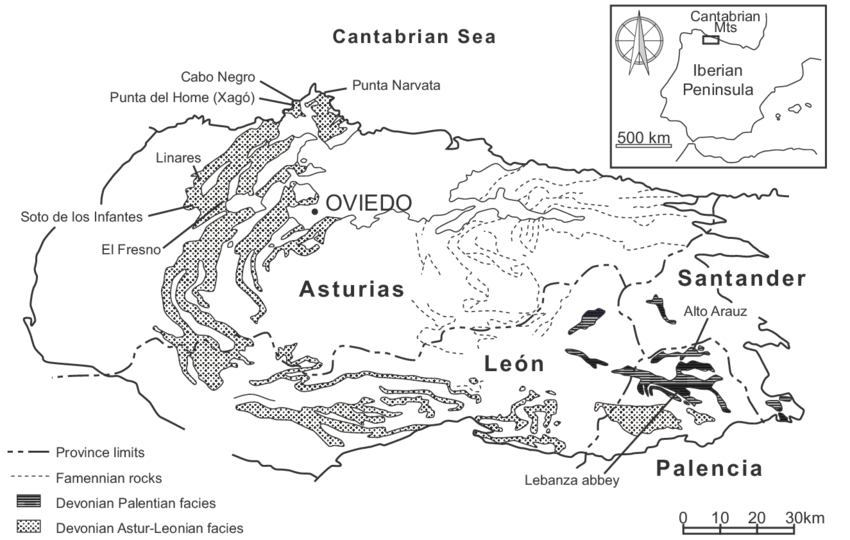
Geological map of the Cantabrian Mountains, with El Fresno (the village where the type specimen of Ophiocantabria was found) labeled

The only known specimen of Ophiocantabria was collected in the village of El Fresno, located in the Cantabrian Mountains of northern Spain. The deposits from which the fossil originates represents a poorly-exposed section of the Furada Formation covered partly by vegetation, which dates to the early Lochkovian stage of the Devonian period. In 2015, paleontologists Daniel Blake, Samuel Zamora and Jenaro Garcia-Alcalde described a new genus and species based on this specimen, which they named Ophiocantabria elegans. The generic name references the Cantabrian Mountains where the fossil was discovered, while the specific name is Latin for "elegant". The only known specimen of this species has been designated as the holotype, and is housed in the geology museum of the University of Oviedo where it is cataloged as DPO 33484.
