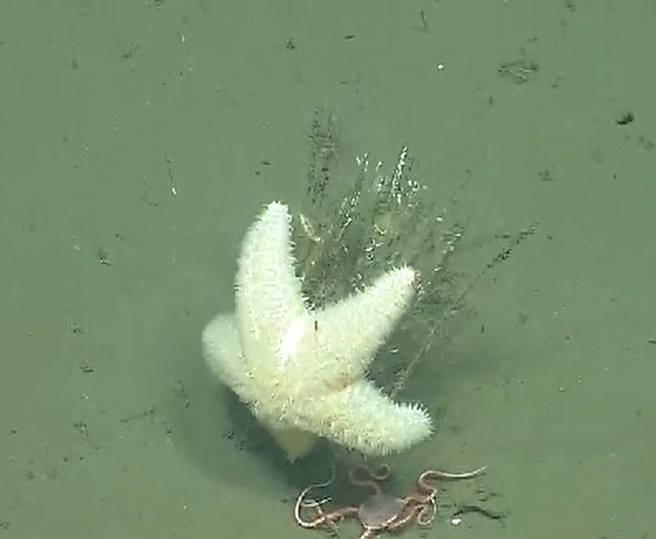
- Poraniopsis inflata

Scientific classification
- Kingdom: Animalia
- Phylum: Echinodermata
- Class: Asteroidea
- Order: Valvatida
- Family: Poraniidae
- Genus: Poraniopsis
- Species: P. inflata

Binomial name
- Poraniopsis inflata (Fisher, 1906)

Synonyms
- Alexandraster inflatus Fisher, 1906

= Poraniopsis inflata =

Species of starfish

Poraniopsis inflata, the spiny sea star, is a species of starfish in the family Poraniidae. It is native to the Pacific Ocean and is found in deep water off the coast of North America.

== Description ==
Poraniopsis inflata has a somewhat inflated body and five short arms and grows to a diameter of about 16 centimetres (6.3 in). The aboral surface bears a moderate number of short conical spines with white tips. The skin colour is typically orange but can be brownish-white or white marked with violet.

== Biology ==
Poraniopsis inflata feeds on sponges.

== Distribution ==
Poraniopsis inflata is native to the western coast of North America. Its range extends from southeastern Alaska to San Diego, California. It is an uncommon species and is found on rocky substrates in deep water in the Monterey region.
