= Zeugophiurina =

Scientific classification
- Kingdom: Animalia
- Phylum: Echinodermata
- Class: Ophiuroidea
- Order: †Oegophiurida
- Suborder: †Zeugophiurina; Matsumoto, 1929

Families
- †Furcasteridae; †Klasmuridae; †Lapworthuridae

Suborder of brittle stars

Zeugophiurina is a suborder of primitive brittle stars with three extinct families.
