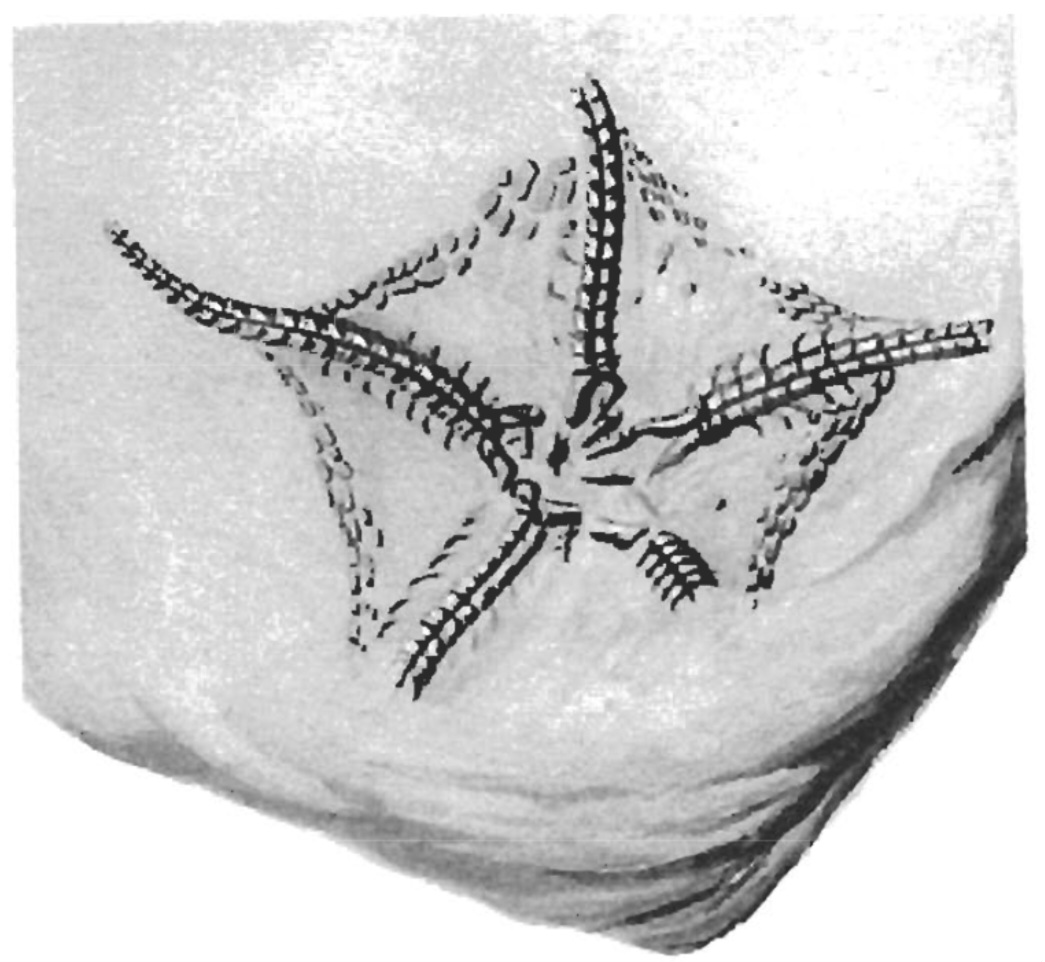
- Illustration of the holotype specimen of M. yachalensis

Scientific classification
- Kingdom: Animalia
- Phylum: Echinodermata
- Class: Ophiuroidea
- Order: †Oegophiurida
- Family: †Encrinasteridae
- Subfamily: †Encrinasterinae
- Genus: †Marginix; Martínez & del Río, 2015

Type species
- †Encrinaster yachalensis (= †Marginix yachalensis) Ruedemann, 1916

Other species
- †M. hilleri Jell & Theron, 1999; †M. notatus Fraga & Vega, 2020

Synonyms
- Synonyms of Marginix: Marginaster Haude, 1995 (preoccupied); Marginura Haude, 1999 (preoccupied); Synonyms of M. yachalensis: Encrinaster yachalensis Ruedemann, 1916; Marginaster yachalensis Haude, 1995; Marginura yachalensis Haude, 1999; Synonyms of M. hilleri: Marginura hilleri Jell & Theron, 1999

= Marginix =

Marginix Temporal range: Early Devonian–Late Devonian

Extinct genus of brittle stars

Marginix is an extinct genus of brittle star in the family Encrinasteridae that lived during the Devonian period in South America and Africa. It contains three named species. The type species, M. yachalensis, was originally named as a species of Encrinaster in 1916, and its remains are known from Argentina. A second species, M. hilleri, was first described in 1999 based on specimens from South Africa, and a third species, M. notatus, originates from Brazil and was named in 2020. Fossils of Marginix were first recognized to represent a distinct genus in 1995, but the genus was only given its current name in 2015. Prior to this, it was given the names Marginaster and Marginura, but both were preoccupied and had to be replaced.

== Discovery and naming ==
In 1916, a study by Rudolf Ruedemann describing some fossil material sent from Cerro Blanco, Jachal, Argentina to John Mason Clarke at the New York State Museum was published. The fossils, then thought to represent starfish remains, were recognized by Ruedemann to represent two new species, one of which he thought was a member of the genus Encrinaster and named Encrinaster yachalensis, the specific name referring to Jachal. Ruedemann studied a single specimen of this species, exhibiting the abactinal side of the animal, cataloged as NYSM 7762 and designated as the holotype of the species. Later in 1995, Reimund Haude discovered that this species, now known to be a brittle star, differs significantly from other species of Encrinaster, and thus transferred it to a new genus which he named Marginaster. The species was thus renamed as Marginaster yachalensis, and became the type species of its genus. Haude would later be made aware that the name Marginaster was preoccupied by a starfish in the Poraniidae family named by Edmond Perrier in 1881, and therefore renamed the genus to Marginura in 1999. However, this name was also preoccupied, as it had already been given by Max Sellnick to a mite in 1926. Realizing this, Sergio Martínez and Claudia del Río renamed the genus again to Marginix in 2015.

=== Species ===
The following species are currently assigned to the genus Marginix:

- M. yachalensis is the type species of the genus, originally named as Encrinaster yachalensis in 1916. Fossils of this species are known from the area surrounding Jachal in San Juan Province, Argentina. Though initially claimed to be from Silurian-aged deposits, it is now known to be from the Early Devonian-aged Talacasto Formation instead.
- M. hilleri was originally named as Marginura hilleri by Peter A. Jell and Johannes N. Theron in 1999. The specific name honors Norton Hiller, who contributed the material for study. The remains of this species were collected from deposits of the Bokkeveld Group in Swaarmoed Pass, South Africa.
- M. notatus was described in 2020 based on several specimens originating from outcrops of the São Domingos Member of the Ponta Grossa Formation in Paraná, Brazil, dating to the Late Devonian period. An external mould of an adult specimen on a siltstone block, cataloged as UFPR 0588 PI, was designated as the type specimen. The specific name is a Latin word meaning "marked", in reference to the animal's well-marked disk.
