= Red cushion star =

Red cushion star may refer to:

- Oreaster reticulatus, a sea star in the family Oreasteridae, found in the western Atlantic Ocean and the Caribbean Sea
- Porania pulvillus, a sea star in the family Poraniidae, found in western and northern Europe and the northwest Atlantic
