= Marginura =

Scientific classification
- Domain: Eukaryota
- Kingdom: Animalia
- Phylum: Arthropoda
- Subphylum: Chelicerata
- Class: Arachnida
- Order: Mesostigmata
- Family: Oplitidae
- Genus: Marginura; Sellnick, 1926

Type species
- Marginura adhaerens Sellnick, 1926

Genus of mites

Marginura is a genus of mites in the family Oplitidae. It was named by Max Sellnick in 1926, and the type species is M. adhaerens. In 1999, a fossil brittle star was given the same generic name, but because this name was preoccupied by the mite, the brittle star was renamed as Marginix in 2015.
