= Cephalouropoda =

Scientific classification
- Kingdom: Animalia
- Phylum: Arthropoda
- Subphylum: Chelicerata
- Class: Arachnida
- Order: Mesostigmata
- Family: Trachyuropodidae
- Genus: Cephalouropoda; Berlese, 1903

Genus of mites

Cephalouropoda is a genus of mites in the family Trachyuropodidae.
