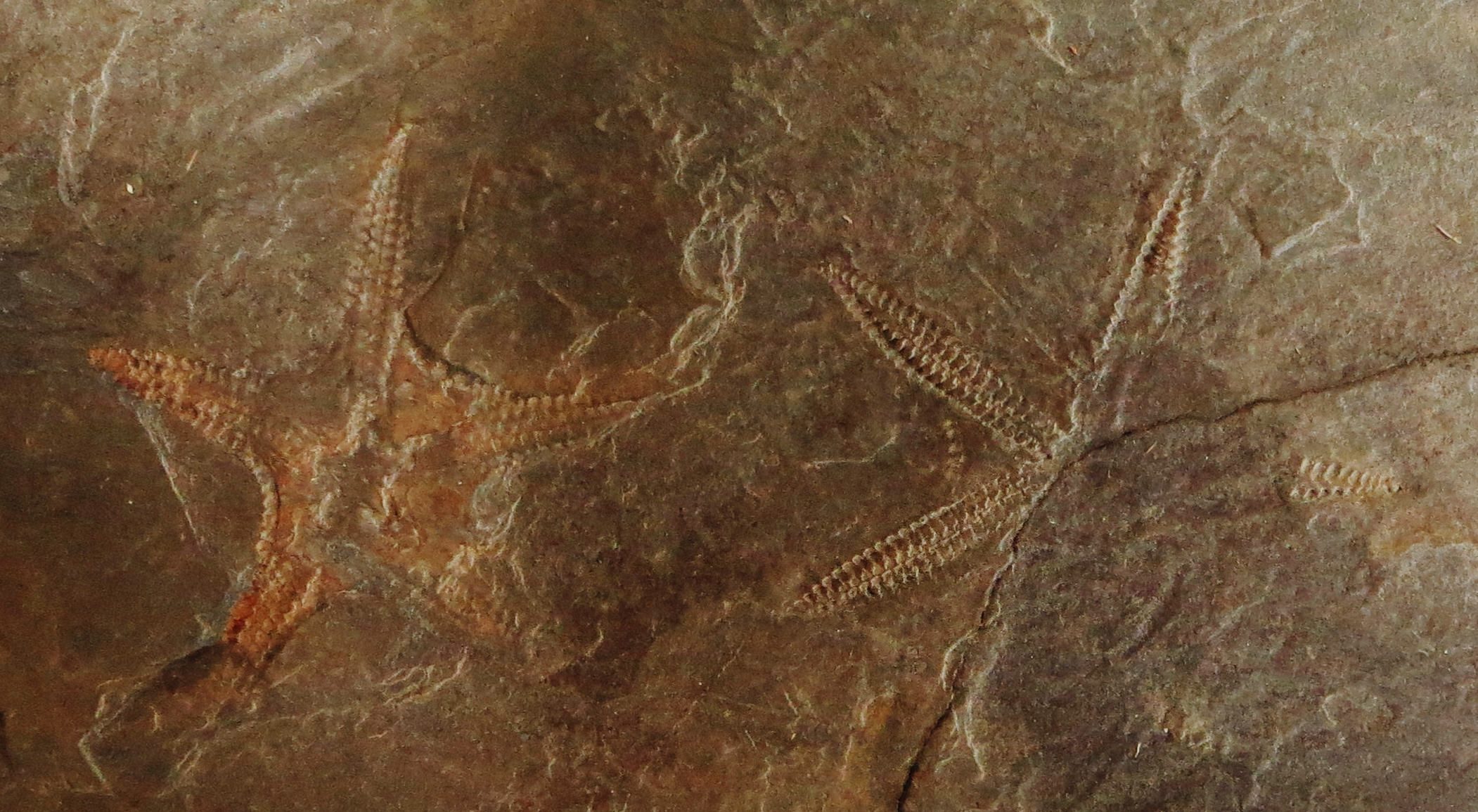
- Fossils of Encrinaster arnoldi

Scientific classification
- Kingdom: Animalia
- Phylum: Echinodermata
- Class: Ophiuroidea
- Order: †Oegophiurida
- Family: †Encrinasteridae; Schuchert, 1914

Subgroups
- †Armathyrasterinae; †Armathyraster; †Encrinasterinae; †Crepidosoma; †Encrinaster; †Euzonosoma; †Haughtonaster; †Krommaster; †Marginix; †Ophiocantabria; †Urosoma

= Encrinasteridae =

Encrinasteridae Temporal range: Late Ordovician–Late Carboniferous

Extinct family of brittle stars

Encrinasteridae is an extinct family of brittle stars. It was erected in 1914 by Charles Schuchert, and the type genus is Encrinaster.

== Classification ==
The family Encrinasteridae was originally named by Charles Schuchert in 1914 as a monotypic group containing only the genus Encrinaster. Later authors assigned more genera to the family, and two subfamilies, Encrinasterinae and Armathyrasterinae, were proposed based primarily on the arrangement of the adambulacrals (ossicles lying along the ambulacral grooves) in 1978.
