= Phymatodiscus =

Scientific classification
- Kingdom: Animalia
- Phylum: Arthropoda
- Subphylum: Chelicerata
- Class: Arachnida
- Order: Mesostigmata
- Family: Trachyuropodidae
- Genus: Phymatodiscus; Berlese, 1918

Genus of mites

Phymatodiscus is a genus of mites in the family Trachyuropodidae.

== Species ==
- Phymatodiscus aokii Hiramatsu, 1985
- Phymatodiscus coniferus (Canestrini, 1897)
- Phymatodiscus haradai Hiramatsu, 1985
- Phymatodiscus ignesemovens Hirschmann, 1977
- Phymatodiscus iriomotensis Hiramatsu, 1979
- Phymatodiscus mirabilis Hirschmann, 1977
- Phymatodiscus mirandus (Berlese, 1905)
- Phymatodiscus oculatus Hirschmann, 1977
- Phymatodiscus polyglottis Hirschmann, 1977
- Phymatodiscus titanicus (Berlese, 1905)
