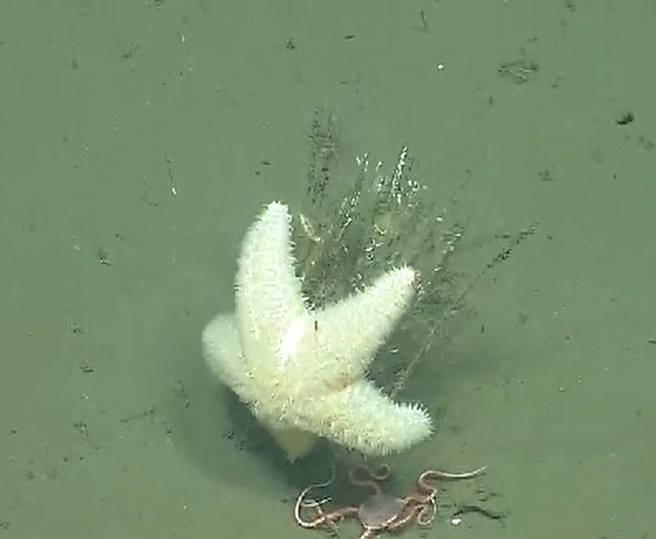
- Poraniopsis inflata

Scientific classification
- Kingdom: Animalia
- Phylum: Echinodermata
- Class: Asteroidea
- Order: Valvatida
- Family: Poraniidae
- Genus: Poraniopsis; Perrier, 1891

Species
- see text

Synonyms
- Alexandraster Ludwig, 1905; Lahillea de Loriol, 1904; Ortmannia de Loriol, 1906

= Poraniopsis =

Genus of starfishes

Poraniopsis is a genus of starfish in the family Poraniidae in the order Valvatida. Poraniopsis echinaster is the type species.

== Species ==
The following species are recognised:

- Poraniopsis echinaster Perrier, 1891
- Poraniopsis inflata (Fisher, 1906)
