= Urojanetia =

Scientific classification
- Domain: Eukaryota
- Kingdom: Animalia
- Phylum: Arthropoda
- Subphylum: Chelicerata
- Class: Arachnida
- Order: Mesostigmata
- Family: Trachyuropodidae
- Genus: Urojanetia; Berlese, 1918

Genus of mites

Urojanetia is a genus of mites in the family Trachyuropodidae.
