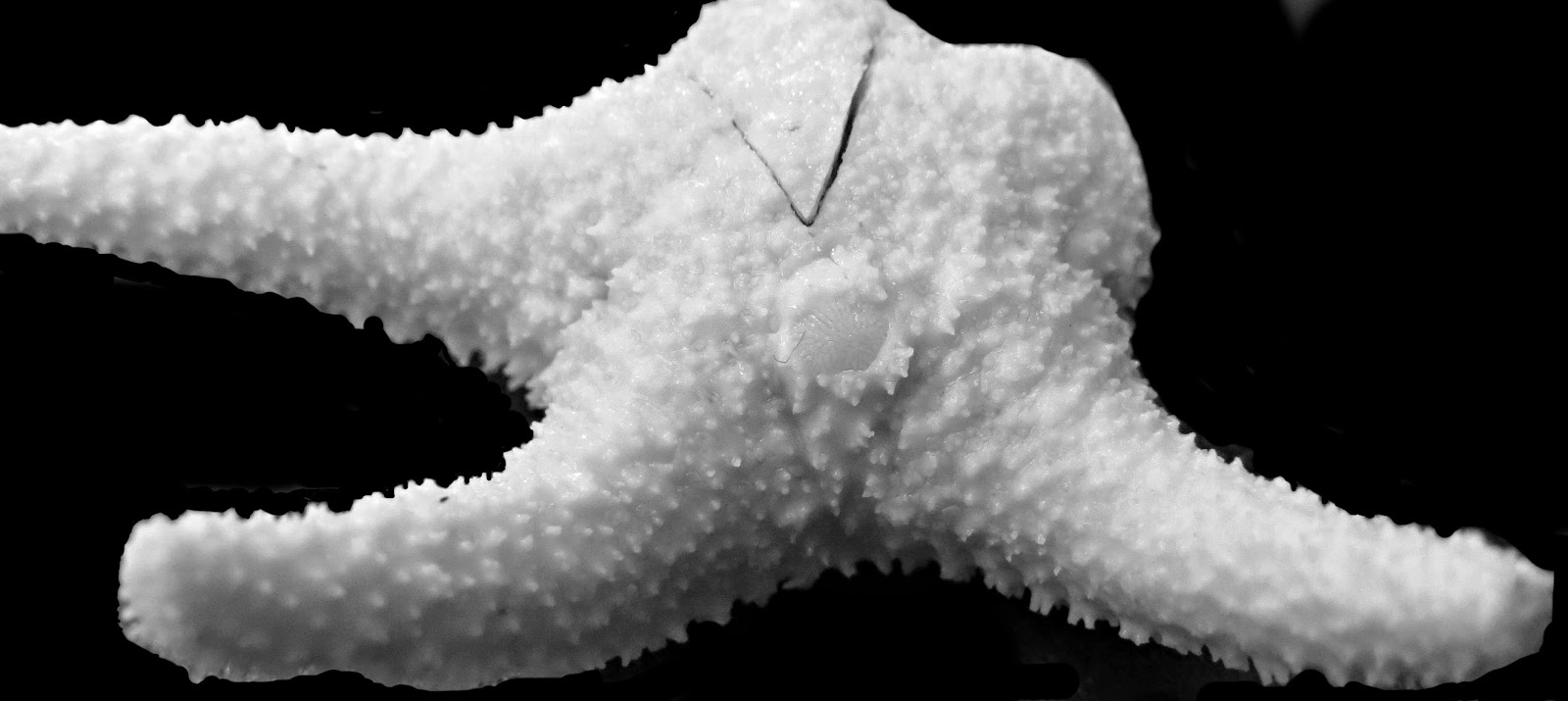

Scientific classification
- Kingdom: Animalia
- Phylum: Echinodermata
- Class: Asteroidea
- Order: Valvatida
- Family: Poraniidae
- Genus: Bathyporania; Mah & Foltz, 2014
- Species: B. ascendens

Binomial name
- Bathyporania ascendens Mah & Foltz, 2014

= Bathyporania =

Genus of starfishes

Bathyporania ascendens is a species of starfish in the family Poraniidae, and the only species of the genus Bathyporania. It is native to the Pacific Ocean and is found in deep water off the coast of North America (it was discovered at Davidson Seamount).

== Description ==
Bathyporania ascendens has a classical starfish shape with five short arms, a somewhat inflated body and is of pale color. The oral surface is covered with spinelets, and marked by 5 large ambulacral grooves with strong podia.

== Biology ==
The Poraniidae are supposed to be passive deposit-feeders, but as Bathyporania ascendens has been observed climbing on black coral, it may be a predator of deep-sea cnidarians.

== Distribution ==
Bathyporania ascendens has been found during a deep-sea survey by the Monterey Bay Aquarium Research Institute at Davidson Seamount, off the coast of the Monterey region, at 2669 meters deep. Even if this was the only recorded observation to date, this species may have a large distribution, as it is often the case with deep-sea species.
