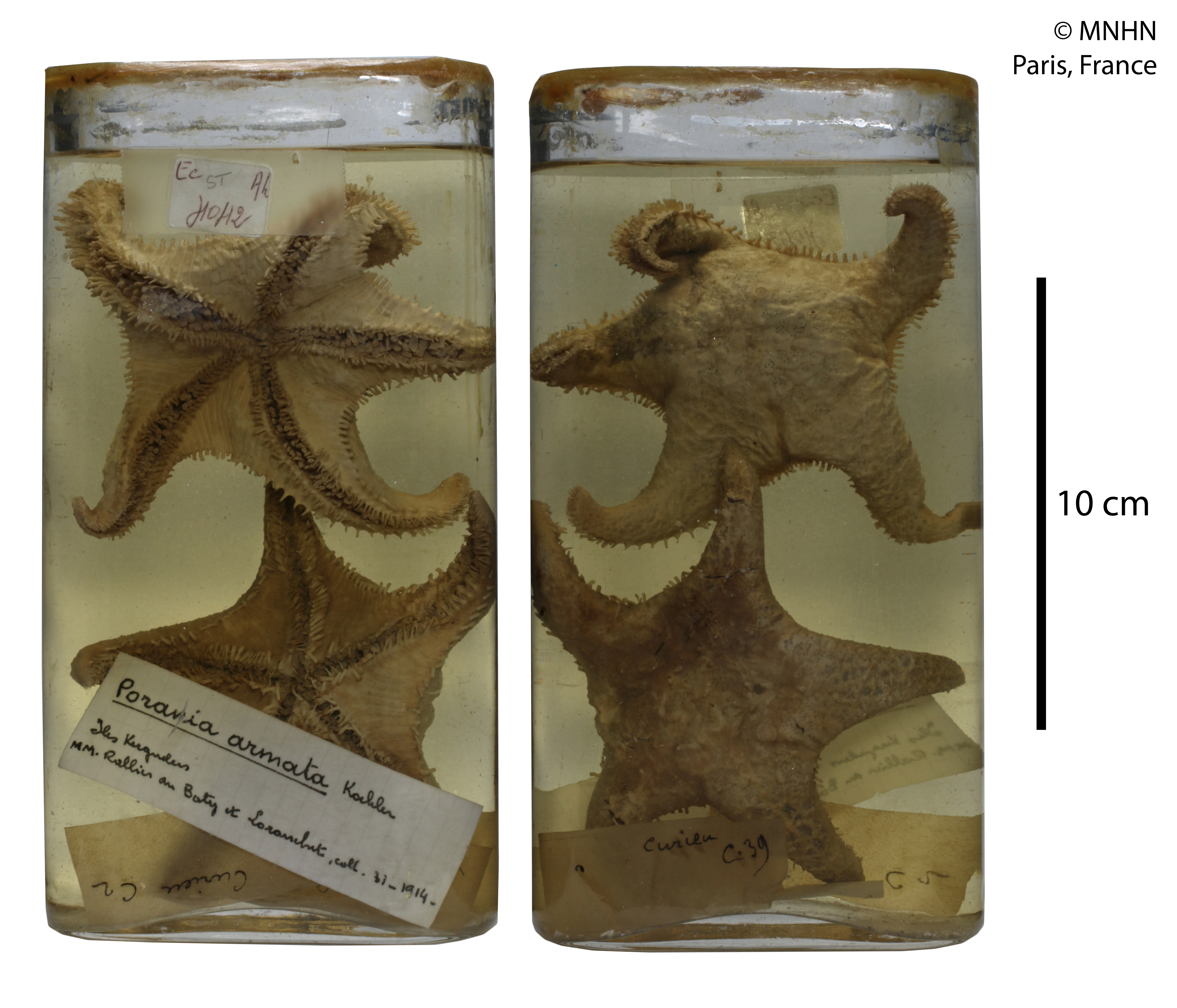

Scientific classification
- Kingdom: Animalia
- Phylum: Echinodermata
- Class: Asteroidea
- Order: Valvatida
- Family: Poraniidae
- Genus: Glabraster; A.H. Clark, 1916
- Species: G. antarctica

Binomial name
- Glabraster antarctica (E. A. Smith, 1876)

Synonyms
- Porania antarctica E. A. Smith, 1876; Astrogonium fonki Philippi, 1858; Porania armata Koehler, 1917; Porania glaber Sladen, 1889; Porania magellanica Studer, 1876

= Glabraster =

Genus of starfishes

Glabraster is a genus of starfish in the family Poraniidae. It is monotypic, the sole species being Glabraster antarctica. It is also known as the red spiny cushion star.

Glabraster antarctica is found in the Southern Ocean, southern Pacific Ocean, and southern Atlantic Ocean on rock, sand, and shell substrates from the intertidal zone down to a depth of 900 m (3,000 ft). Although morphologically variable, genetic analyses do not support splitting this species into subspecies.
