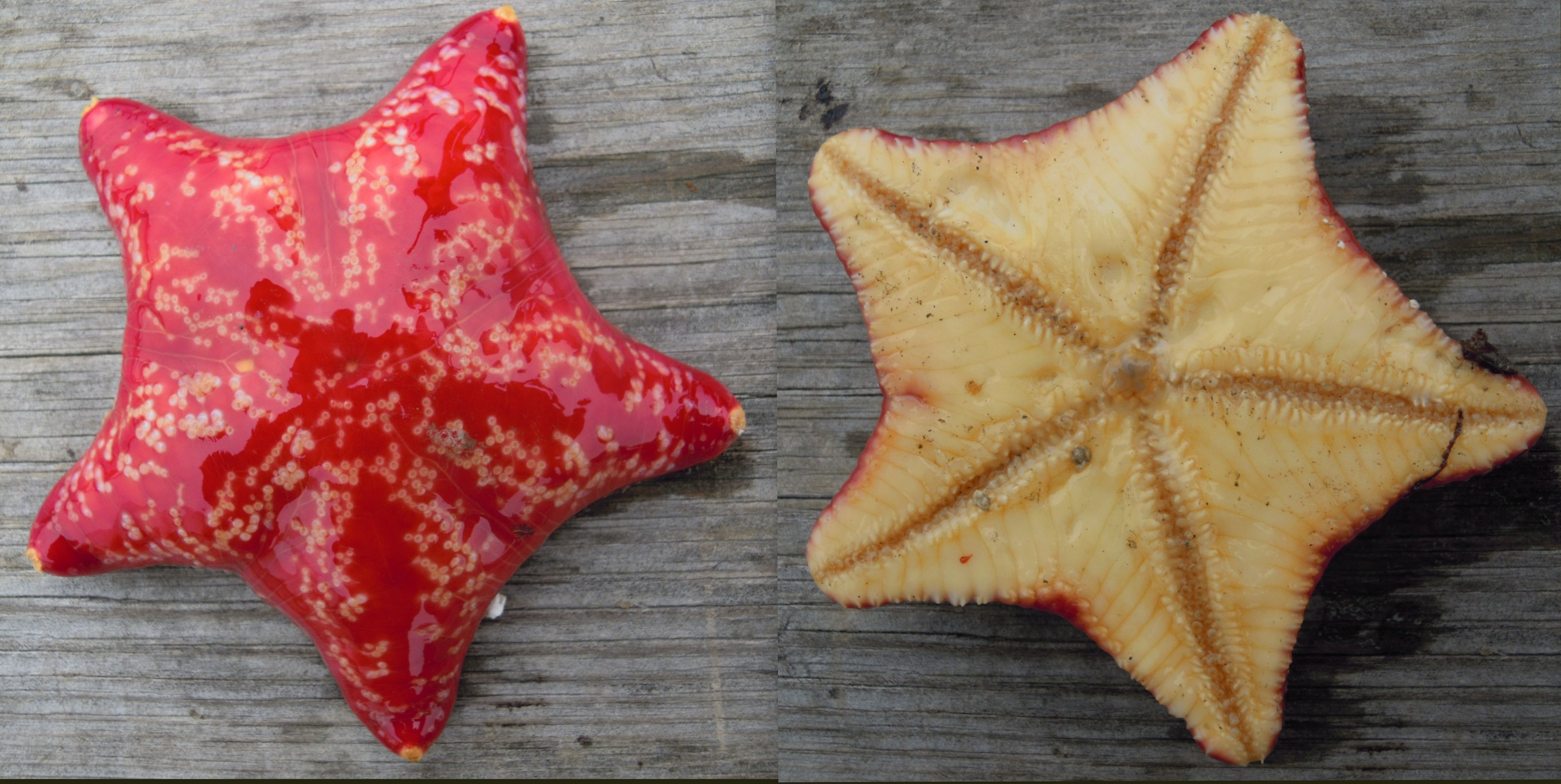
- Porania pulvillus aboral and oral surfaces

Scientific classification
- Kingdom: Animalia
- Phylum: Echinodermata
- Class: Asteroidea
- Order: Valvatida
- Family: Poraniidae
- Genus: Porania; Gray, 1840

Species
- 3 species (see text)

Synonyms
- Gymnasterias

= Porania =

Genus of starfishes

Porania is a genus of starfish in the family Poraniidae.

== Species ==
The following subgenera and species are recognised:

- Porania (Porania) Gray, 1840
  - Porania hermanni Madsen, 1959
  - Porania pulvillus (O.F. Müller, 1776)
- Porania (Pseudoporania) Dons, 1936
  - Porania stormi Dons, 1936
