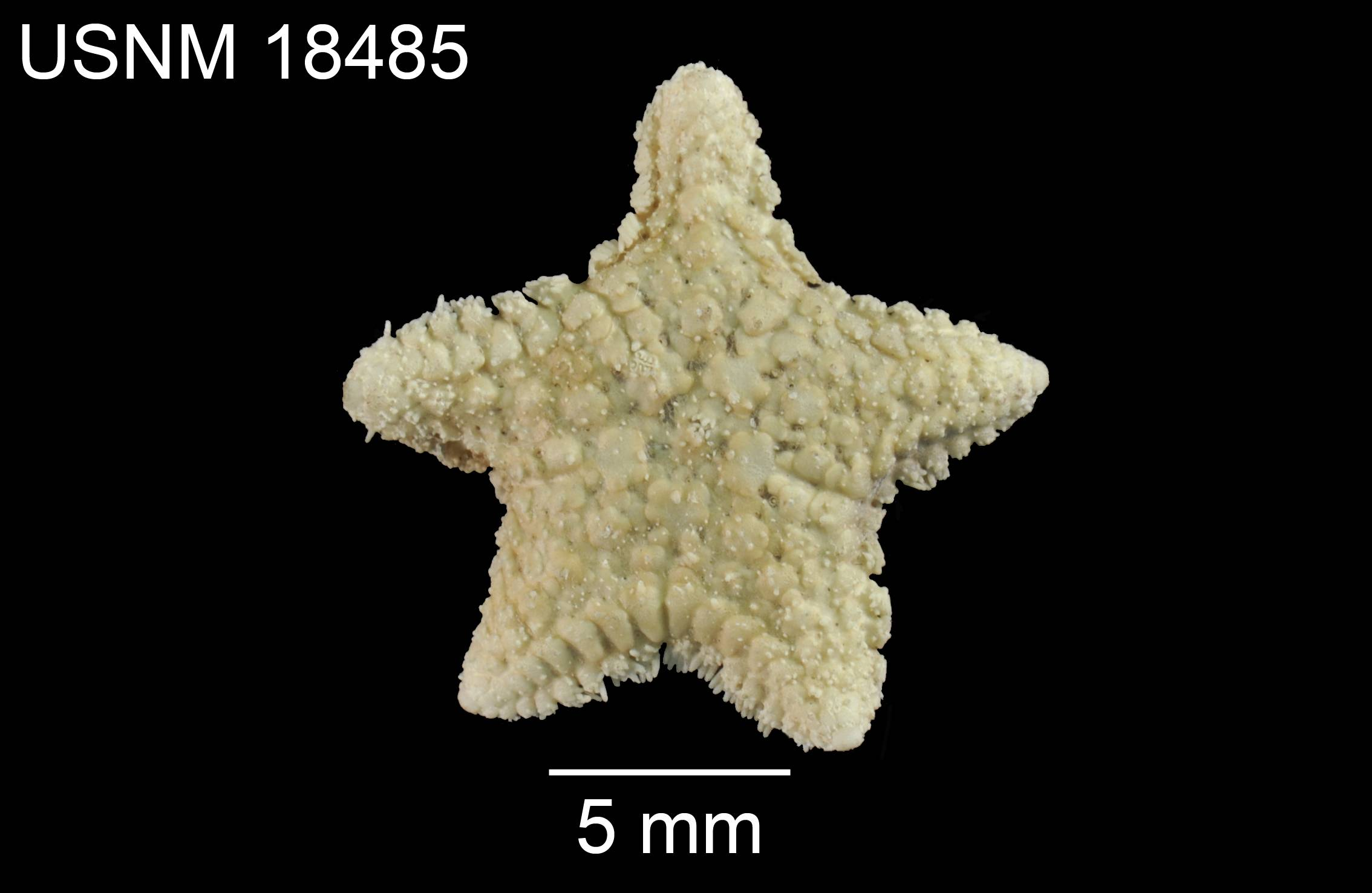
- Preserved specimen of Marginaster pectinatus

Scientific classification
- Kingdom: Animalia
- Phylum: Echinodermata
- Class: Asteroidea
- Order: Valvatida
- Family: Poraniidae
- Genus: Marginaster; Perrier, 1881

Type species
- Marginaster pectinatus Perrier, 1881

Species
- See text

Synonyms
- Poranisca Verrill, 1914

= Marginaster =

Genus of starfishes

Marginaster is a genus of starfish in the family Poraniidae within the order Valvatida. It was named in 1881 by Edmond Perrier, and the type species is M. pectinatus. In 1995, a fossil brittle star was given the same generic name; however, because the name was preoccupied by the starfish, the brittle star required renaming. The brittle star was renamed Marginix in 2015.

== Species ==
The following species are recognized:

- Marginaster capreensis
- Marginaster patriciae
- Marginaster paucispinus
- Marginaster pectinatus
