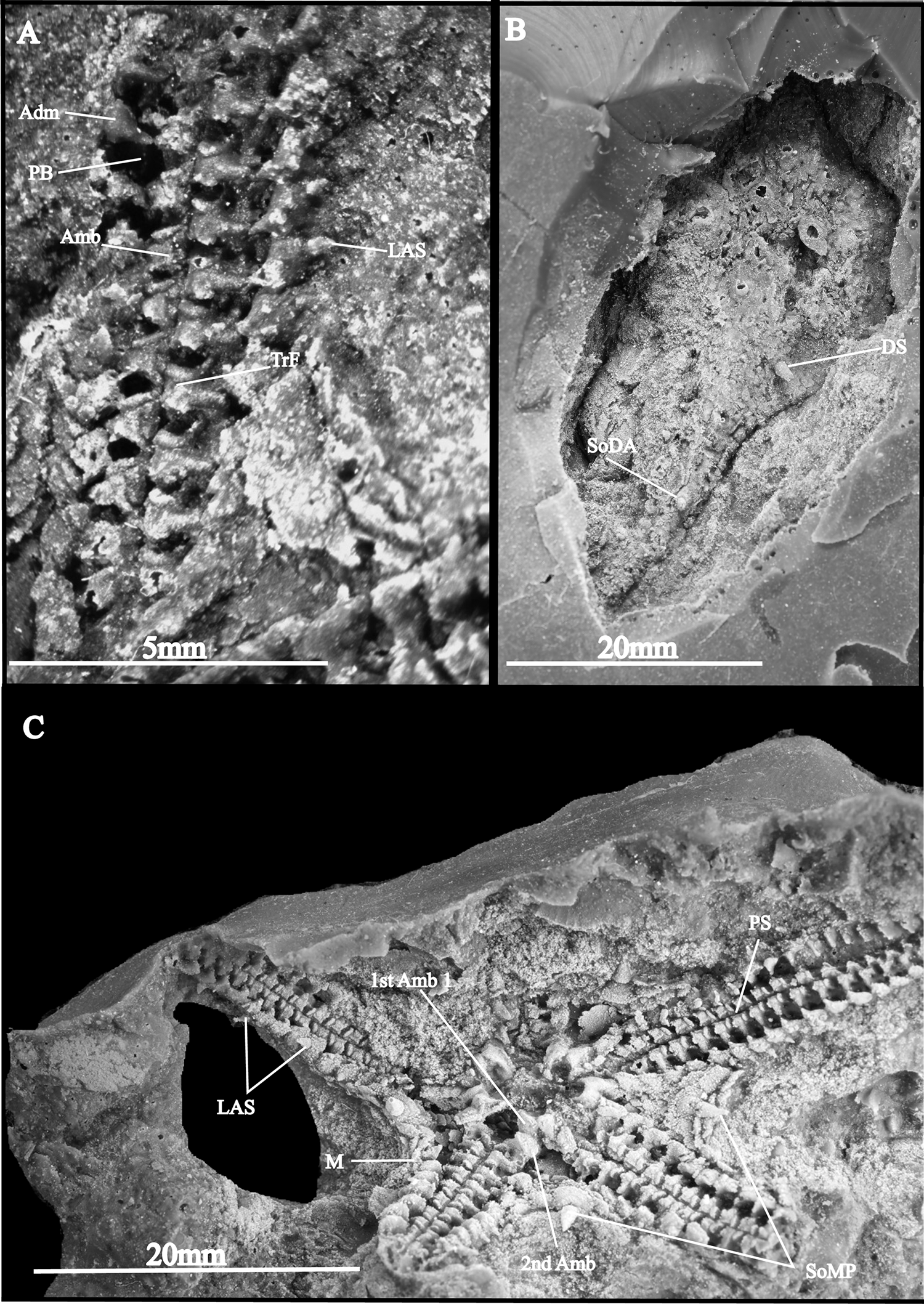
- Holotype specimen of K. spinosus

Scientific classification
- Kingdom: Animalia
- Phylum: Echinodermata
- Class: Ophiuroidea
- Order: †Oegophiurida
- Family: †Encrinasteridae
- Subfamily: †Encrinasterinae
- Genus: †Krommaster; Reddy, Thuy, Reid & Gess, 2023
- Species: †K. spinosus

Binomial name
- †Krommaster spinosus Reddy, Thuy, Reid & Gess, 2023

= Krommaster =

Krommaster Temporal range: Early Devonian

Extinct genus of echinoderms

Krommaster (meaning "Krom River star") is an extinct genus of early ophiuroids (brittle stars) that lived nearly 410 million years ago in the early Devonian period of South Africa. It was found in the upper unit of the Baviaanskloof formation, Cape super group, Table Mountain group, Eastern cape. This genus has one species which is Krommaster spinosus. This species was discovered alongside Hexuraster, another species of brittle star living in the same area.

== Discovery and naming ==
Fossilized material of brittle stars were discovered in South African deposits older than the Bokkeveld Group for the first time by paleontologist Robert Gess, who collected several specimens originating from the upper unit of the Baviaanskloof Formation in Eastern Cape. These specimens were described in a 2023 study which recognized most of them to represent a new genus and species, while one of them was a specimen of Hexuraster weitzi. The new taxon was given the name Krommaster spinosus, the generic name combining "Kromm" (in reference to the Krom River, in the canyon of which the fossils were found) with the Latin word "aster" (meaning "star"), while the specific name is Latin for "spiny" (in reference to the animal's large spines). A fully articulated specimen and its counterpart (AM18222A+B) were designated as the holotype of this species, and two other specimens were listed as paratypes. These are all kept in the Albany Museum, along with two additional known specimens.

== Description ==
This genus is characterized by their moderately large encrinasterid with a disk covered in a mosaic of small, thin scales and extending form the fifth and sixth arm segments. They also have conical pointed spines with similar but smaller spines on the dorsal disk and along the dorsal mid line of the arms.
