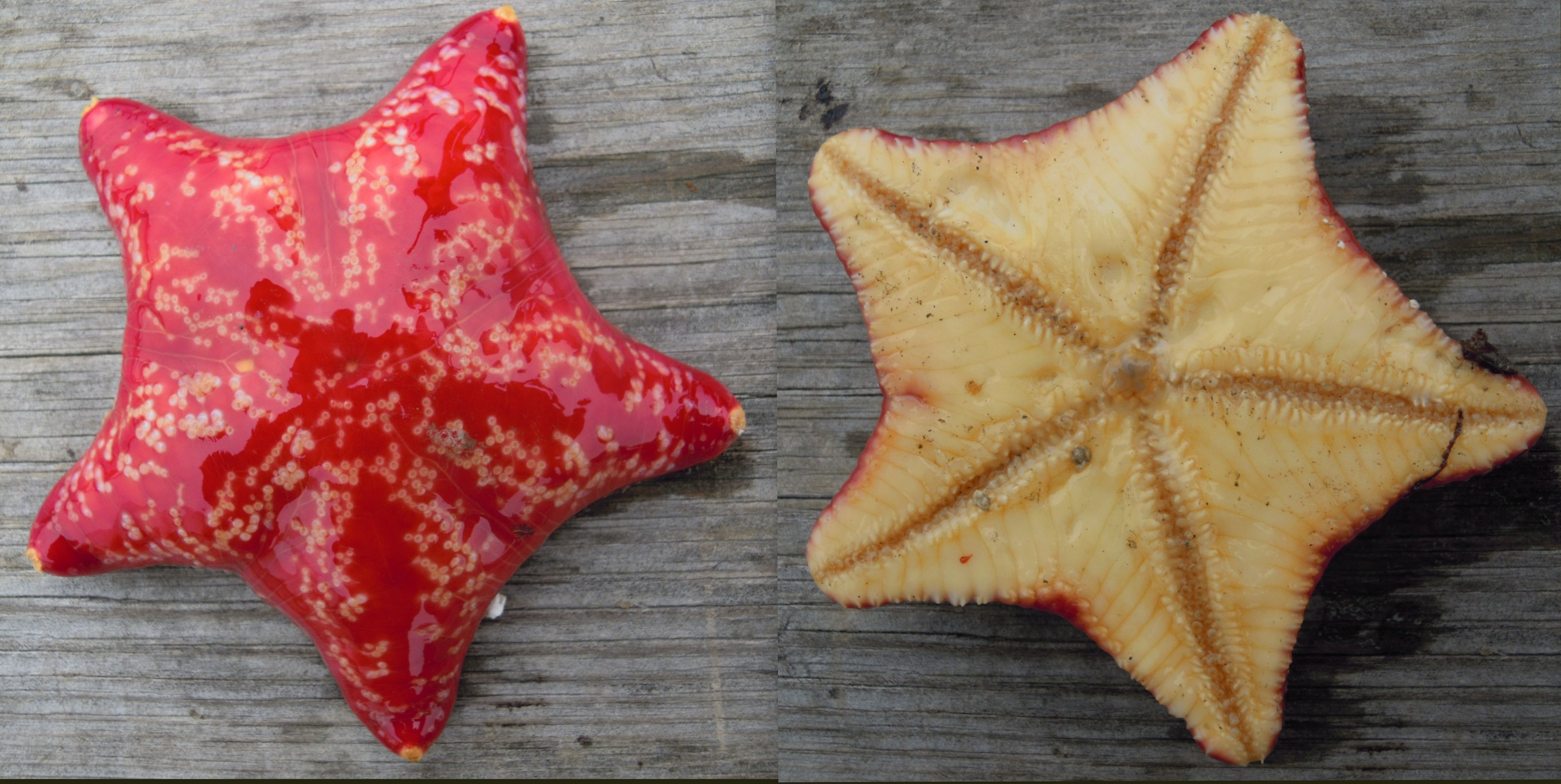
- Aboral and oral surfaces of P. pulvillus

Conservation status
- Not evaluated (IUCN 3.1)

Scientific classification
- Kingdom: Animalia
- Phylum: Echinodermata
- Class: Asteroidea
- Order: Valvatida
- Family: Poraniidae
- Genus: Porania
- Species: P. pulvillus

Binomial name
- Porania pulvillus O.F. Müller, 1776

Synonyms
- Asterias pulvillus O.F. Müller, 1776; Asteropsis pulvillus (O.F. Müller, 1776); Porania gibbosa Leach in Gray, 1840

= Porania pulvillus =

Species of sea star

Porania pulvillus, also called the red cushion star or red cushion starfish, is a species of sea star in the family Poraniidae. The specific name pulvillus means "little cushion."

== Description ==
Porania pulvillus is up to 12 cm (4.7 in) in diameter. The aboral surface (top) is usually bright red but may be purple, orange or yellow. It has white/yellowish spots and bands that radiate from the centre, and smooth greasy skin. The madreporite is in the centre. P. pulvillus has translucent soft papillae that act as gills. The oral surface (underside) is pale. This sea star has five short, broad arms. Each arm has two rows of small ossicles on either side. It has no pedicellariae.

== Subspecies ==
There are two subspecies:

- Porania (Porania) pulvillus pulvillus (O.F. Müller, 1776)
- Porania (Porania) pulvillus insignis Verrill, 1895

== Distribution ==
It is widely distributed in the northern Atlantic Ocean, including the waters off Great Britain, Ireland, Iceland, Norway, New England and Newfoundland.

== Environment ==
Porania pulvillus is sublittoral, typically living at 10–300 m (33–984 ft) depth, but some at up to 1,000 m (3,300 ft).

== Behaviour ==
Porania pulvillus produces brachiolaria larvae in spring. It is gonochoristic.

It feeds on detritus and the soft coral Alcyonium digitatum.

== Gallery ==
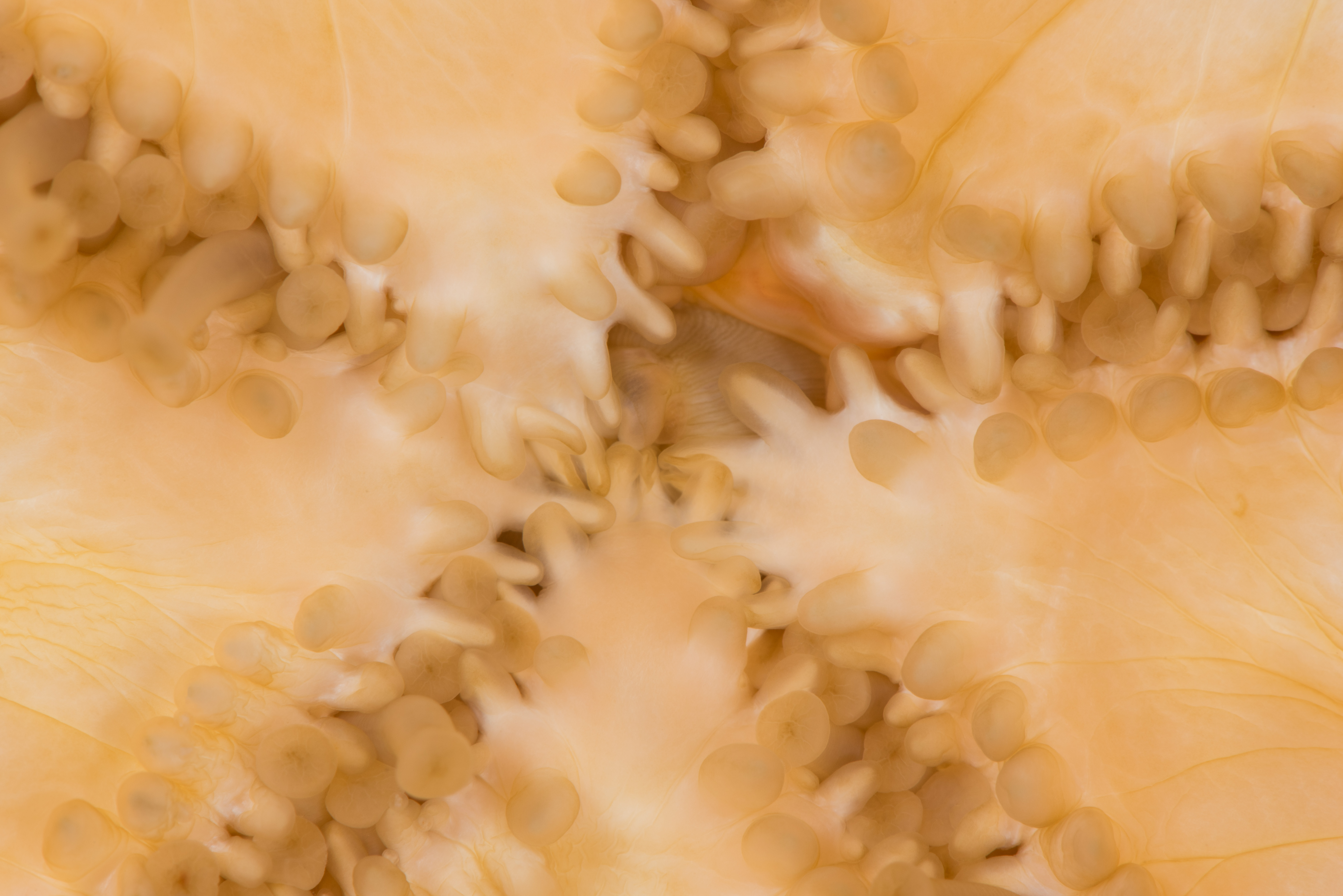
View of pores on oral surface

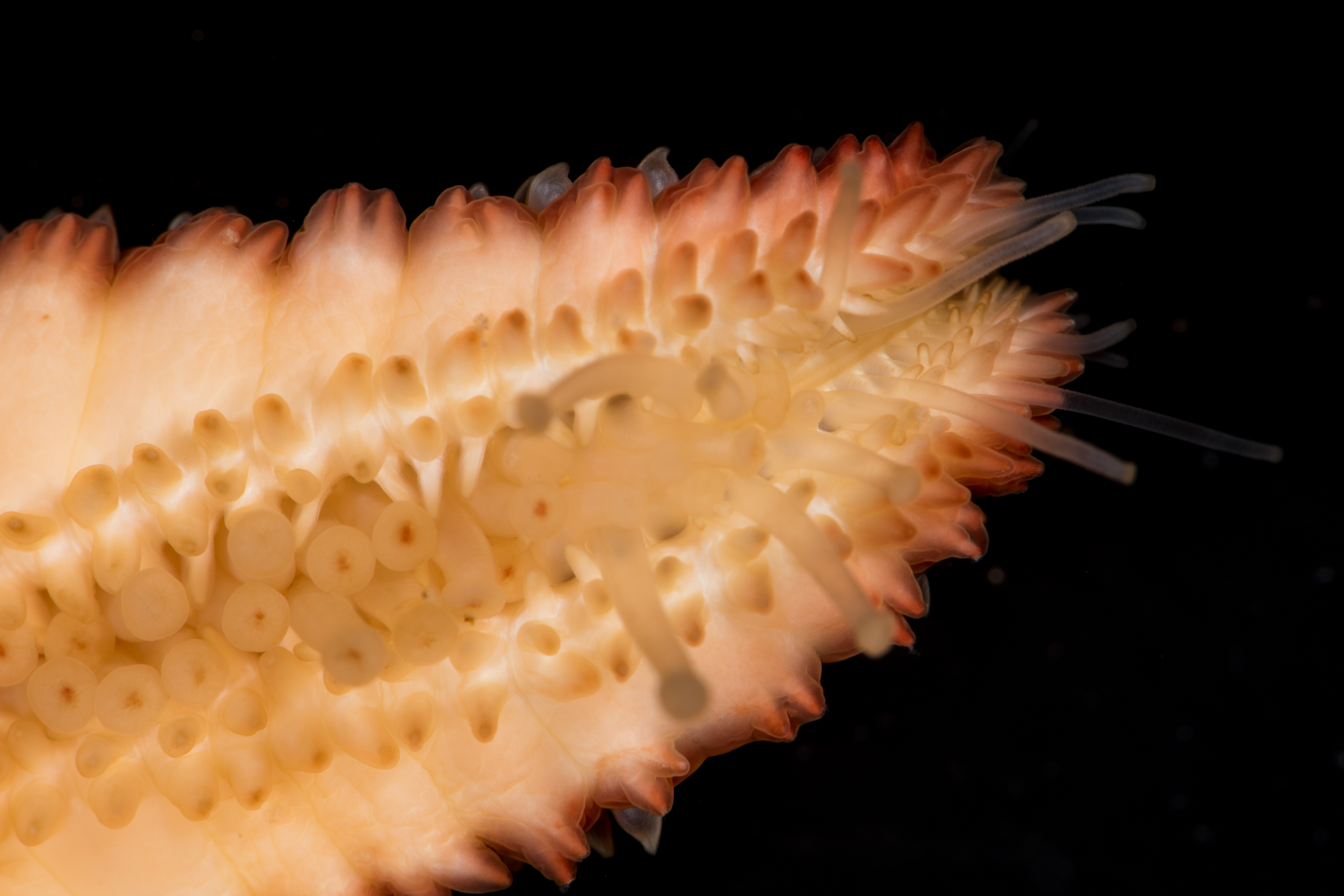
Oral surface of the end of a leg

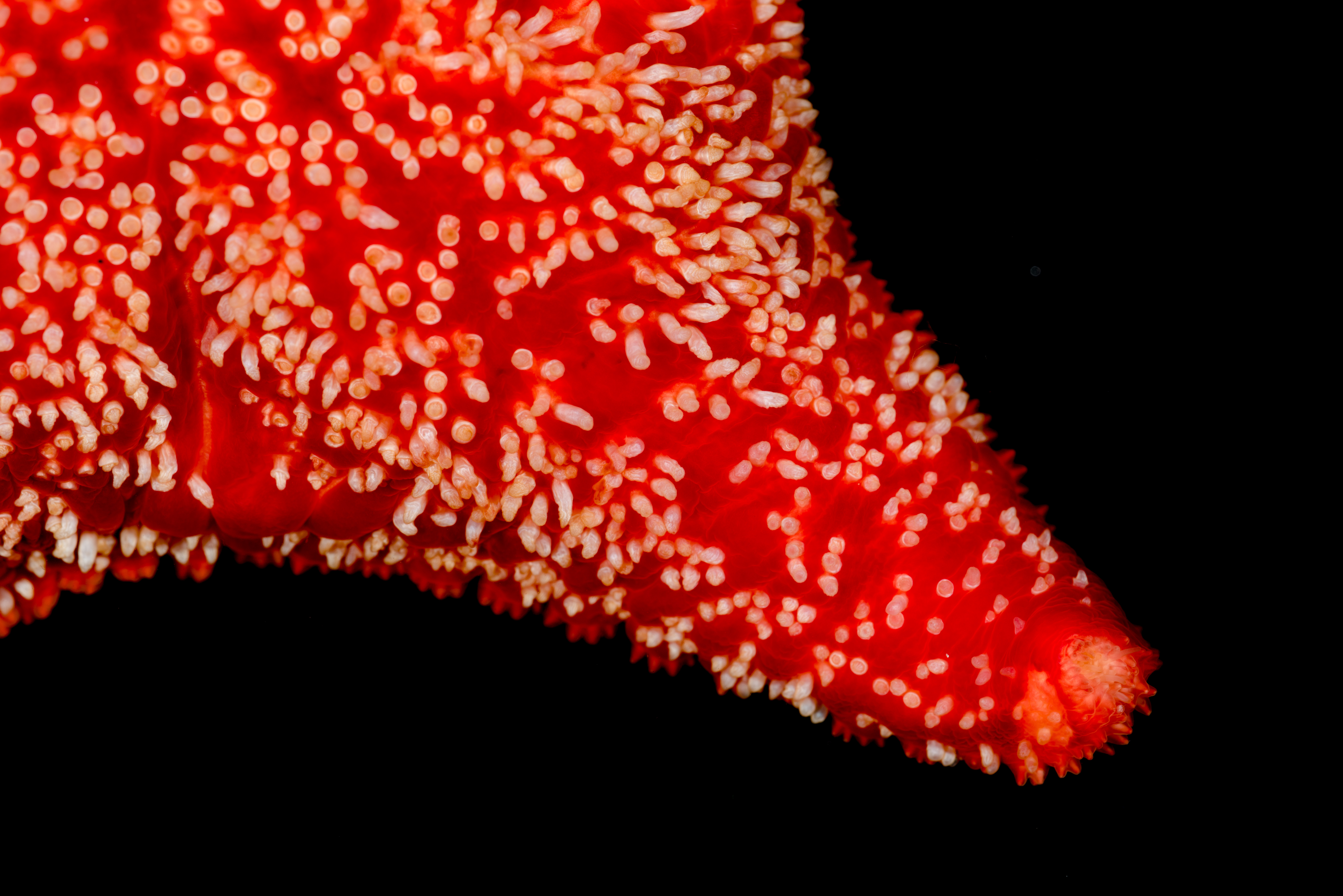
Aboral surface of the end of a leg

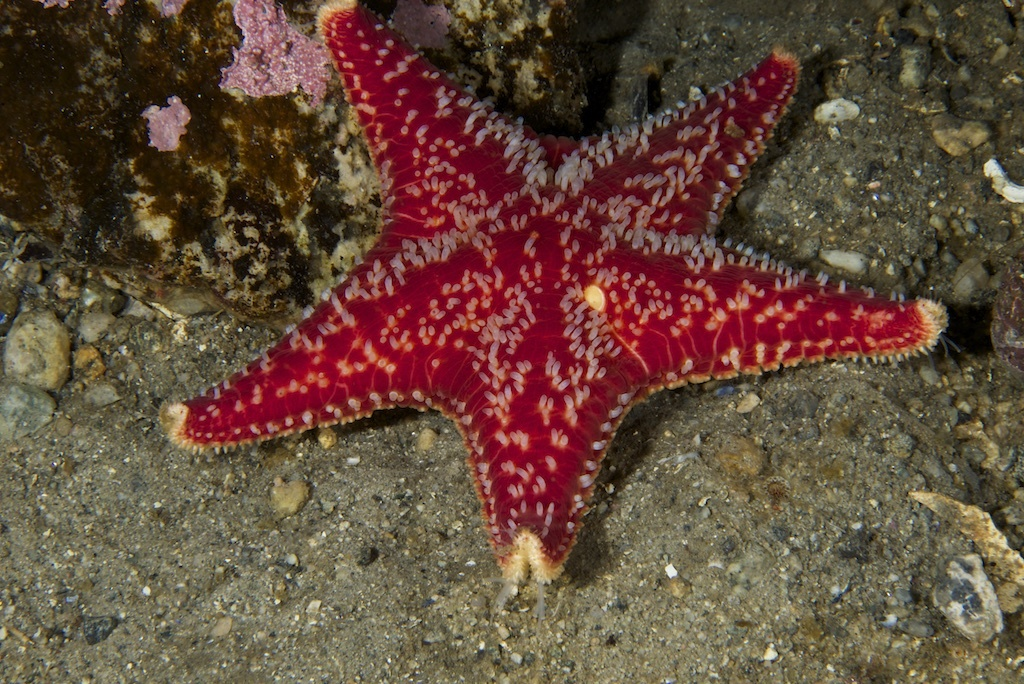
A red Porania pulvillus

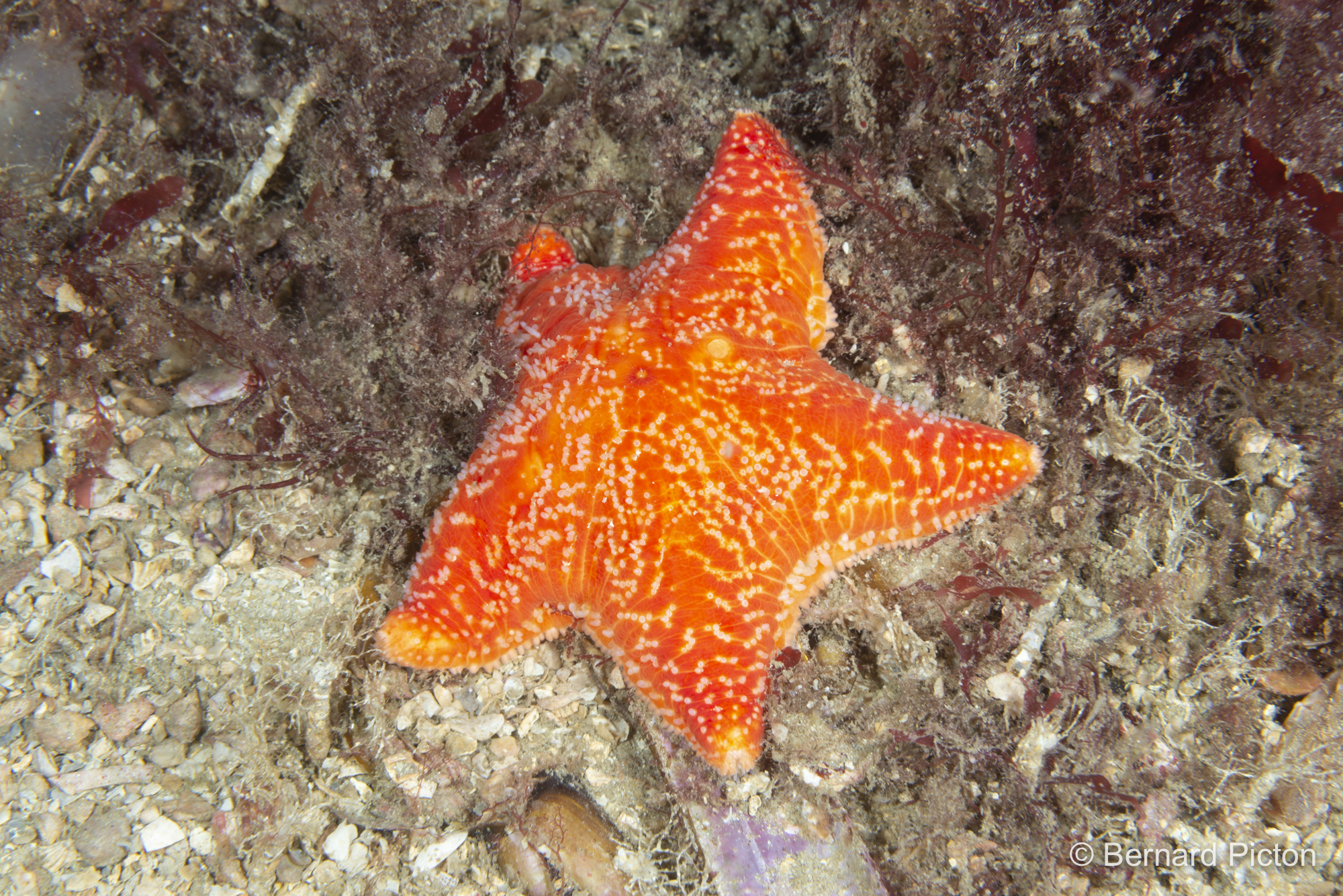
An orange Porania pulvillus

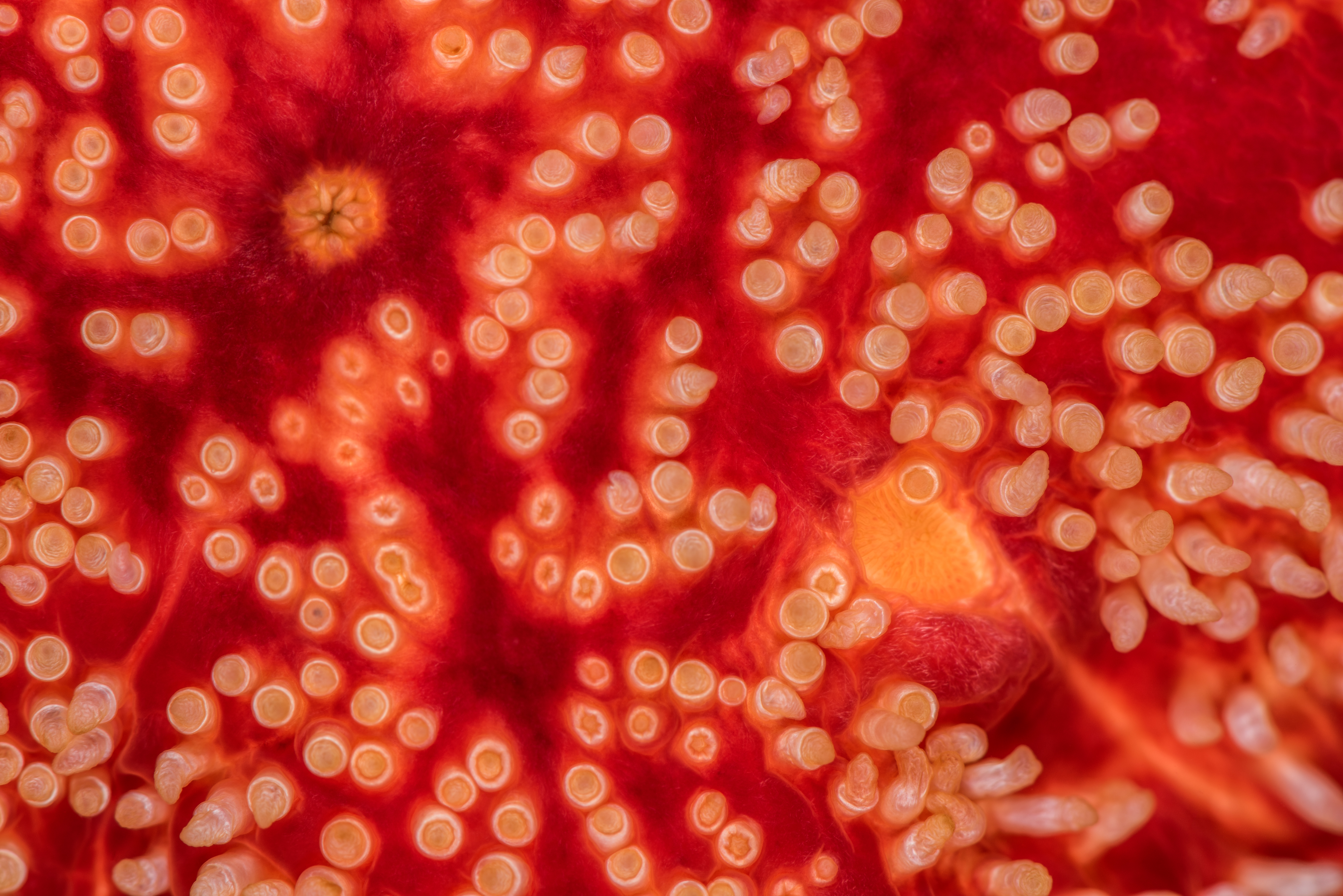
View of spots on aboral surface
