= Oplitis =

Scientific classification
- Domain: Eukaryota
- Kingdom: Animalia
- Phylum: Arthropoda
- Subphylum: Chelicerata
- Class: Arachnida
- Order: Mesostigmata
- Family: Trachyuropodidae
- Genus: Oplitis; Berlese, 1884

Genus of mites

Oplitis is a genus of mites in the family Trachyuropodidae. There are more than 70 described species in Oplitis.

== Species ==
These 74 species belong to the genus Oplitis:

- Oplitis alophora (Berlese, 1903)
- Oplitis angustifolia Hirschmann, 1984
- Oplitis athiasae Hirschmann & Zirngiebl-Nicol, 1973
- Oplitis attaae Hirschmann, 1972
- Oplitis baloghisimilis Hirschmann & Zirngiebl-Nicol, 1973
- Oplitis barbata Hiramatsu, 1978
- Oplitis belizensis Hirschmann, 1991
- Oplitis berleseiphiloctena Hirschmann, 1991
- Oplitis camponoti Hirschmann, 1991
- Oplitis castrii Hirschmann & Zirngiebl-Nicol, 1973
- Oplitis castriisimilis Hirschmann & Zirngiebl-Nicol, 1973
- Oplitis circularis Hiramatsu, 1978
- Oplitis conspicua (Berlese, 1903)
- Oplitis cornelli Hirschmann, 1991
- Oplitis cristobalensis Hirschmann, 1991
- Oplitis cubana Hirschmann, 1991
- Oplitis daressalami Wisniewski, 1980
- Oplitis dictyoeides Hirschmann & Zirngiebl-Nicol, 1973
- Oplitis dimidiata Hirschmann, 1991
- Oplitis dimitiatasimilis Hirschmann & Wisniewski, 1991
- Oplitis ellipsoides Hirschmann, 1991
- Oplitis endrodyi Zirngiebl & Hirshcmann, 1973
- Oplitis euchroeana Hirschmann & Wisniewski, 1991
- Oplitis exopodi Hunter & Farrier, 1975
- Oplitis farrieri Gorirossi Bourdaeu, 1993
- Oplitis floreanae Hirschmann, 1991
- Oplitis fofanai Hirschmann, 1991
- Oplitis franzi Hirschmann & Zirngiebl-Nicol, 1969
- Oplitis ghanaovalis Zirngiebl & Hirschmann, 1973
- Oplitis guineae Hirschmann, 1991
- Oplitis hallidayi Kontschán, 2013
- Oplitis hiramatsui Wisniewski, 1979
- Oplitis hirschmanni Wisniewski, 1979
- Oplitis irae Hirschmann, 1984
- Oplitis labyrinthi Hirschmann, 1984
- Oplitis lapidaria Hirschmann, 1991
- Oplitis lasiocornelli Hirschmann, 1991
- Oplitis lasiorum Hirschmann, 1991
- Oplitis latifolia Hirschmann, 1984
- Oplitis latotutuli Hirschmann, 1984
- Oplitis leonardiana (Berlese, 1903)
- Oplitis maeandralis Hirschmann & Zirngiebl, 1973
- Oplitis marginalis Hirschmann, 1991
- Oplitis mayae Hirschmann, 1991
- Oplitis minutissima (Berlese, 1903)
- Oplitis moseri Hirschmann, 1972
- Oplitis oblita Hirschmann, 1991
- Oplitis ootutuli Hirschmann, 1984
- Oplitis ovatula (Berlese, 1903)
- Oplitis paradoxa G.Canestrini, 1884
- Oplitis pecinai Hirschmann, 1984
- Oplitis pecki Hirschmann, 1991
- Oplitis peckisimilis
- Oplitis philocenta (Trouessart, 1902)
- Oplitis philoctena (Trouessart, 1902)
- Oplitis pusaterii Kontschán, 2012
- Oplitis radiata Hirschmann, 1984
- Oplitis reticulata Zirngiebl & Hirschmann, 1973
- Oplitis ricasoliana (Berlese, 1903)
- Oplitis sarcinulus Hunter & Farrier, 1976
- Oplitis schmitzi (Kneissl, 1908)
- Oplitis solmani
- Oplitis stammeri Hirschmann & Zirngiebl-Nicol, 1961
- Oplitis subcorticalis
- Oplitis szunyeghyi
- Oplitis termitophila Zirngiebl & Hirschmann, 1973
- Oplitis ticumbi
- Oplitis tutuli Hirschmann, 1984
- Oplitis uncinata Zirngiebl & Hirschmann, 1973
- Oplitis uvsnuurensis
- Oplitis wasmanni (Kneissl, 1907)
- Oplitis wisniewskii Hirschmann, 1984
- Oplitis woelkei Hirschmann, 1975
- Oplitis zavattarii Valle, 1955
