= Trachyuropoda =

Scientific classification
- Kingdom: Animalia
- Phylum: Arthropoda
- Subphylum: Chelicerata
- Class: Arachnida
- Order: Mesostigmata
- Family: Trachyuropodidae
- Genus: Trachyuropoda; Berlese, 1888

Genus of mites

Trachyuropoda is a genus of mites in the family Trachyuropodidae. There are more than 30 described species in Trachyuropoda.

== Species ==
These 33 species belong to the genus Trachyuropoda:

- Trachyuropoda ablesi
- Trachyuropoda belunensis (Lombardini, 1962)
- Trachyuropoda berlesiana (Berlese, 1887)
- Trachyuropoda bostocki (Michael, 1894)
- Trachyuropoda canestriniana (Berlese, 1891)
- Trachyuropoda coccinea (Michael, 1891)
- Trachyuropoda cristiceps (G.Canestrini, 1884)
- Trachyuropoda excavata (Wasmann, 1899)
- Trachyuropoda formicaria (Lubbock, 1881)
- Trachyuropoda formicariasimilis
- Trachyuropoda imitans Berlese, 1905
- Trachyuropoda imperforata Berlese, 1904
- Trachyuropoda kiewensis
- Trachyuropoda lagrecai Lombardini, 1947
- Trachyuropoda magna (Leonardi, 1895)
- Trachyuropoda multituberculata
- Trachyuropoda multituberosa (Willmann, 1951)
- Trachyuropoda myrmecophila
- Trachyuropoda pecinai Hirschmann, 1976
- Trachyuropoda ponticuli Karg, 1989
- Trachyuropoda poppi Hirschmann & Zirngiebl-Nicol, 1969
- Trachyuropoda pseudoperforata Lombardini, 1947
- Trachyuropoda quadriauricularia
- Trachyuropoda represa
- Trachyuropoda riccardiana (Leonardi, 1895)
- Trachyuropoda schusterisimilis
- Trachyuropoda sellnicki Hirschmann & Zirngiebl-Nicol, 1969
- Trachyuropoda sinuata Berlese, 1904
- Trachyuropoda triouspis Banks
- Trachyuropoda troguloides (Canestrini & Fanzago, 1877)
- Trachyuropoda tuberosa
- Trachyuropoda wasmanniana Berlese, 1903
- Trachyuropoda willmanni Hirschmann & Zirngiebl-Nicol, 1969
