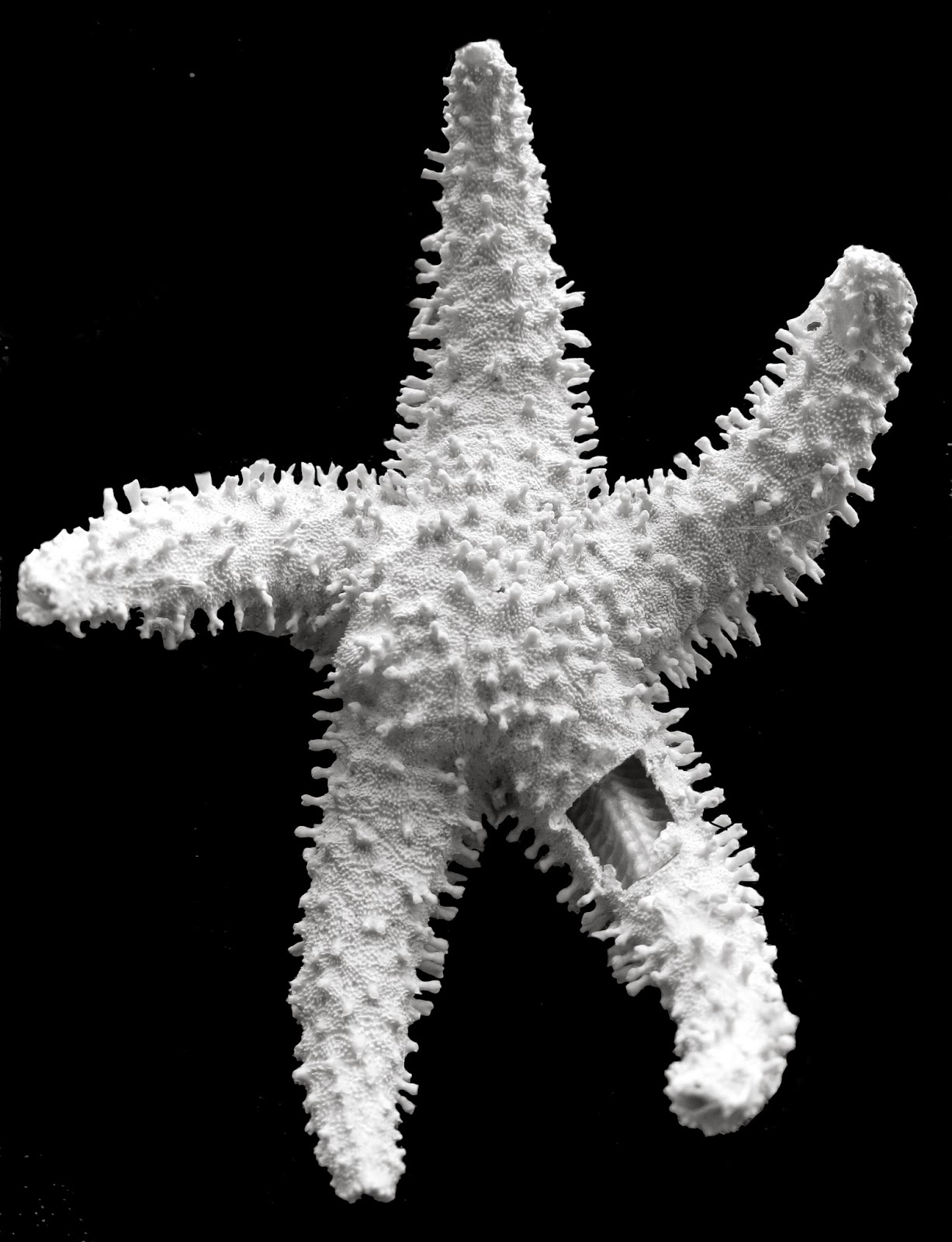
- Scientific picture of a dried C. fitchorum

Scientific classification
- Kingdom: Animalia
- Phylum: Echinodermata
- Class: Asteroidea
- Order: Valvatida
- Family: Poraniidae
- Genus: Clavaporania; Mah & Foltz, 2014
- Species: C. fitchorum

Binomial name
- Clavaporania fitchorum Mah & Foltz, 2014

= Clavaporania =

Genus of starfishes

Clavaporania fitchorum is a species of starfish in the family Poraniidae. It is the only known species of the genus Clavaporania. It is native to the South Pacific Ocean and is found in deep water off the coast of Australia (it was discovered at Hjort Seamount, south of Macquarie Island).

== Description ==
Clavaporania fitchorum has a classical starfish shape with five short arms and a somewhat inflated body. The aboral surface is covered with club-shaped spinelets.

== Distribution ==
Clavaporania fitchorum has been found during a deep-sea survey by the US Antarctic Research Program at Hjort Seamount, off the coast of Macquarie Island, at 1600 meters deep. Even if this was the only recorded observation to date, this species may have a large distribution, as it is often the case with deep-sea species.

== Bibliography ==
- Mah, Christopher L.; Foltz, David W. (May 2014). "New taxa and taxonomic revisions to the Poraniidae (Valvatacea; Asteroidea) with Comments on Feeding Biology". Zootaxa. 3795 (3): 327–372. doi:10.11646/zootaxa.3795.3.7. PMID 24870481..
