= Cariboplitis =

Scientific classification
- Domain: Eukaryota
- Kingdom: Animalia
- Phylum: Arthropoda
- Subphylum: Chelicerata
- Class: Arachnida
- Order: Mesostigmata
- Family: Oplitidae
- Genus: Cariboplitis; Sellnick, 1963

Genus of mites

Cariboplitis is a genus of mites in the family Oplitidae.
