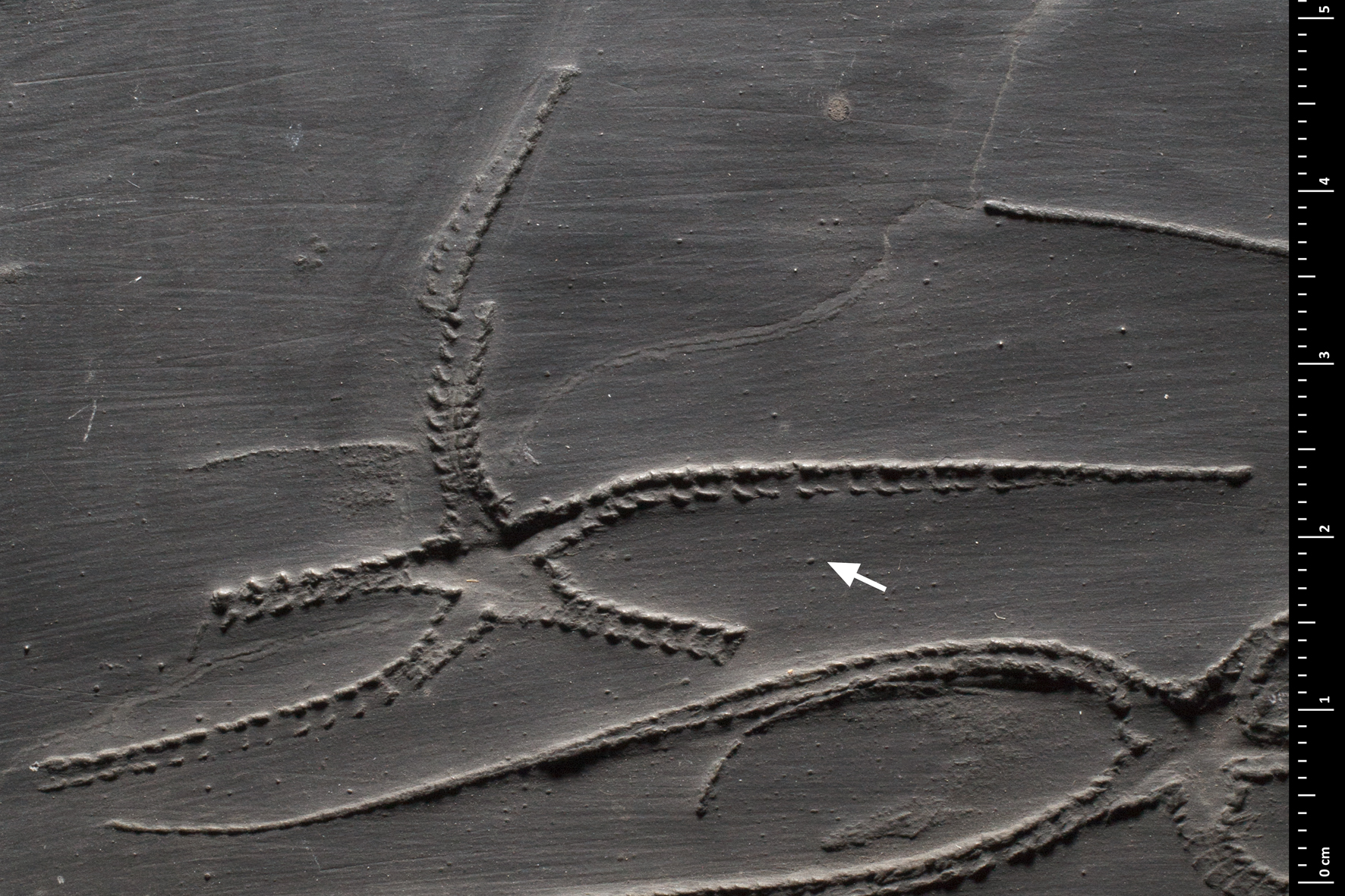
- Furcaster palaeozoicus
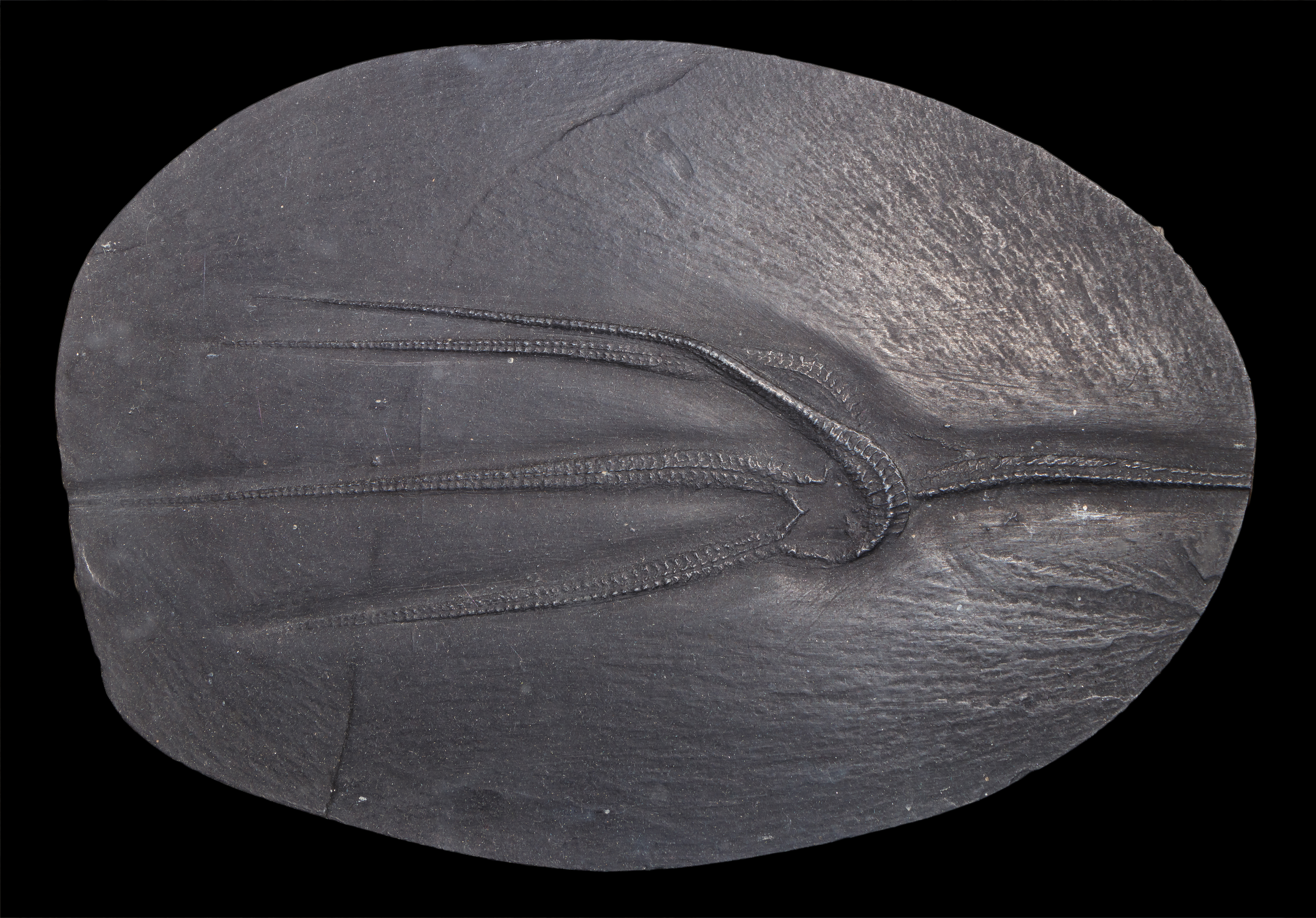
- Furcaster decheni

Scientific classification
- Kingdom: Animalia
- Phylum: Echinodermata
- Class: Ophiuroidea
- Order: †Oegophiurida
- Family: †Protasteridae
- Genus: †Furcaster; Stürtz, 1886

= Furcaster =

Furcaster Temporal range: Silurian–Devonian

Extinct genus of brittle stars

Furcaster is an extinct genus of brittle stars. It lived from the Silurian to Devonian periods. Furcaster palaeozoicus is known from the Hunsrück Slate lagerstätte.
