= Crinitodiscus =

Scientific classification
- Domain: Eukaryota
- Kingdom: Animalia
- Phylum: Arthropoda
- Subphylum: Chelicerata
- Class: Arachnida
- Order: Mesostigmata
- Family: Trachyuropodidae
- Genus: Crinitodiscus; Sellnick, 1932

Genus of mites

Crinitodiscus is a genus of mites in the family Trachyuropodidae. There are at least two described species in Crinitodiscus.

== Species ==
These two species belong to the genus Crinitodiscus:

- Crinitodiscus ayyildizi
- Crinitodiscus ozkani
