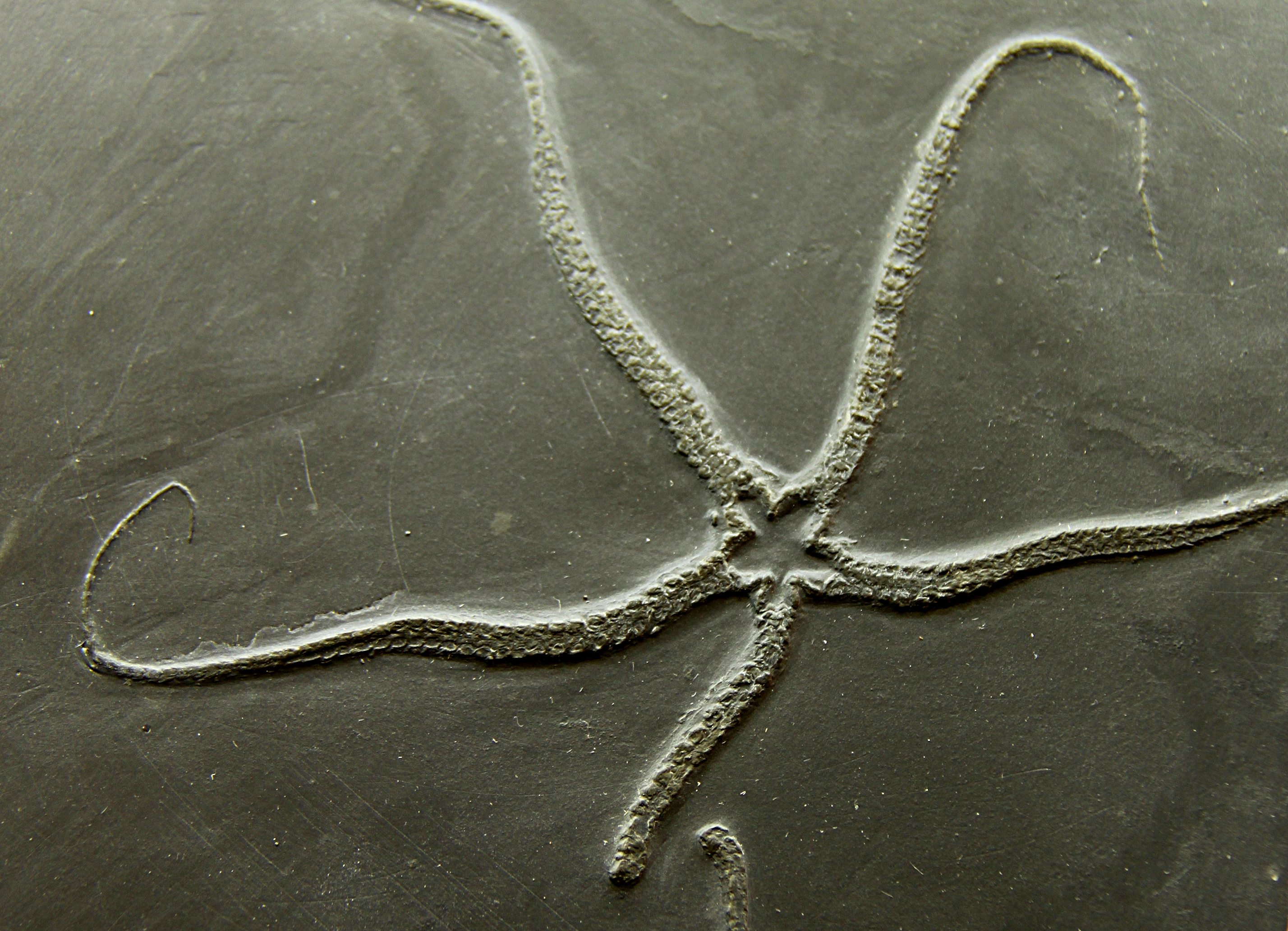
- Furcaster palaeozoicus (Early Devonian)

Scientific classification
- Kingdom: Animalia
- Phylum: Echinodermata
- Class: Ophiuroidea
- Order: †Oegophiurida; Matsumoto, 1915

= Oegophiurida =

Oegophiurida Temporal range: Ordovician–Late Carboniferous

Order of brittle stars

Oegophiurida is an extinct order of primitive brittle stars in the class Ophiuroidea which went extinct in the Late Carboniferous.

The eraliest fossils date back to the Middle Ordovician (circa 460 Ma).

== Characteristics ==
The physical characteristics of this order include well separated lateral plates, which expose the oral surface of radial ossicles. It also has vertebrae with streptospondylous (hourglass) articulation, which thus allow for vertical and horizontal movements. Unlike modern brittle stars which have single chain of vertebral ossicles, these primitive brittle stars had two rows of vertebral ossicles alternating down the arm, giving them a "zippered" appearance.

The order has neither oral nor radial shields. They have paired serial gonads arranged segmentally along the arm. The hyponeural groove is covered by soft integument, which forms a spacious epineural canal that is not closed over by ventral arm plates. The disk is covered by naked or granulated skin, or by imbricating scales.

The species Ophiocanops fugiens was previously classified as belonging to this order but has since been allocated to the order Ophiacanthida.

== Taxonomy ==
The classification is as follows.

- Family †Encrinasteridae
  - †Armathyraster Harper & Morris, 1978
  - †Crepidosoma Spencer, 1930
  - †Euzonosoma Spencer, 1930
  - †Krommaster Reddy, Thuy, Reid & Gess, 2023
  - †Loriolaster Stürtz, 1886
  - †Marginix Martínez & del Río, 2015
  - †Mastigactis Spencer, 1930
  - †Ophiocantabria Blake, Zamora & García-Alcalde, 2015
- Family †Furcasteridae Stürtz, 1899
  - †Furcaster Stürtz, 1886
  - †Tremataster Worthen & Miller, 1883
