= El Freisnu (Grado) =

- Parish
- Location within Spain
- Country: Spain
- Autonomous community: Asturias
- Province: Asturias
- Municipality: Grado

El Freisnu (Asturian pronunciation: [ˈel ˈfɾei̯znu]) is one of 28 parishes (administrative divisions) in the municipality of Grado, within the province and autonomous community of Asturias, in northern Spain.

The population is 140 (INE 2007).

== Villages and hamlets ==
=== Villages ===
- Álvare
- El Bondéu
- La Caridá
- Los Fornos
- El Freisnu
- Los Macetes
- Las Novales
- La Tronca

=== Hamlets ===
- En Ca Cuervu
- El Cabañón
- La Caleona
- El Camín
- La Casanueva
- La Casteñal Barrida
- El Corru Camín
- Curueza
- La Fayada
- La Grana
- La Llinar
- La Pelona
- Pobladura
- Requeixada
- El Sucu
- La Torre
- La Venta
- Zreizaléu
