= Trachyuropodidae =

Scientific classification
- Kingdom: Animalia
- Phylum: Arthropoda
- Subphylum: Chelicerata
- Class: Arachnida
- Order: Mesostigmata
- Suborder: Monogynaspida
- Infraorder: Uropodina
- Superfamily: Uropodoidea
- Family: Trachyuropodidae; Kramer, 1881

Family of mites

Trachyuropodidae is a family of mites in the order Mesostigmata.

== Species ==
- Capitodiscus Vitzthum, 1931
  - Capitodiscus venusta (Berlese, 1884)
- Cephalouropoda Berlese, 1903
  - Cephalouropoda berlesiana (Berlese, 1887)
- Crinitodiscus Sellnick, 1931
  - Crinitodiscus beieri (Sellnick, 1931)
  - Crinitodiscus pawlowskii Athias-Binche & Bloszyk, 1985
  - Crinitodiscus rafalskii Athias-Binche & Bloszyk, 1985
- Phymatodiscus Berlese, 1917
  - Phymatodiscus aokii Hiramatsu, 1985
  - Phymatodiscus coniferus (Canestrini, 1897)
  - Phymatodiscus haradai Hiramatsu, 1985
  - Phymatodiscus ignesemovens Hirschmann, 1977
  - Phymatodiscus iriomotensis Hiramatsu, 1979
  - Phymatodiscus mirabilis Hirschmann, 1977
  - Phymatodiscus mirandus (Berlese, 1905)
  - Phymatodiscus oculatus Hirschmann, 1977
  - Phymatodiscus polyglottis Hirschmann, 1977
  - Phymatodiscus titanicus (Berlese, 1905)
- Trachyuropoda Berlese, 1888
  - Trachyuropoda ablesi Hirschmann, 1976
  - Trachyuropoda alapaducta Hirschmann, 1976
  - Trachyuropoda angustioculata Hirschmann, 1976
  - Trachyuropoda arculata Hirschmann, 1975
  - Trachyuropoda athiasae Hirschmann, 1975
  - Trachyuropoda auricularia Costa, 1962
  - Trachyuropoda auricularis (Hull, 1923)
  - Trachyuropoda baloghi Hirschmann, 1976
  - Trachyuropoda baloghisimüis Hirschmann, 1976
  - Trachyuropoda belunensis (Lombardini, 1962)
  - Trachyuropoda berlesesellnickia Hirschmann, 1976
  - Trachyuropoda boliviensis Hirschmann, 1976
  - Trachyuropoda borinqueni Fox, 1957
  - Trachyuropoda bostocki (Michael, 1894)
  - Trachyuropoda canestriniana (Berlese, 1891)
  - Trachyuropoda castrii Hirschmann, 1975
  - Trachyuropoda céltica Halbert, 1907
  - Trachyuropoda cistulata Hirschmann, 1975
  - Trachyuropoda constricta Banks, 1916
  - Trachyuropoda cristiceps (G. Canestrini, 1884)
  - Trachyuropoda dacica Hutu, 1973
  - Trachyuropoda dicarinata Hirschmann, 1976
  - Trachyuropoda dicarinatasimilis Hirschmann, 1976
  - Trachyuropoda dictyoeides Hirschmann, 1976
  - Trachyuropoda difoveolata Hirschmann, 1975
  - Trachyuropoda elegantula Trägårdh, 1952
  - Trachyuropoda endrodyi Hirschmann, 1976
  - Trachyuropoda excavata (Wasmann, 1899)
  - Trachyuropoda festiva (Berlese, 1888)
  - Trachyuropoda foliitricha Hirschmann, 1977
  - Trachyuropoda ghanaensis Hirschmann, 1976
  - Trachyuropoda gracilis Hirschmann, 1976
  - Trachyuropoda graeca Sellnick, 1931
  - Trachyuropoda hexaspinosa Hirschmann, 1976
  - Trachyuropoda hirschmanni Pecina, 1980
  - Trachyuropoda imitans Berlese, 1905
  - Trachyuropoda imperforata Berlese, 1904
  - Trachyuropoda kiewensis Hirschmann, 1976
  - Trachyuropoda kinsella Kontschán, 2010
  - Trachyuropoda lagrecai Lombardini, 1947
  - Trachyuropoda leai Banks, 1916
  - Trachyuropoda lindquisti Hirschmann, 1976
  - Trachyuropoda longicornuta Hirschmann, 1976
  - Trachyuropoda longicornutasimilis Hirschmann, 1976
  - Trachyuropoda magna (Leonardi, 1895)
  - Trachyuropoda mahunkai Hirschmann, 1976
  - Trachyuropoda margaritaensis Hirschmann, 1979
  - Trachyuropoda matsuurai Hiramatsu, 1980
  - Trachyuropoda mesofovea Hirschmann, 1976
  - Trachyuropoda mesofoveasimilis Hirschmann, 1976
  - Trachyuropoda mexicana Hirschmann, 1976
  - Trachyuropoda michaeli (Ewing, 1909)
  - Trachyuropoda micherdzinskii Hirschmann, 1976
  - Trachyuropoda multituberculata Hirschmann, 1976
  - Trachyuropoda multituberosa (Willmann, 1951)
  - Trachyuropoda myrmecophila Wisniewski & Hirschmann, 1992
  - Trachyuropoda nicolae Hirschmann, 1976
  - Trachyuropoda origmophora Hirschmann, 1976
  - Trachyuropoda pecinai Hirschmann, 1976
  - Trachyuropoda plagiata Hirschmann, 1976
  - Trachyuropoda ponticuli Karg, 1989
  - Trachyuropoda poppi Hirschmann & Zirngiebl-Nicol, 1969
  - Trachyuropoda pseudoperforata Lombardini, 1947
  - Trachyuropoda quadriauricularia Hirschmann, 1976
  - Trachyuropoda quadricarinata Hirschmann, 1976
  - Trachyuropoda quadricornuta Hirschmann, 1976
  - Trachyuropoda ramitricha Hirschmann, 1977
  - Trachyuropoda represa Hirschmann, 1976
  - Trachyuropoda reticulata Hirschmann, 1976
  - Trachyuropoda riccardiana (Leonardi, 1895)
  - Trachyuropoda rufipes Hirschmann, 1976
  - Trachyuropoda schusteri Hirschmann, 1976
  - Trachyuropoda schusterisimilis Hirschmann, 1976
  - Trachyuropoda sellnicki Hirschmann & Zirngiebl-Nicol, 1969
  - Trachyuropoda septentrionalis Berlese, 1904
  - Trachyuropoda similiarculata Hirschmann, 1975
  - Trachyuropoda similiathiasae Hiramatsu, 1979
  - Trachyuropoda similicoccinea Hiramatsu, 1979
  - Trachyuropoda sinuata Berlese, 1904
  - Trachyuropoda termitophila Trägårdh, 1906
  - Trachyuropoda transversaria Hirschmann, 1976
  - Trachyuropoda trinidadis Hirschmann, 1976
  - Trachyuropoda troguloides (Gervais, 1844)
  - Trachyuropoda tuberculata Berlese, 1913
  - Trachyuropoda tuberculatotransversaria Hirschmann, 1976
  - Trachyuropoda tuberosa Hirschmann, 1976
  - Trachyuropoda vulgaris Hirschmann, 1976
  - Trachyuropoda wasmanniana Berlese, 1903
  - Trachyuropoda whitkombi Hirschmann, 1975
  - Trachyuropoda willmanni Hirschmann & Zirngiebl-Nicol, 1969
  - Trachyuropoda woelkei Hirschmann, 1976
  - Trachyuropoda zicsii Hirschmann, 1976
- Urojanetia Berlese, 1917
  - Urojanetia coccinea (Michael, 1891)
  - Urojanetia stoechas (Athias-Binche, 1988)
- Urotrachys Berlese, 1903
  - Urotrachys formicaria (Lubbock, 1881)
  - Urotrachys formicariasimilis (Hirschmann, 1975)
