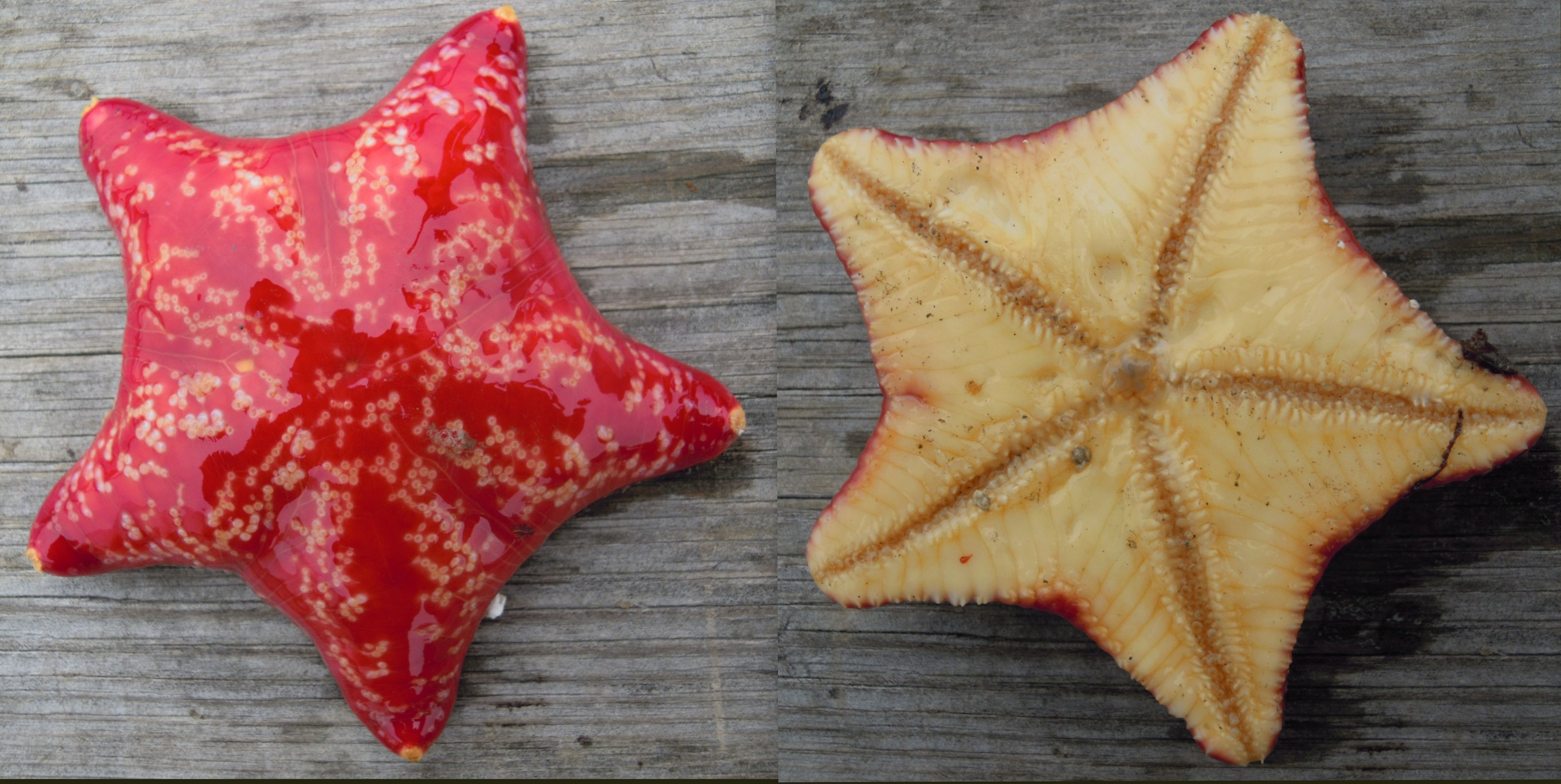
- Aboral and oral surfaces of Porania pulvillus

Scientific classification
- Kingdom: Animalia
- Phylum: Echinodermata
- Class: Asteroidea
- Order: Valvatida
- Family: Poraniidae; Perrier, 1875

Genera
- 11, see text

= Poraniidae =

Family of starfishes

Poraniidae is a family of starfishes in the order Valvatida.

== Characteristics ==
Members of the family Poraniidae have a moderately well-developed row of marginal plates forming a distinct margin along the edge of both disc and arms. The aboral surface is covered with thick, naked skin, free from spines or pedicellariae but with scattered groups of papulae. There are no papulae or pedicellariae on the oral surface and the tube feet are always in two series.

== Genera ==
This family includes the following genera according to the World Register of Marine Species:

- Bathyporania Mah & Foltz, 2014
- Chondraster Verrill, 1895
- Clavaporania Mah & Foltz, 2014
- Culcitopsis Verrill, 1914
- Glabraster A.H. Clark, 1916
- Marginaster Perrier, 1881
- Porania Gray, 1840
- Poraniomorpha Danielssen & Koren, 1881
- Poraniopsis Perrier, 1891
- Spoladaster Fisher, 1940
- Tylaster Danielssen & Koren, 1881
