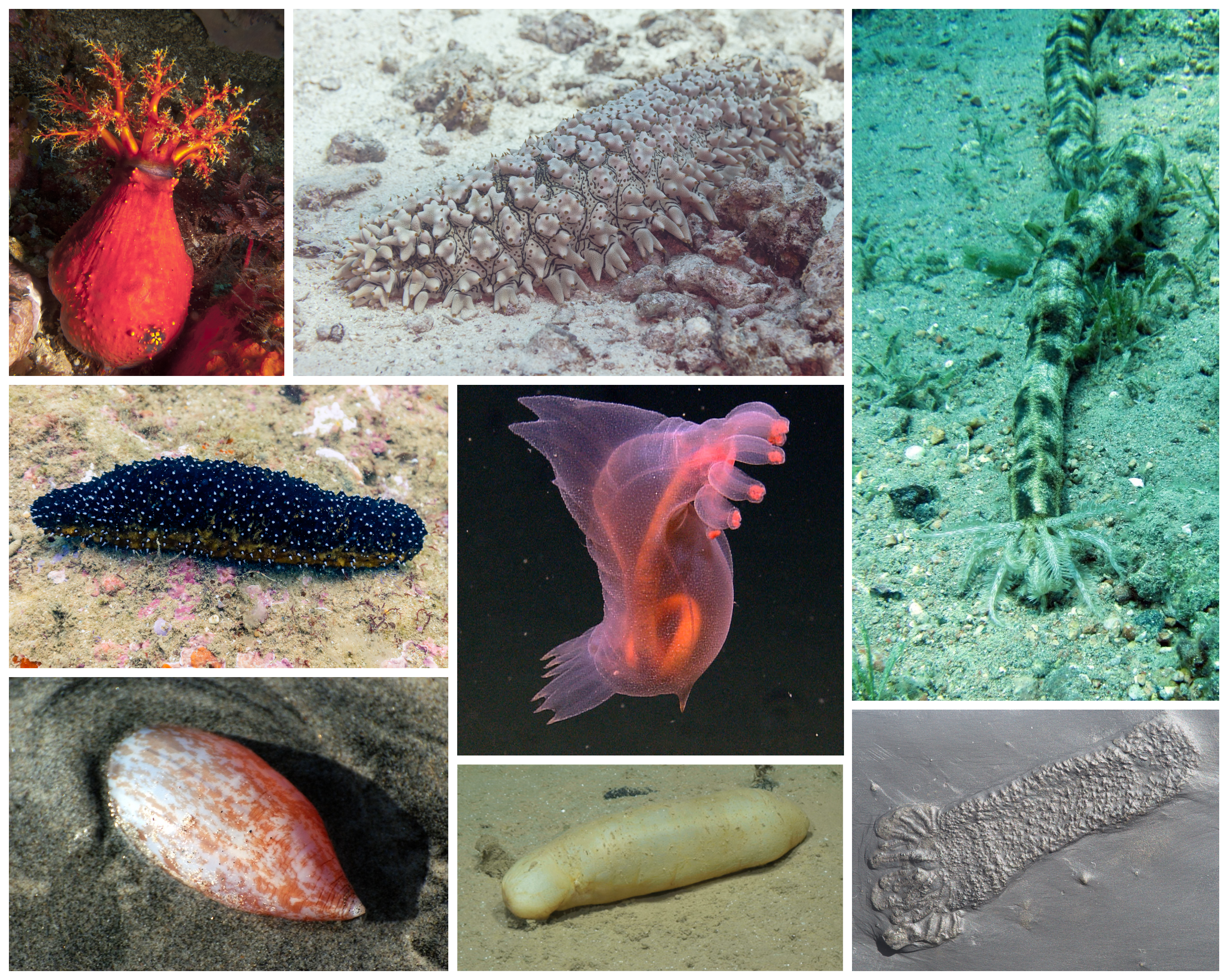
- Members of each of the 8 orders in Holothuroidea (from left to right, top to bottom): Pseudocolochirus sp. (Dendrochirotida), Thelenota ananas (Synallactida), Synapta maculata (Apodida), Holothuria forskali (Holothuriida), Enypniastes sp. (Elasipodida), Caudina arenicola (Molpadida), Molpadiodemas stet. (Persiculida), Palaeocucumaria hunsrueckiana (Arthrochirotida)

Scientific classification
- Kingdom: Animalia
- Phylum: Echinodermata
- Subphylum: Echinozoa
- Class: Holothuroidea; Blainville, 1834

Orders
- Apodida Brandt, 1835; †Arthrochirotida Seilacher, 1961; Dendrochirotida Grube, 1840; Elasipodida Théel, 1882; Holothuriida Miller, Kerr, Paulay, Reich, Wilson, Carvajal & Rouse, 2017; Molpadida Haeckel, 1896; Persiculida Miller, Kerr, Paulay, Reich, Wilson, Carvajal & Rouse, 2017; Synallactida Miller, Kerr, Paulay, Reich, Wilson, Carvajal & Rouse, 2017

Diversity
- ~1,430 species

= Sea cucumber =

Sea cucumber Temporal range: Middle Ordovician (early Darriwilian)–Present

Class of echinoderms

Sea cucumbers are echinoderms from the class Holothuroidea (/ˌhɒləˌθjʊəˈrɔɪdiə, ˌhoʊlə-/ HOL-ə-thyuu-ROY-dee-ə, HOH-lə-). They are benthic marine animals found on the sea floor worldwide, and the number of known holothuroid species worldwide is about 1,786, with the greatest number being in the Asia–Pacific region. Sea cucumbers serve a useful role in the marine ecosystem as detritivores who help recycle nutrients, breaking down detritus and other organic matter, after which microbes can continue the decomposition process.

Sea cucumbers have a leathery skin and an elongated body containing a single, branched gonad; they are named for their overall resemblance to the fruit of the cucumber plant. Like all echinoderms, sea cucumbers have a calcified dermal endoskeleton, which is usually reduced to isolated microscopic ossicles (or sclerites) joined by connective tissue. In some species these can sometimes be enlarged to flattened plates, forming an armoured cuticle. In some abyssal or pelagic species such as Pelagothuria natatrix (order Elasipodida, family Pelagothuriidae), the skeleton is absent and there is no calcareous ring.

Many species of sea cucumbers are foraged as food by humans, and some species are cultivated in aquaculture systems. They are considered a delicacy seafood, especially in Asian cuisines, and the harvested product is variously referred to as trepang, namako, bêche-de-mer, or balate.

== Overview ==
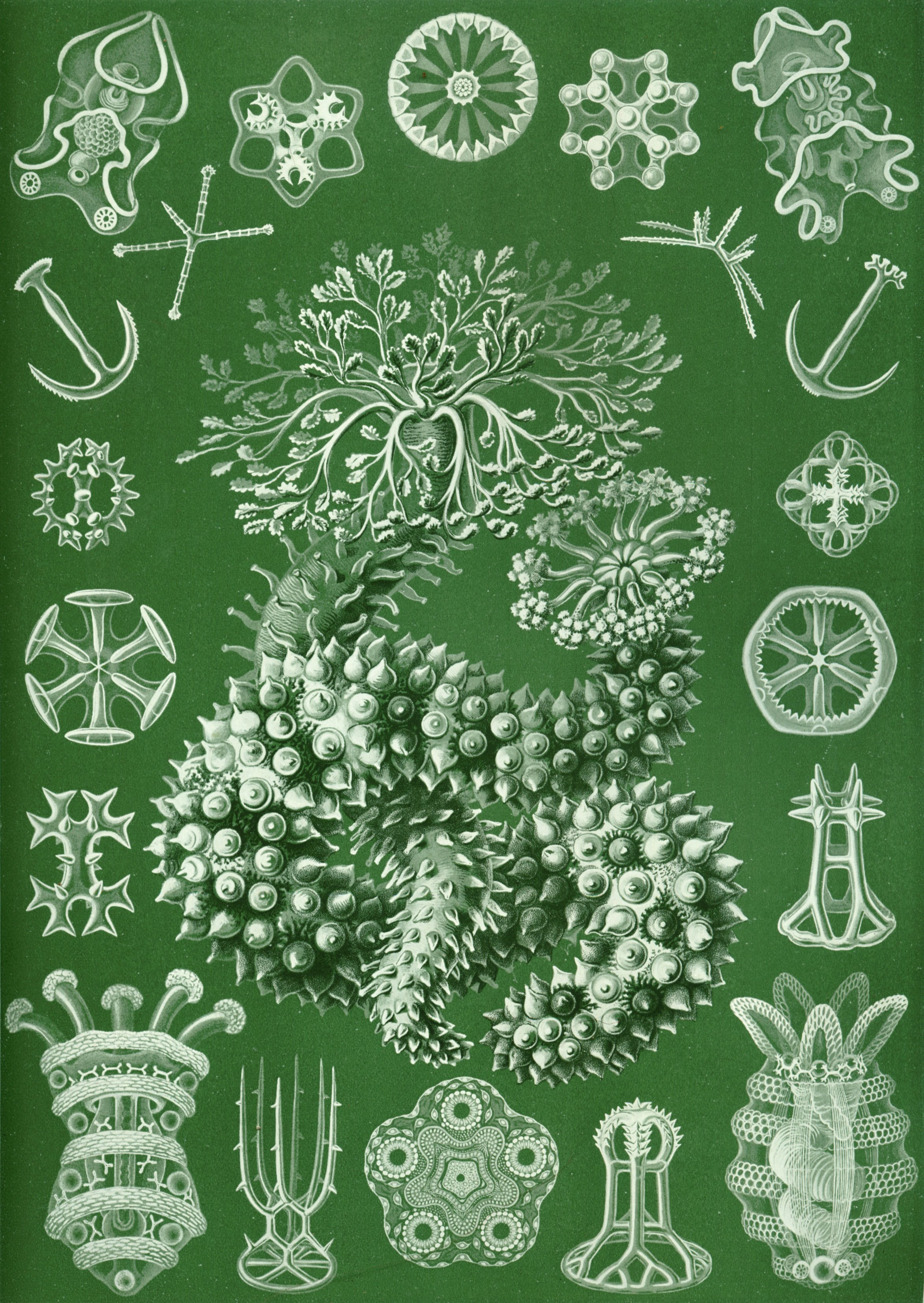
Holothurians plate by Ernst Haeckel from his Kunstformen der Natur (1904)

Most sea cucumbers have a soft and cylindrical body, rounded off and occasionally fat in the extremities, and generally without solid appendages. Their shape ranges from almost spherical for "sea apples" (genus Pseudocolochirus) to serpent-like for Apodida or the classic sausage-shape, while others resemble caterpillars. The mouth is surrounded by tentacles, which can be pulled back inside the animal. Holothuroids measure generally between 10 and 30 centimetres (3.9 and 11.8 in) long, with extremes of some millimetres for Rhabdomolgus ruber and up to more than 3 metres (9.8 ft) for Synapta maculata. The largest American species, Holothuria floridana, which abounds just below low-water mark on the Florida reefs, has a volume of well over 500 cubic centimeters (31 cu in), and 25–30 cm (10–12 in) long. Most possess five rows of tube feet (called "podia"), but Apodida lacks these and moves by crawling; the podia can be of smooth aspect or provided with fleshy appendages (like Thelenota ananas). The podia on the dorsal surface generally have no locomotive role, and are transformed into papillae. At one of the extremities opens a rounded mouth, generally surrounded with a crown of tentacles which can be very complex in some species (they are in fact modified podia); the anus is postero-dorsal.

Holothuroids do not look like other echinoderms at first glance, because of their tubular body, without visible skeleton nor hard appendixes. Furthermore, the fivefold symmetry, classical for echinoderms, although preserved structurally, is doubled here by a bilateral symmetry which makes them look like chordates. However, a central symmetry is still visible in some species through five 'radii', which extend from the mouth to the anus (just like for sea urchins), on which the tube feet are attached. There is thus no "oral" or "aboral" face as for sea stars and other echinoderms, but the animal stands on one of its sides, and this face is called trivium (with three rows of tube feet), while the dorsal face is named bivium. A remarkable feature of these animals is the "catch" collagen that forms their body wall. (Note: "Catch" collagen has two states, soft and stiff, that are under neurological control.Jose del Castillo and David S. Smith. (1996) "We Still Invoke Friction and Occam's Razor to Explain Catch in the Spines of Eucidaris Tribuloides." Biological Bulletin 190:243-244) This can be loosened and tightened at will, and if the animal wants to squeeze through a small gap, it can essentially liquefy its body and pour into the space. To keep itself safe in these crevices and cracks, the sea cucumber will hook up all its collagen fibers to make its body firm again.

The most common way to separate the subclasses is by looking at their oral tentacles. Order Apodida have a slender and elongate body lacking tube feet, with up to 25 simple or pinnate oral tentacles. Aspidochirotida are the most common sea cucumbers encountered, with a strong body and 10 to 30 leaflike or shield-like oral tentacles. Dendrochirotida are filter-feeders, with plump bodies and eight to 30 branched oral tentacles (which can be extremely long and complex).

== Anatomy ==
Sea cucumbers are typically 10 to 30 cm (4 to 12 in) in length, although the smallest known species are just 3 mm (0.12 in) long, and the largest can reach 3 meters (10 ft). The body ranges from almost spherical to worm-like, and lacks the arms found in many other echinoderms, such as starfish. The anterior end of the animal, containing the mouth, corresponds to the oral pole of other echinoderms (which, in most cases, is the underside), while the posterior end, containing the anus, corresponds to the aboral pole. Thus, compared with other echinoderms, sea cucumbers can be said to be lying on their side.

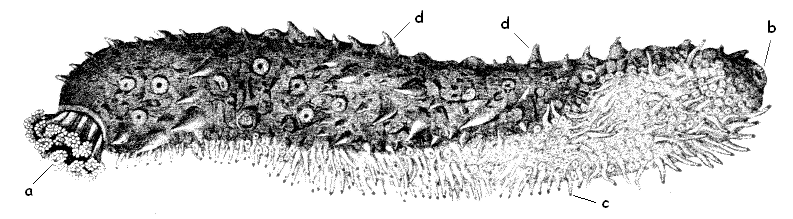
Anatomy of a sea cucumber
a - Tentacles, b - Cloaca, c - Ambulacral feet on the ventral side, d - Papillae on the back

=== Body plan ===
The body of a holothuroid is roughly cylindrical. It is radially symmetrical along its longitudinal axis, and has weak bilateral symmetry transversely with a dorsal and a ventral surface. As in other echinozoans, there are five ambulacra separated by five ambulacral grooves, the interambulacra. The ambulacral grooves bear four rows of tube feet but these are diminished in size or absent in some holothuroids, especially on the dorsal surface. The two dorsal ambulacra make up the bivium while the three ventral ones are known as the trivium.

At the anterior end, the mouth is surrounded by a ring of tentacles which are highly modified tube feet, and are usually retractable into the mouth. They may be simple, branched or arborescent. They are known as the introvert and posterior to them there is an internal ring of large calcareous ossicles. Attached to this are five bands of muscle running internally longitudinally along the ambulacra. There are also circular muscles, contraction of which cause the animal to elongate and the introvert to extend. Anterior to the ossicles lie further muscles, contraction of which cause the introvert to retract.

The body wall consists of an epidermis and a dermis and contains smaller calcareous ossicles, the types of which are characteristics which help to identify different species. Inside the body wall is the coelom which is divided by three longitudinal mesenteries which surround and support the internal organs.

=== Digestive system ===
A pharynx lies behind the mouth and is surrounded by a ring of ten calcareous plates. In most sea cucumbers, this is the only substantial part of the skeleton, and it forms the point of attachment for muscles that can retract the tentacles into the body for safety as for the main muscles of the body wall. Many species possess an oesophagus and stomach, but in some the pharynx opens directly into the intestine. The intestine is typically long and coiled, and loops through the body three times before terminating in a cloacal chamber, or directly as the anus.

=== Nervous system ===
Sea cucumbers have no true brain. A ring of neural tissue surrounds the oral cavity, and sends nerves to the tentacles and the pharynx. The animal is, however, quite capable of functioning and moving about if the nerve ring is surgically removed, demonstrating that it does not have a central role in nervous coordination. In addition, five major nerves run from the nerve ring down the length of the body beneath each of the ambulacral areas.

Most sea cucumbers have no distinct sensory organs, although there are various nerve endings scattered through the skin, giving the animal a sense of touch and a sensitivity to the presence of light. There are, however, a few exceptions: members of the Apodida order are known to possess statocysts, while some species possess small eye-spots near the bases of their tentacles.

=== Respiratory system ===
Sea cucumbers use cloacal respiration via a pair of "respiratory trees" that branch in the cloaca just inside the anus, so that they "breathe" by drawing water in through the anus, extracting dissolved oxygen from water, and then expelling it. The "trees" consist of a series of narrow tubules branching from a common duct, and lie on either side of the digestive tract. Gas exchange occurs across the thin walls of the tubules, to and from the fluid of the main body cavity.

Together with the intestine, the "respiratory trees" also act as excretory organs, with nitrogenous waste diffusing across the tubule walls in the form of ammonia and phagocytic coelomocytes depositing particulate waste.

=== Circulatory systems ===
Like all echinoderms, sea cucumbers possess both a water vascular system that provides hydraulic pressure to the tentacles and tube feet, allowing them to move, and a haemal system. The latter is more complex than that in other echinoderms, and consists of well-developed vessels as well as open sinuses.

A central haemal ring surrounds the pharynx next to the ring canal of the water vascular system, and sends off additional vessels along the radial canals beneath the ambulacral areas. In the larger species, additional vessels run above and below the intestine and are connected by over a hundred small muscular ampullae, acting as miniature hearts to pump blood around the haemal system. Additional vessels surround the respiratory trees, although they contact them only indirectly, via the coelomic fluid.

Indeed, the blood itself is essentially identical with the coelomic fluid that bathes the organs directly, and also fills the water vascular system. Phagocytic coelomocytes, somewhat similar in function to the white blood cells of vertebrates, are formed within the haemal vessels, and travel throughout the body cavity as well as both circulatory systems. An additional form of coelomocyte, not found in other echinoderms, has a flattened discoid shape, and contains hemoglobin. As a result, in many (though not all) species, both the blood and the coelomic fluid are red in colour.

Vanadium has been reported in high concentrations in holothuroid blood, however researchers have been unable to reproduce these results.

=== Locomotive organs ===
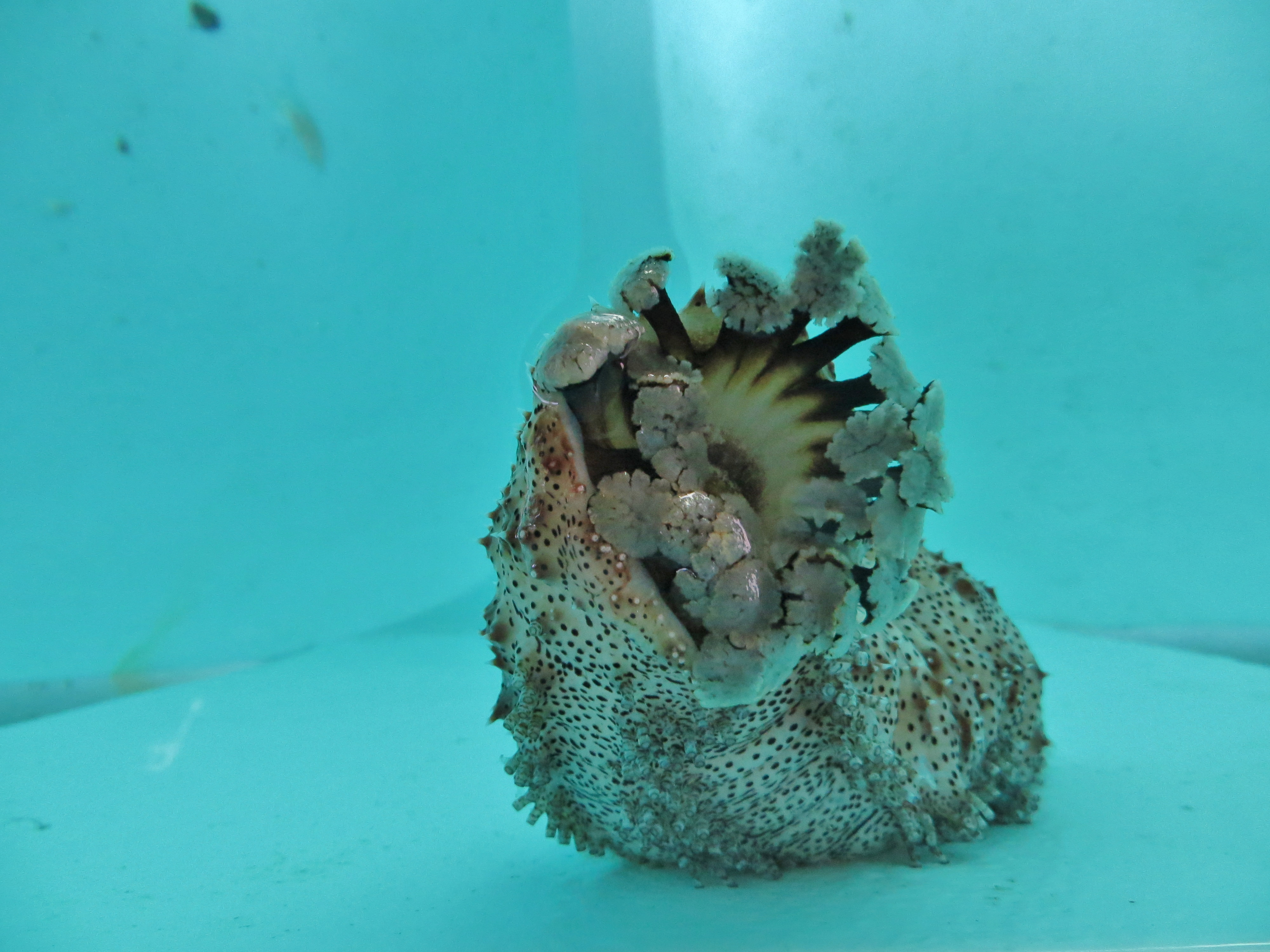
Pearsonothuria graeffei showing its three rows of podia on its trivium

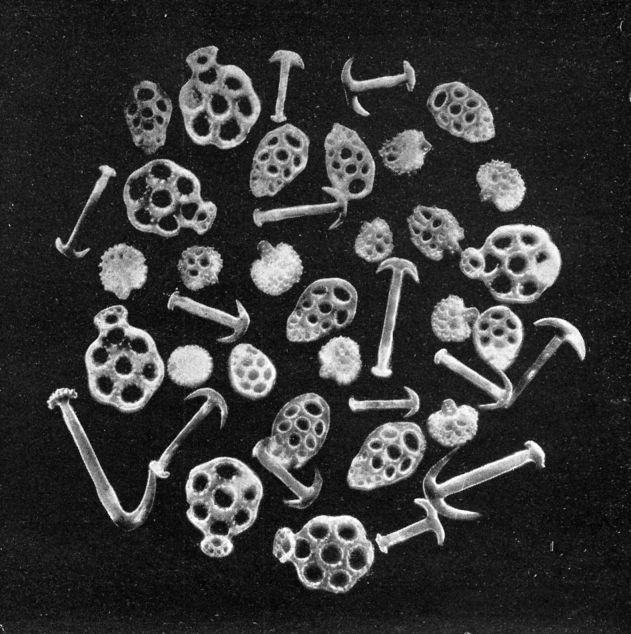
Sea cucumber ossicles (here "wheels" and "anchors")

Like all echinoderms, sea cucumbers possess pentaradial symmetry, with their bodies divided into five nearly identical parts around a central axis. However, because of their posture, they have secondarily evolved a degree of bilateral symmetry. For example, because one side of the body is typically pressed against the substratum, and the other is not, there is usually some difference between the two surfaces (except for Apodida). Like sea urchins, most sea cucumbers have five strip-like ambulacral areas running along the length of the body from the mouth to the anus. The three on the lower surface have numerous tube feet, often with suckers, that allow the animal to crawl along; they are called trivium. The two on the upper surface have under-developed or vestigial tube feet, and some species lack tube feet altogether; this face is called bivium.

In some species, the ambulacral areas can no longer be distinguished, with tube feet spread over a much wider area of the body. Those of the order Apodida have no tube feet or ambulacral areas at all, and burrow through sediment with muscular contractions of their body similar to that of worms, however five radial lines are generally still obvious along their body.

Even in those sea cucumbers that lack regular tube feet, those that are immediately around the mouth are always present. These are highly modified into retractile tentacles, much larger than the locomotive tube feet. Depending on the species, sea cucumbers have between 10 and 30 such tentacles and these can have a wide variety of shapes depending on the diet of the animal and other conditions.

Many sea cucumbers have papillae, conical fleshy projections of the body wall with sensory tube feet at their apices. These can even evolve into long antennae-like structures, especially on the abyssal genus Scotoplanes.

=== Endoskeleton ===
Echinoderms typically possess an internal skeleton composed of plates of calcium carbonate within the dermis. In most sea cucumbers, however, these have become reduced to microscopic ossicles embedded beneath the skin. A few genera, such as Sphaerothuria, retain relatively large plates, giving them a scaly armour.

== Life history and behaviour ==
=== Habitat ===
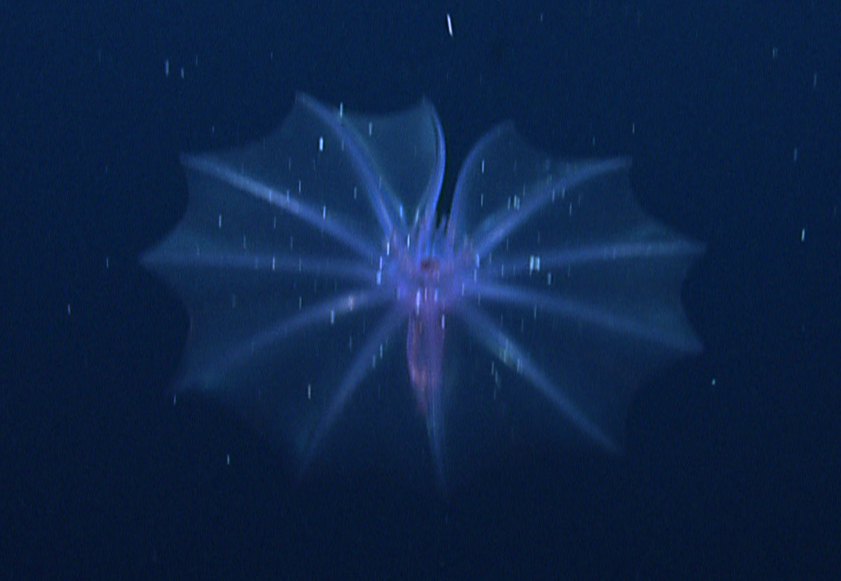
The mysterious Pelagothuria natatrix is the only truly pelagic echinoderm known to date.

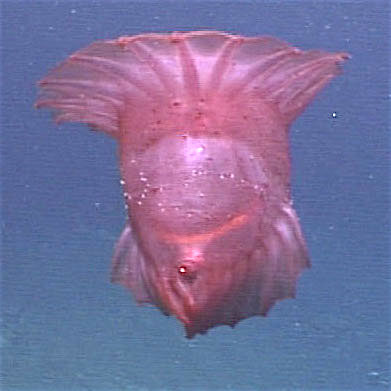
Benthopelagic sea cucumbers, such as this Enypniastes, are often confused with jellyfish, have webbed swimming structures enabling them to swim up off the surface of the seafloor and journey as much as 1,000 metres (3,300 ft) up the water column

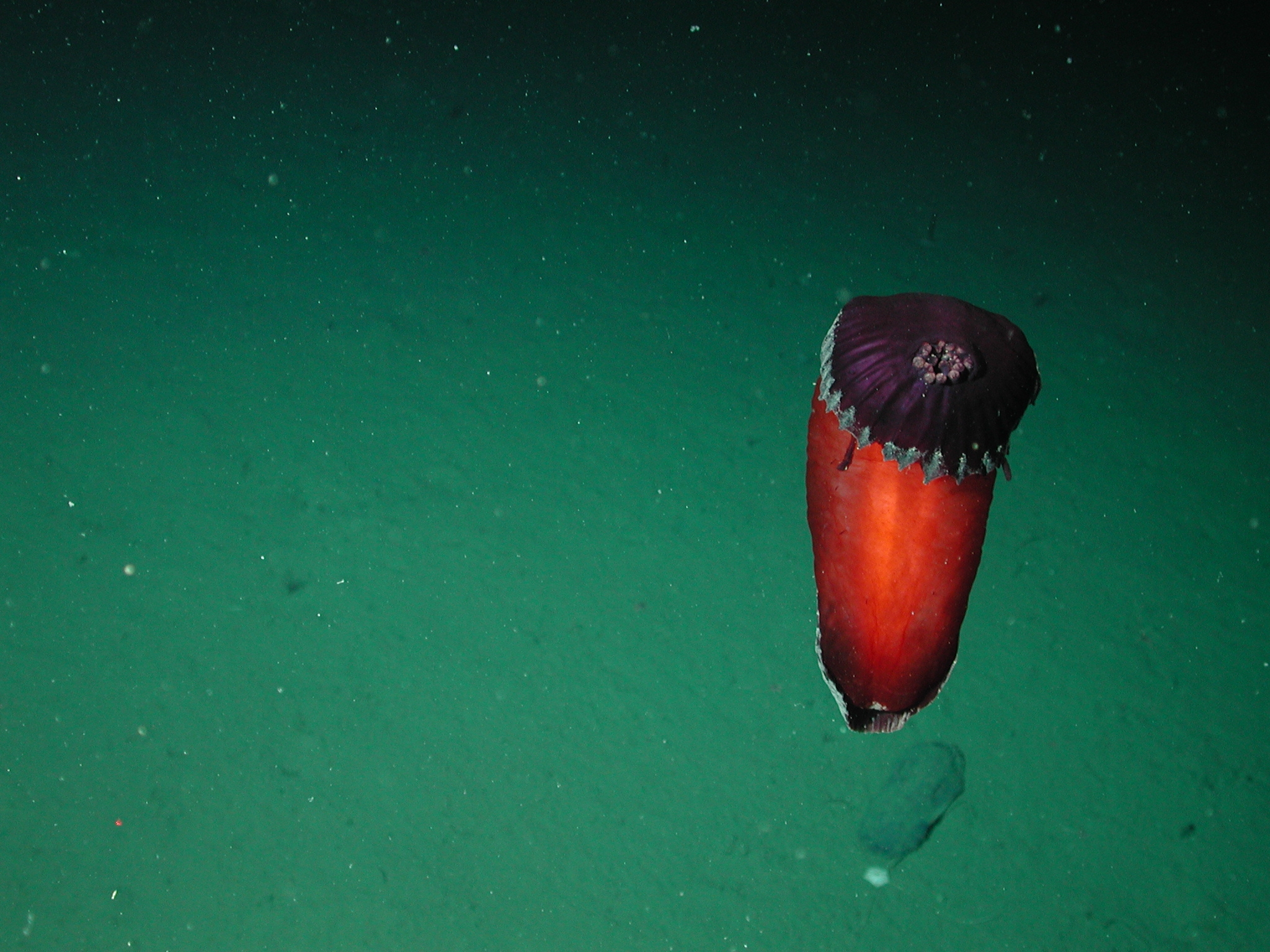
Spanish dancer (Benthodytes sp.), another swimming sea cucumber, hovering at 2,789 metres (9,150 ft) by the Davidson Seamount

Sea cucumbers can be found in great numbers on the deep seafloor, where they often make up the majority of the animal biomass. At depths deeper than 8,900 m (5.5 mi), sea cucumbers comprise 90% of the total mass of the macrofauna. Sea cucumbers form large herds that move across the bathygraphic features of the ocean, hunting food. The body of some deep water holothuroids, such as Enypniastes eximia, Peniagone leander and Paelopatides confundens, is made of a tough gelatinous tissue with unique properties that makes the animals able to control their own buoyancy, making it possible for them to either live on the ocean floor or to actively swim or float over it in order to move to new locations, in a manner similar to how the group Torquaratoridae floats through water.

Holothuroids appear to be the echinoderms best adapted to extreme depths, and are still very diversified beyond 5,000 metres (16,000 ft) deep: several species from the family Elpidiidae ("sea pigs") can be found deeper than 9,500 metres (31,200 ft), and the record seems to be some species of the genus Myriotrochus (in particular Myriotrochus bruuni), identified down to 10,687 metres (35,062 ft) deep. In more shallow waters, sea cucumbers can form dense populations. The strawberry sea cucumber (Squamocnus brevidentis) of New Zealand lives on rocky walls around the southern coast of the South Island where populations sometimes reach densities of 1,000 animals/m^{2} (93 animals/sq ft). For this reason, one such area in Fiordland is called the strawberry fields.

=== Locomotion ===
Some abyssal species in the abyssal order Elasipodida have evolved to a "benthopelagic" behaviour: their body is nearly the same density as the water around them, so they can make long jumps (up to 1,000 metres or 3,300 feet high), before falling slowly back to the ocean floor. Most of them have specific swimming appendages, such as some kind of umbrella (like Enypniastes), or a long lobe on top of the body (Psychropotes). Only one species is known as a true completely pelagic species, that never comes close to the bottom: Pelagothuria natatrix.

=== Diet ===
Holothuroidea are generally scavengers, feeding on debris in the benthic zone of the ocean. Exceptions include some pelagic cucumbers and the species Rynkatorpa pawsoni, which has a commensal relationship with deep-sea anglerfish. The diet of most cucumbers consists of plankton and decaying organic matter found in the sea. Some sea cucumbers position themselves in currents and catch food that flows by with their open tentacles. They also sift through the bottom sediments using their tentacles. Other species can dig into bottom silt or sand until they are completely buried. They then extrude their feeding tentacles, ready to withdraw at any hint of danger.

In the South Pacific, sea cucumbers may be found in densities of 40 individuals/m^{2} (3.7 individuals/sq ft). These populations can process 19 kilograms per square metre (3.9 lb/sq ft) of sediment per year.

The shape of the tentacles is generally adapted to the diet, and to the size of the particles to be ingested: the filter-feeding species mostly have complex arborescent tentacles, intended to maximize the surface area available for filtering, while the species feeding on the substratum will more often need digitate tentacles to sort out the nutritional material; the detritivore species living on fine sand or mud more often need shorter "peltate" tentacles, shaped like shovels. A single specimen can swallow more than 45 kilograms (99 lb) of sediment a year, and their excellent digestive capacities allow them to reject a finer, purer and homogeneous sediment. Therefore, sea cucumbers play a major role in the biological processing of the sea bed (bioturbation, purge, homogenization of the substratum etc.).

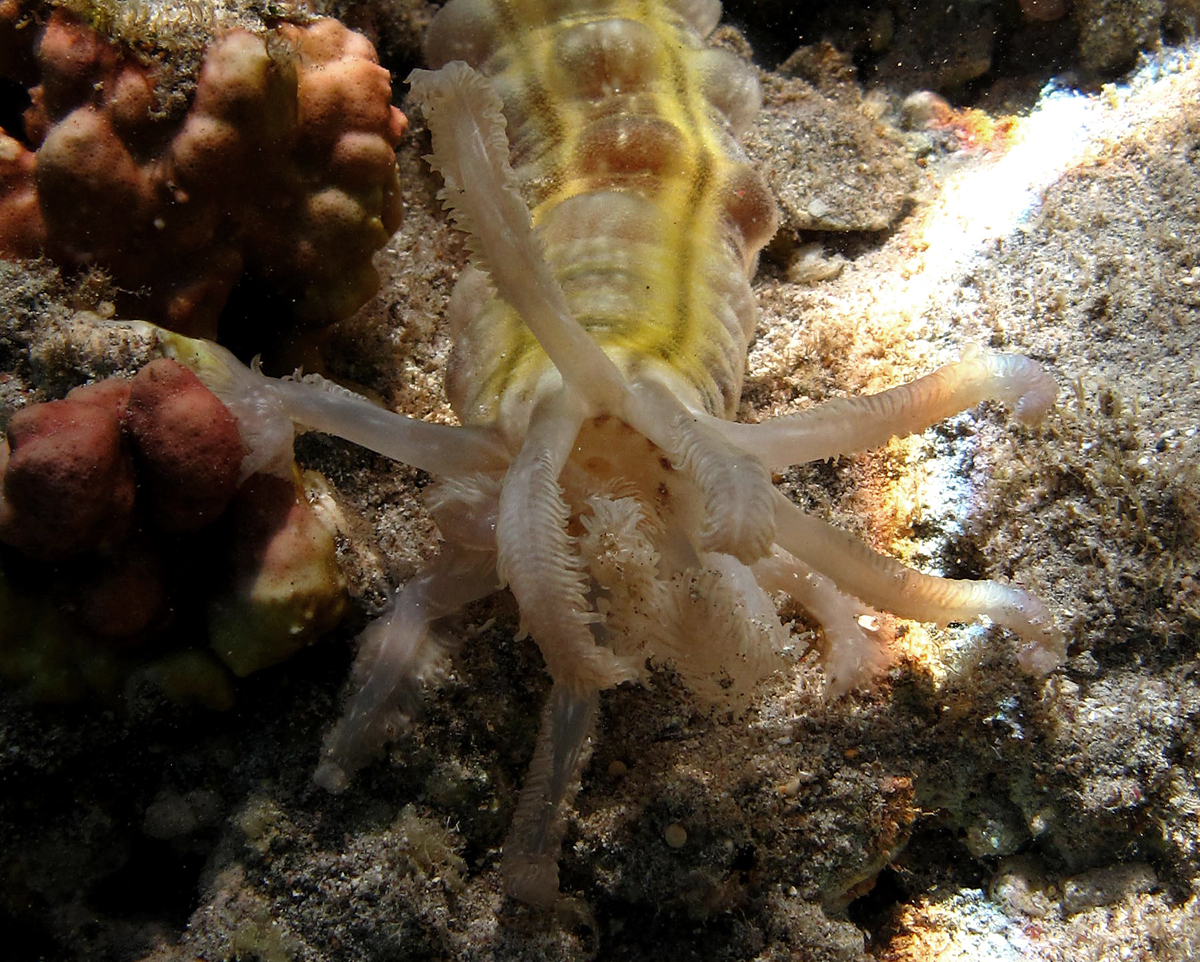
The mouth of Euapta godeffroyi, showing pinnate tentacles.

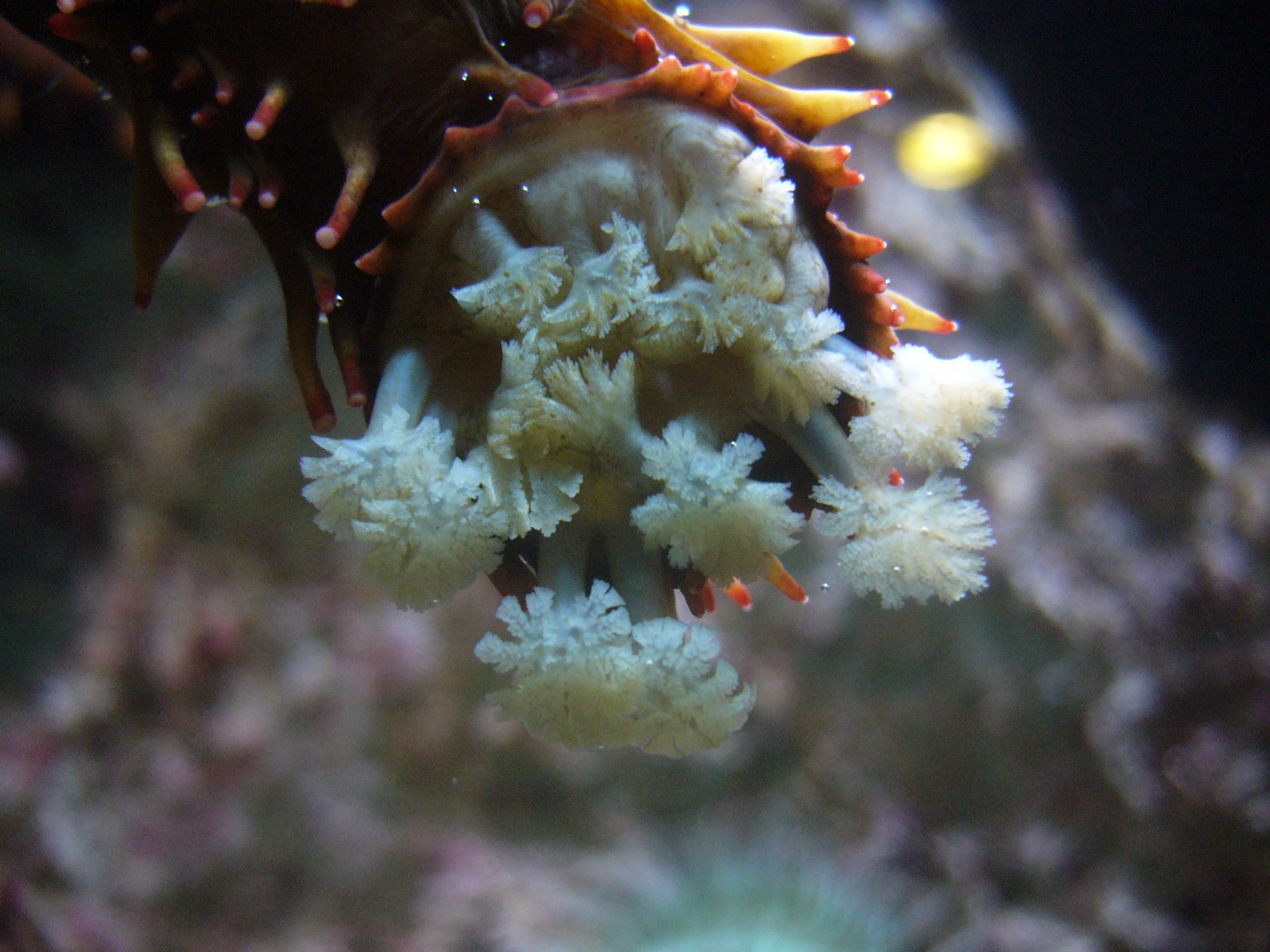
Mouth of Apostichopus californicus, showing peltate tentacles.

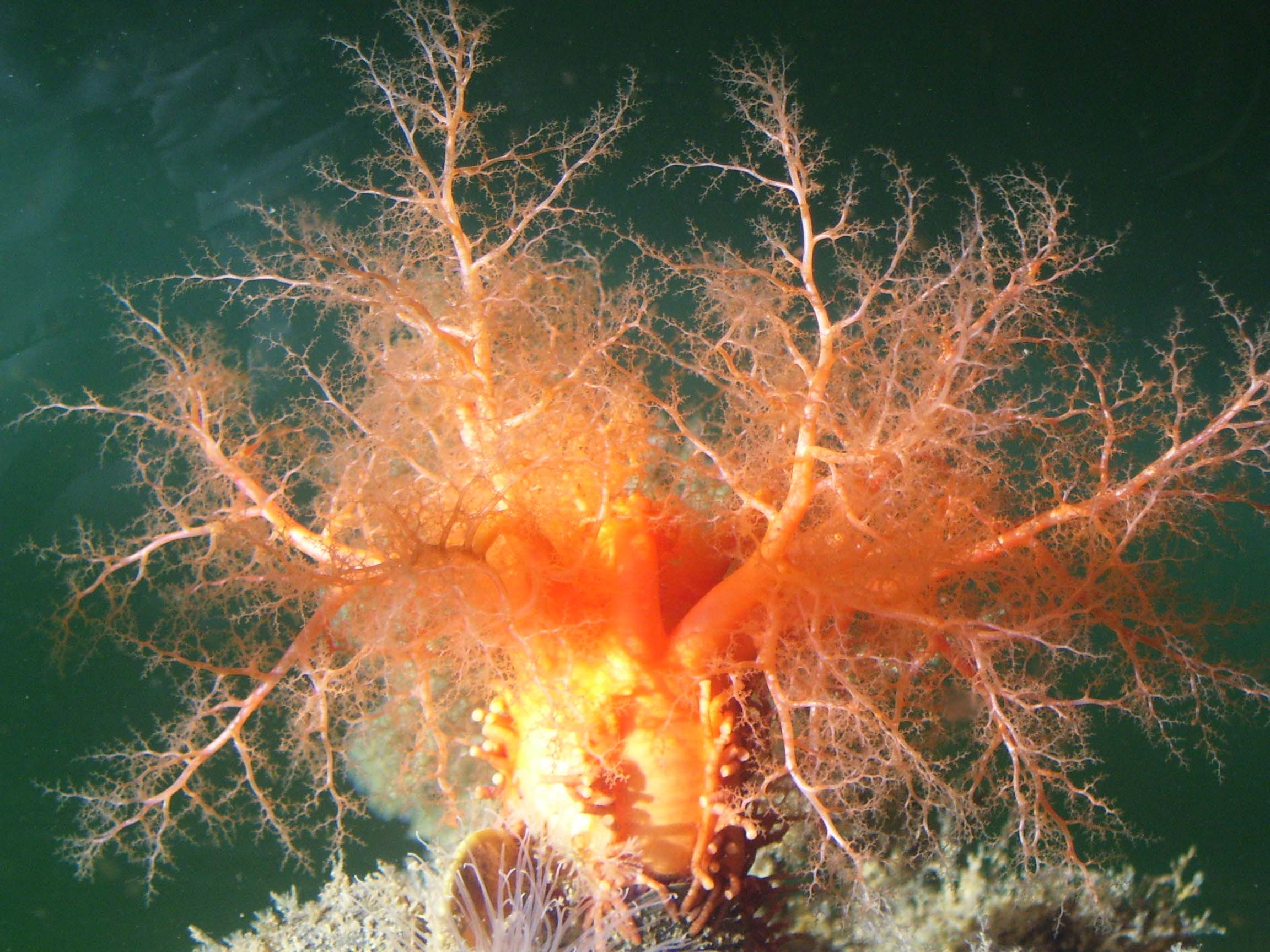
Mouth of Cucumaria miniata, with dendritic tentacles, for filtering the water.

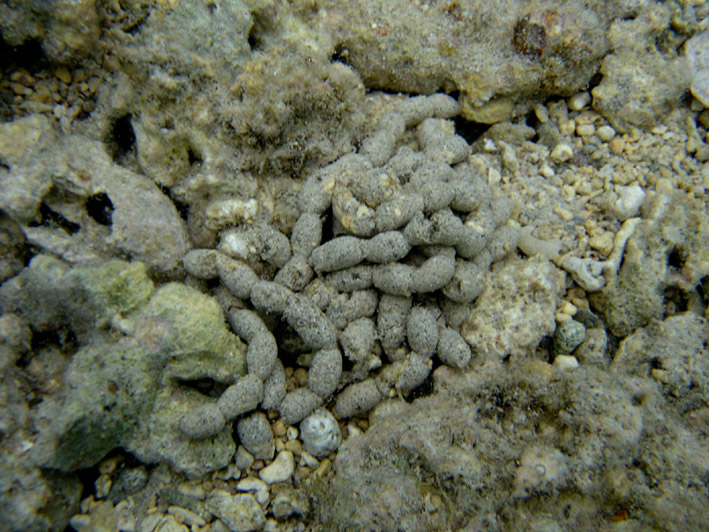
Faeces of a holothuroid. This participates in sediment homogenization and purification.

=== Reproduction ===
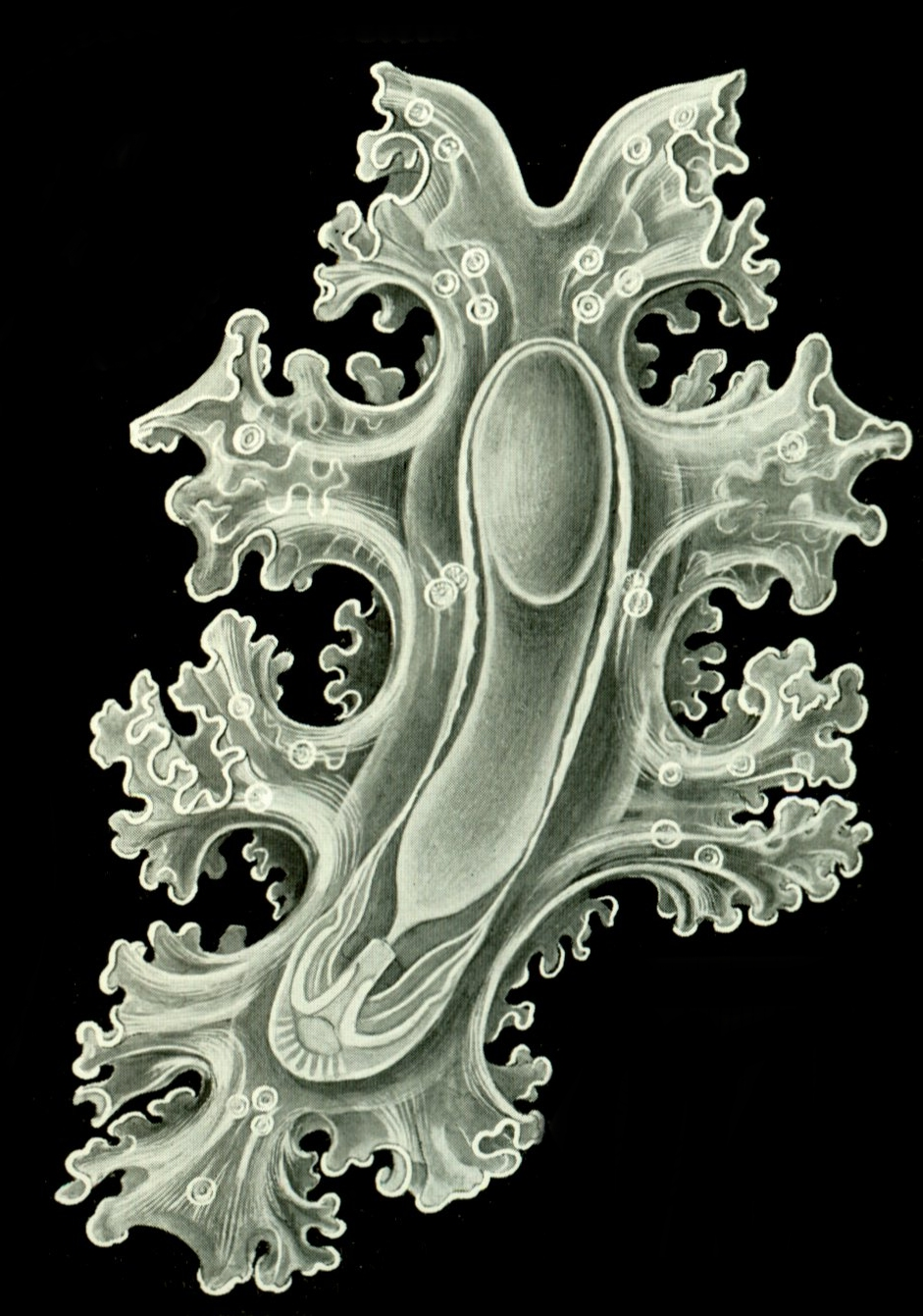
Auricularia larval stage (by Ernst Haeckel)

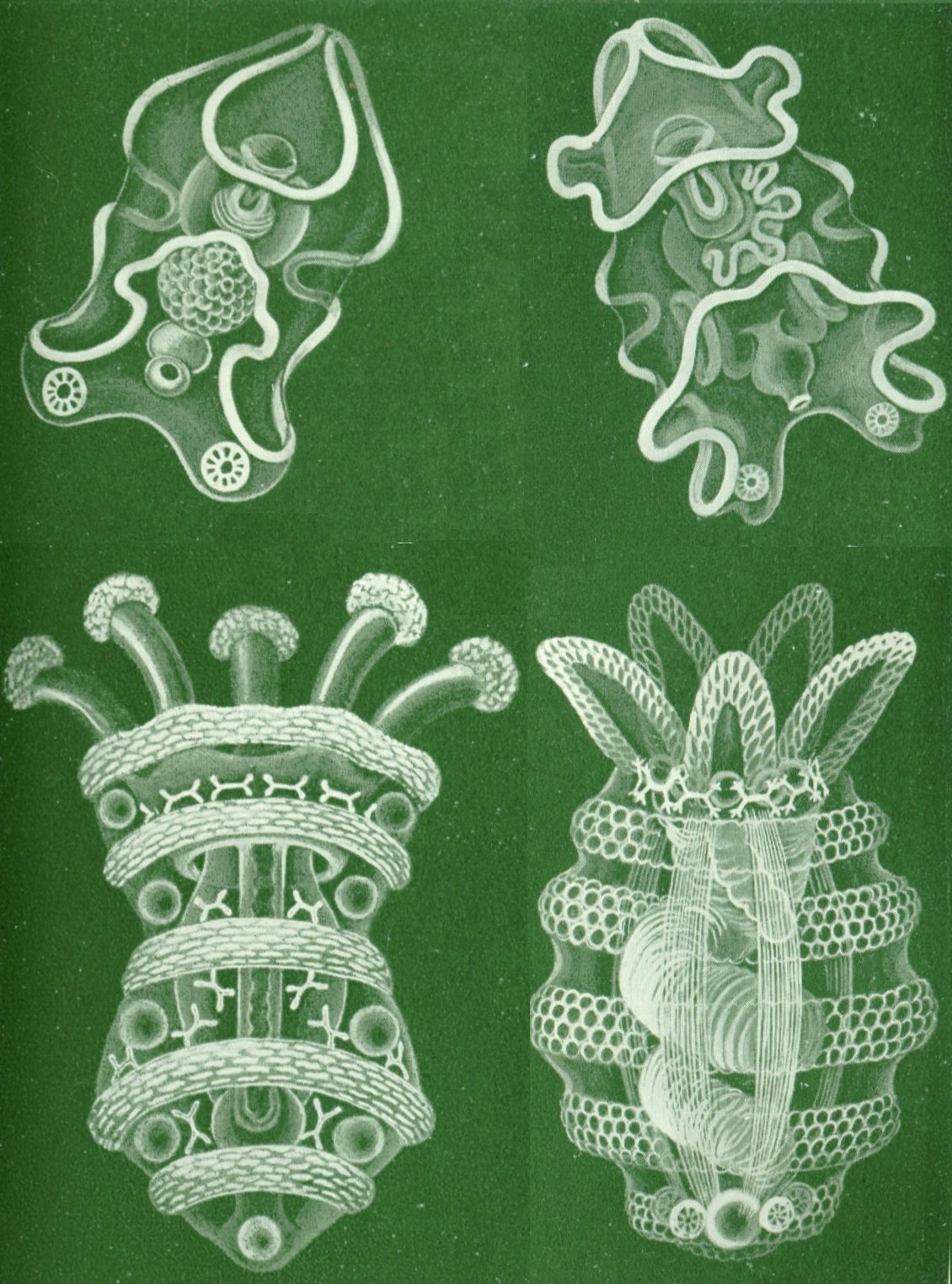
3 larval stages by Ernst Haeckel
top: Auricularia,
bottom left: Pentacularia, bottom right: Doliolaria

Most sea cucumbers reproduce by releasing sperm and ova into the ocean water. Depending on conditions, one organism can produce thousands of gametes. Sea cucumbers are typically dioecious, with separate male and female individuals, but some species are protandric. The reproductive system consists of a single gonad, consisting of a cluster of tubules emptying into a single duct that opens on the upper surface of the animal, close to the tentacles.

At least 30 species, including the red-chested sea cucumber (Pseudocnella insolens), fertilize their eggs internally and then pick up the fertilized zygote with one of their feeding tentacles. The egg is then inserted into a pouch on the adult's body, where it develops and eventually hatches from the pouch as a juvenile sea cucumber. A few species are known to brood their young inside the body cavity, giving birth through a small rupture in the body wall close to the anus.

=== Development ===
In all other species, the egg develops into a free-swimming larva, typically after around three days of development. The first stage of larval development is known as an auricularia, and is only around 1 mm (39 mils) in length. This larva swims by means of a long band of cilia wrapped around its body, and somewhat resembles the bipinnaria larva of starfish. As the larva grows it transforms into the doliolaria, with a barrel-shaped body and three to five separate rings of cilia. The pentacularia is the third larval stage of sea cucumber, where the tentacles appear. The tentacles are usually the first adult features to appear, before the regular tube feet.

=== Symbiosis and commensalism ===
Numerous small animals can live in symbiosis or commensalism with sea cucumbers, as well as some parasites.

Some cleaner shrimps can live on the tegument of holothuroids, in particular several species of the genus Periclimenes (genus which is specialized in echinoderms), in particular Periclimenes imperator. A variety of fish, most commonly pearl fish, have evolved a commensalistic symbiotic relationship with sea cucumbers in which the pearl fish will live in sea cucumber's cloaca using it for protection from predation, a source of food (the nutrients passing in and out of the anus from the water), and to develop into their adult stage of life. Many polychaete worms (family Polynoidae) and crabs (like Lissocarcinus orbicularis) have also specialized to use the mouth or the cloacal respiratory trees for protection by living inside the sea cucumber. Nevertheless, holothuroids species of the genus Actinopyga have anal teeth that prevent visitors from penetrating their anus.

Sea cucumbers can also shelter bivalves as endocommensals, such as Entovalva sp.

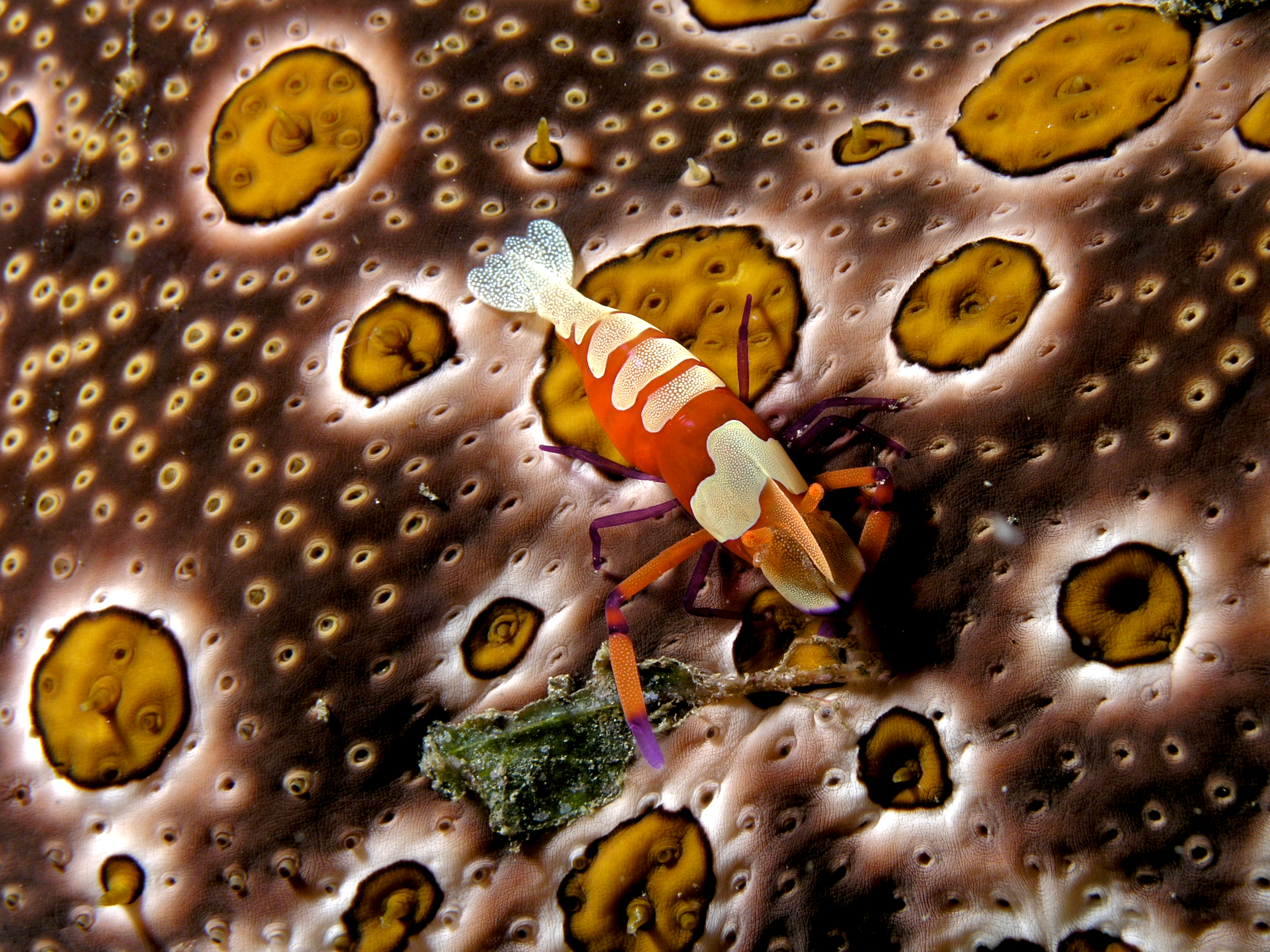
Emperor shrimp (Periclimenes imperator) on a Bohadschia ocellata

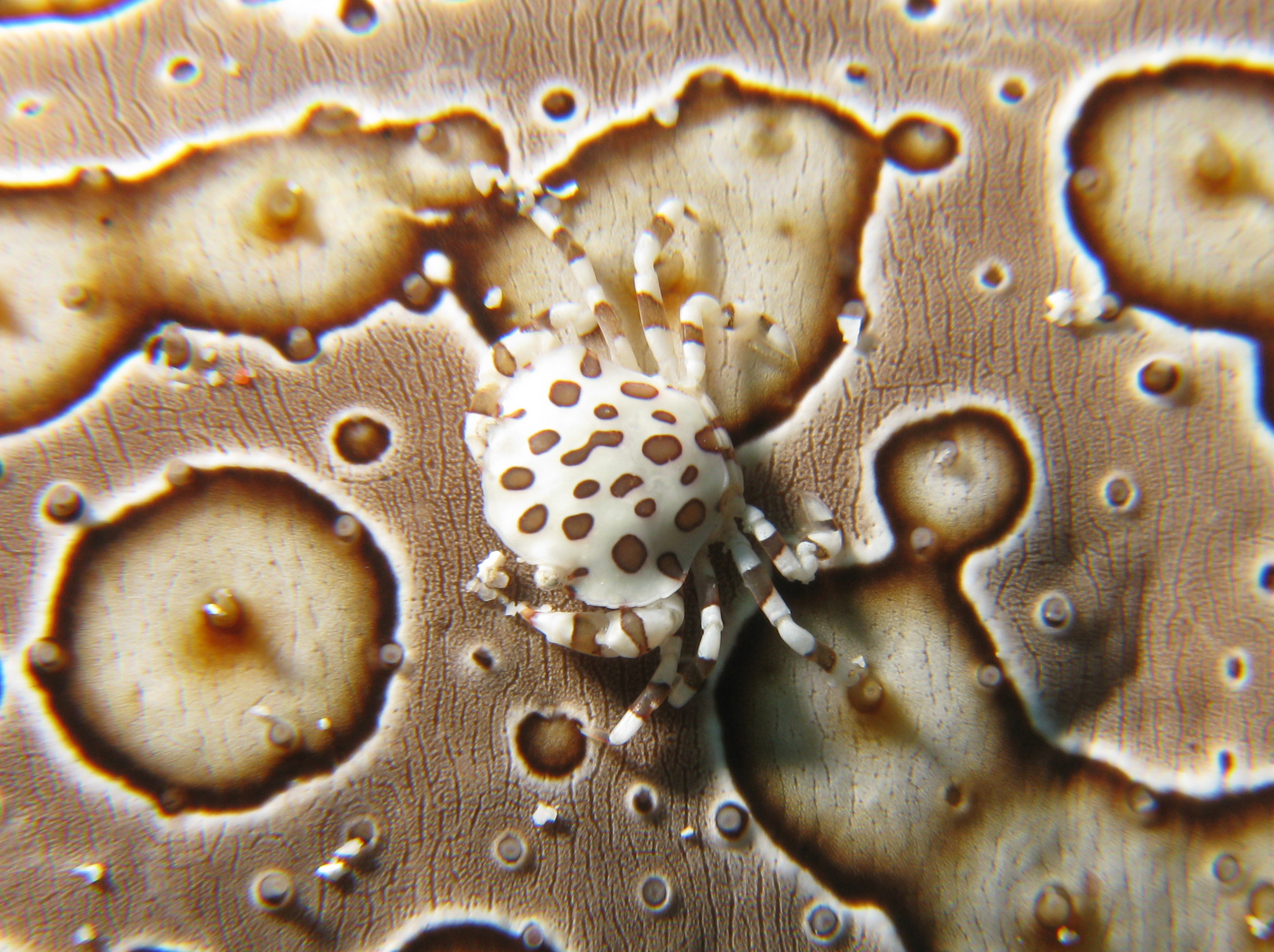
Sea cucumber crab (Lissocarcinus orbicularis), on a Bohadschia argus

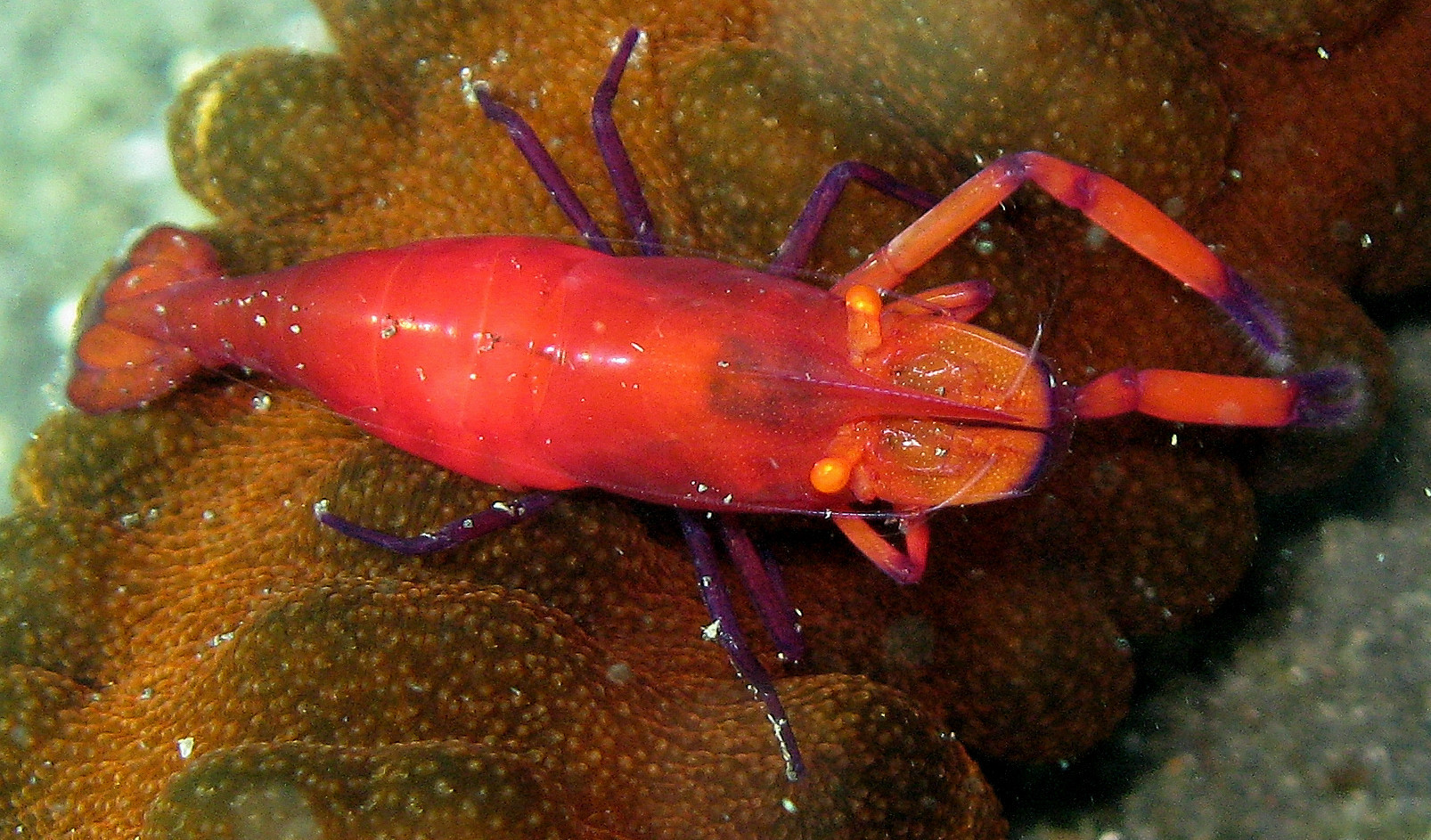
Periclimenes imperator, a symbiotic shrimp

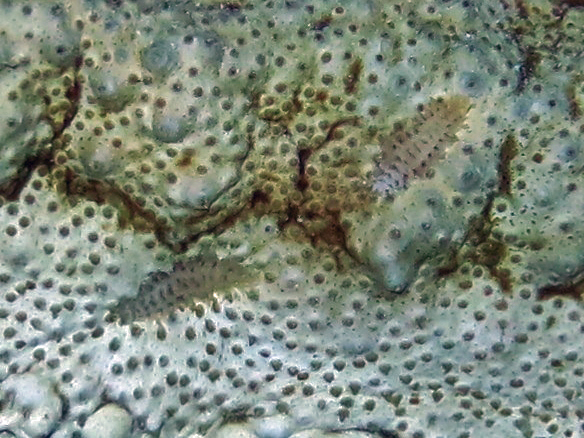
Two polynoid worms on a Thelenota anax

=== Predators and defensive systems ===
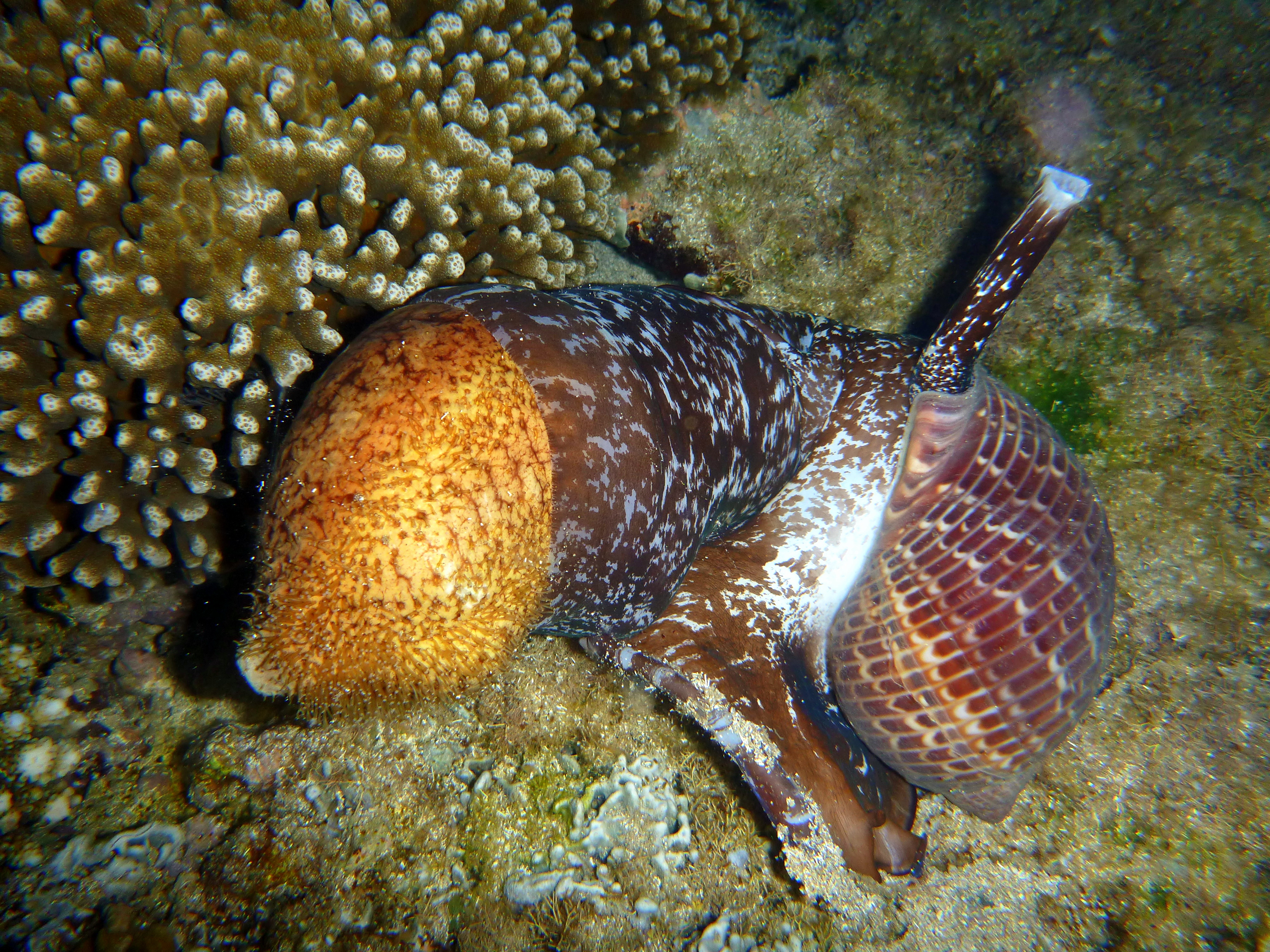
Tonna perdix, a selective predator of tropical sea cucumbers

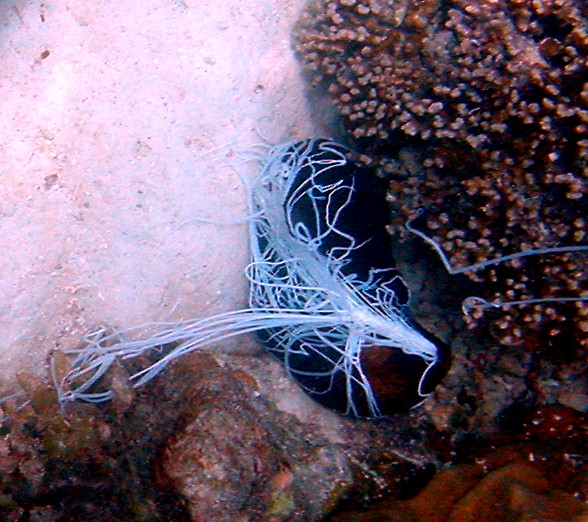
A sea cucumber in Mahé, Seychelles ejects sticky filaments from the anus in self-defense.

Sea cucumbers are often ignored by most of the marine predators because of the toxins they contain (in particular, holothurin) and because of their often spectacular defensive systems. However, they remain a prey for some highly specialized predators which are not affected by their toxins, such as the big mollusks Tonna galea and Tonna perdix, which paralyzes them using powerful poison before swallowing them completely. Some other less specialized and opportunist predators can also prey on sea cucumbers sometimes when they cannot find any better food, such as certain species of fish (triggerfish, pufferfish) and crustaceans (crabs, lobsters, hermit crabs).

Some species of coral-reef sea cucumbers within the order Aspidochirotida can defend themselves by expelling their sticky cuvierian tubules (enlargements of the respiratory tree that float freely in the coelom) to entangle potential predators. When startled, these cucumbers may expel some of them through a tear in the wall of the cloaca in an autotomic process known as evisceration. Replacement tubules grow back in one and a half to five weeks, depending on the species. The release of these tubules can also be accompanied by the discharge of a toxic chemical known as holothurin, which has similar properties to soap. This chemical can kill animals in the vicinity and is one more method by which these sedentary animals can defend themselves.

=== Estivation ===
If the water temperature becomes too high, some species of sea cucumber from temperate seas can aestivate. While they are in this state of dormancy, they stop feeding, their gut atrophies, their metabolism slows down and they lose weight. The body returns to its normal state when conditions improve.

== Classification ==
=== External relationships ===
Holothuroidea (sea cucumbers) are one of five extant classes that make up the phylum Echinodermata. This is one of the most distinctive and diverse phyla, ranging from starfish to urchins to sea cucumbers and many other organisms. The echinoderms are mainly distinguished from other phyla by their body plan and organization. The extant echinoderms consist of the Crinoidea and the Eleutherozoa, the latter of which is divided into the Asterozoa and the Echinozoa. Holothuroidea is part of the subphylum Echinozoa along with the extant Echinoidea (sea urchins, sand dollars, etc.) and extinct Ophiocistioidea. The ophiocistioids likely form a paraphyletic grade from which holothuroids evolved. The earliest sea cucumbers are known from the middle Ordovician, over 450 million years ago.

- Echinodermata c. 500 mya
  - Crinoidea
  - Eleutherozoa
    - Echinozoa
      - Holothuroidea c. 450 mya
      - Echinoidea
    - Asterozoa
      - Ophiuroidea
      - Asteroidea

==== Homologies with other echinoderm classes ====
All echinoderms share three main characteristics. When mature, echinoderms have a pentamerous radial symmetry. While this can easily be seen in a sea star or brittle star, in the sea cucumber it is less distinct and seen in their five primary tentacles. The pentamerous radial symmetry can also be seen in their five ambulacral canals. The ambulacral canals are used in their water vascular system which is another characteristic that binds this phylum together.

The water vascular system develops from their middle coelom or hydrocoel. Echinoderms use this system for many things including movement by pushing water in and out of their podia or "tube feet". Echinoderms tube feet (including sea cucumbers) can be seen aligned along the side of their axes.

While echinoderms are invertebrates, meaning they do not have a spine, they do all have an endoskeleton that is secreted by the mesenchyme. This endoskeleton is composed of plates called ossicles. They are always internal but may only be covered by a thin epidermal layer like in sea urchin's spines. In the sea cucumber, the ossicles are only found in the dermis, making them a very supple organism. For most echinoderms, their ossicles are found in units making up a three dimensional structure. However, in sea cucumbers, the ossicles are found in a two-dimensional network.

All echinoderms also possess anatomical feature(s) called mutable collagenous tissues, or MCTs. Such tissues can rapidly change their passive mechanical properties from soft to stiff under the control of the nervous system and coordinated with muscle activity. Different echinoderm classes use MCTs in different ways. The asteroids, sea stars, can detach limbs for self-defense and then regenerate them. The Crinoidea, sea fans, can go from stiff to limp depending on the current for optimal filter feeding. The Echinoidea, sea urchins and sand dollars, use MCTs to grow and replace their rows of teeth when they need new ones. The Holothuroidea, sea cucumbers, use MCTs to eviscerate their gut as a self-defense response. MCTs can be used in many ways but are all similar at the cellular level and in mechanics of function. A common trend in the uses of MCTs is that they are generally used for self-defense mechanisms and in regeneration.

=== Internal relationships ===
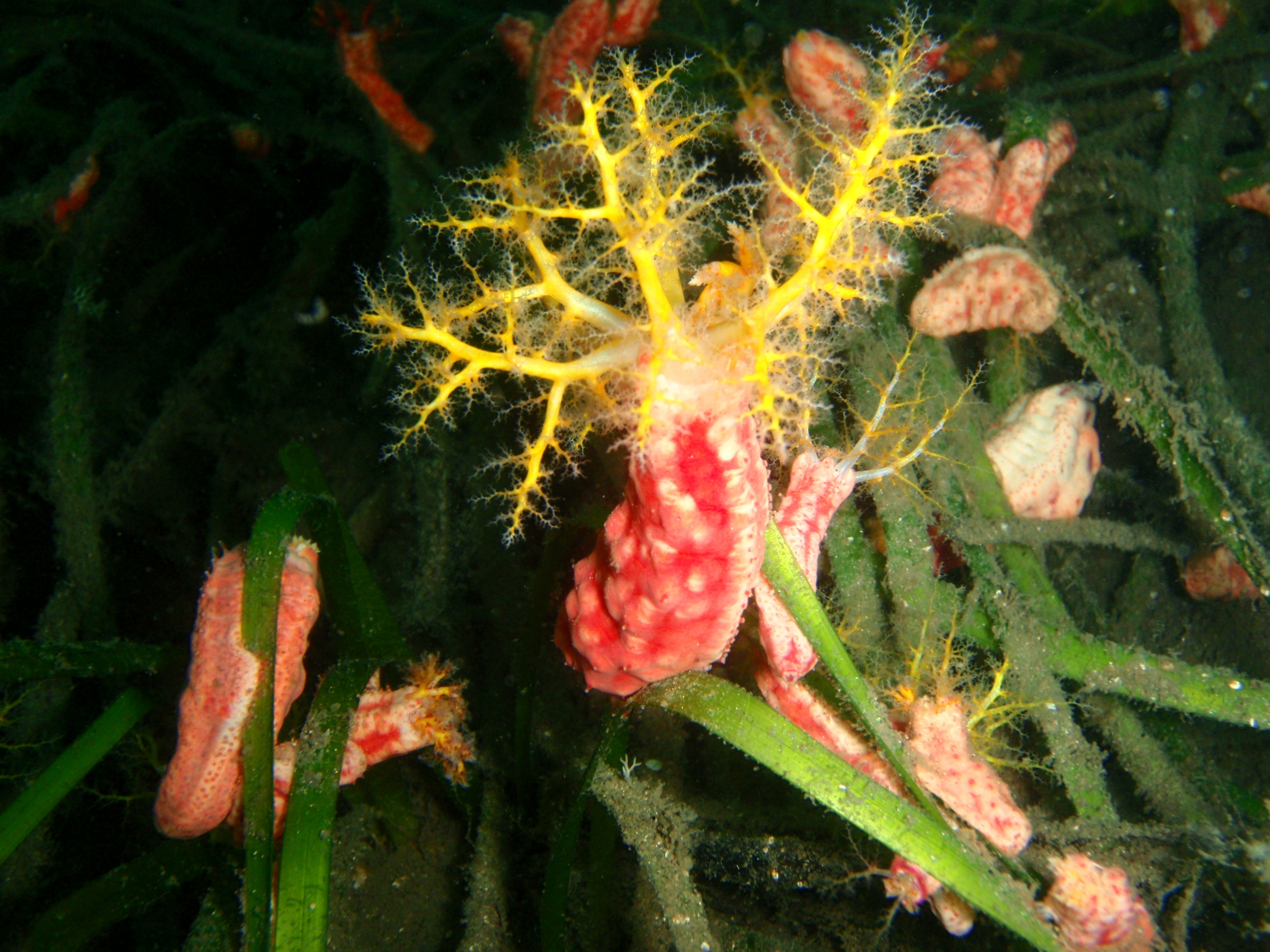
Dendrochirotida like this Cercodemas anceps are curled-bodied and have arborescent tentacles

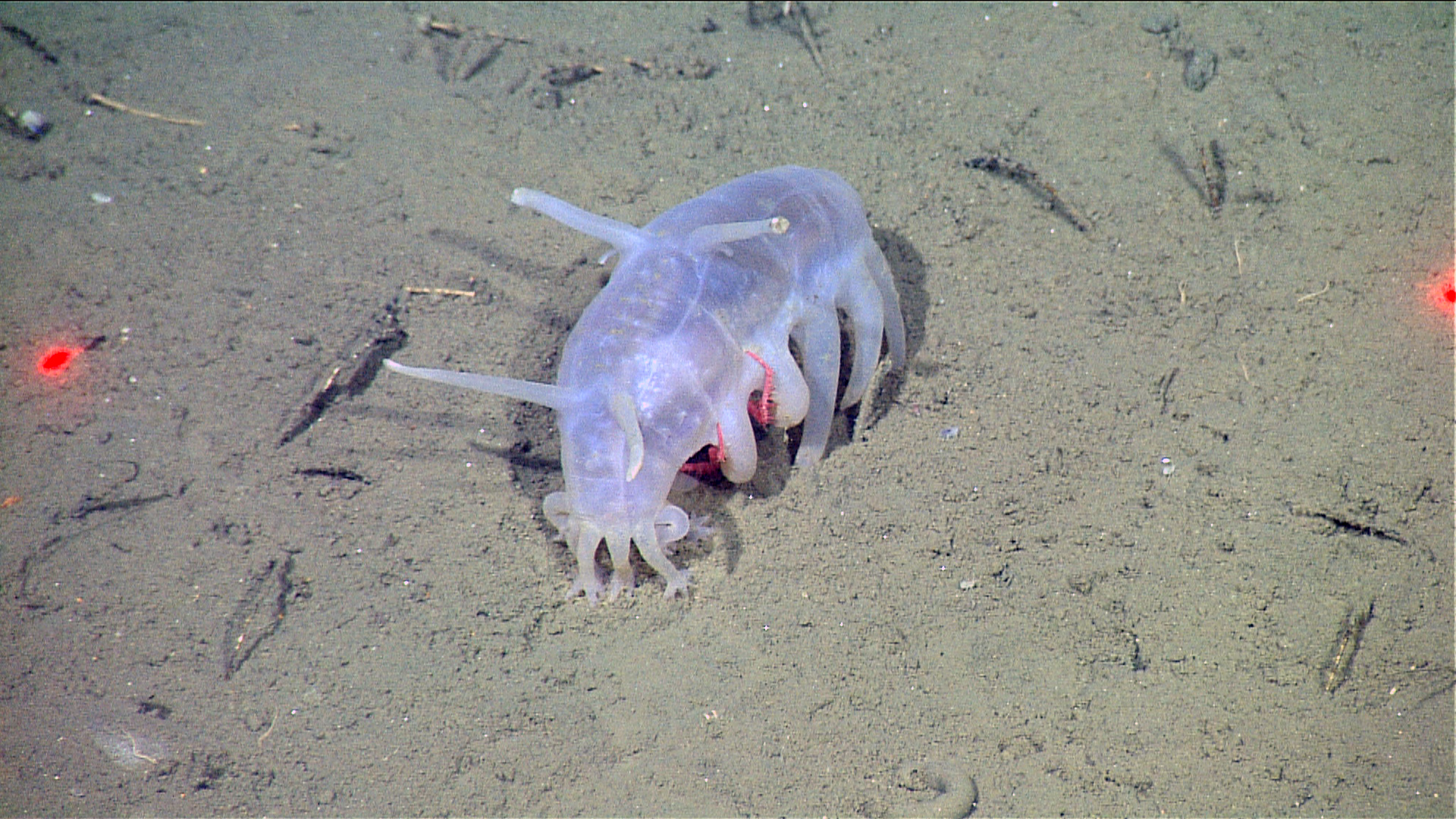
Elasipodida like this "sea pig" Scotoplanes have a translucent body with specific appendages; they live in the abyss

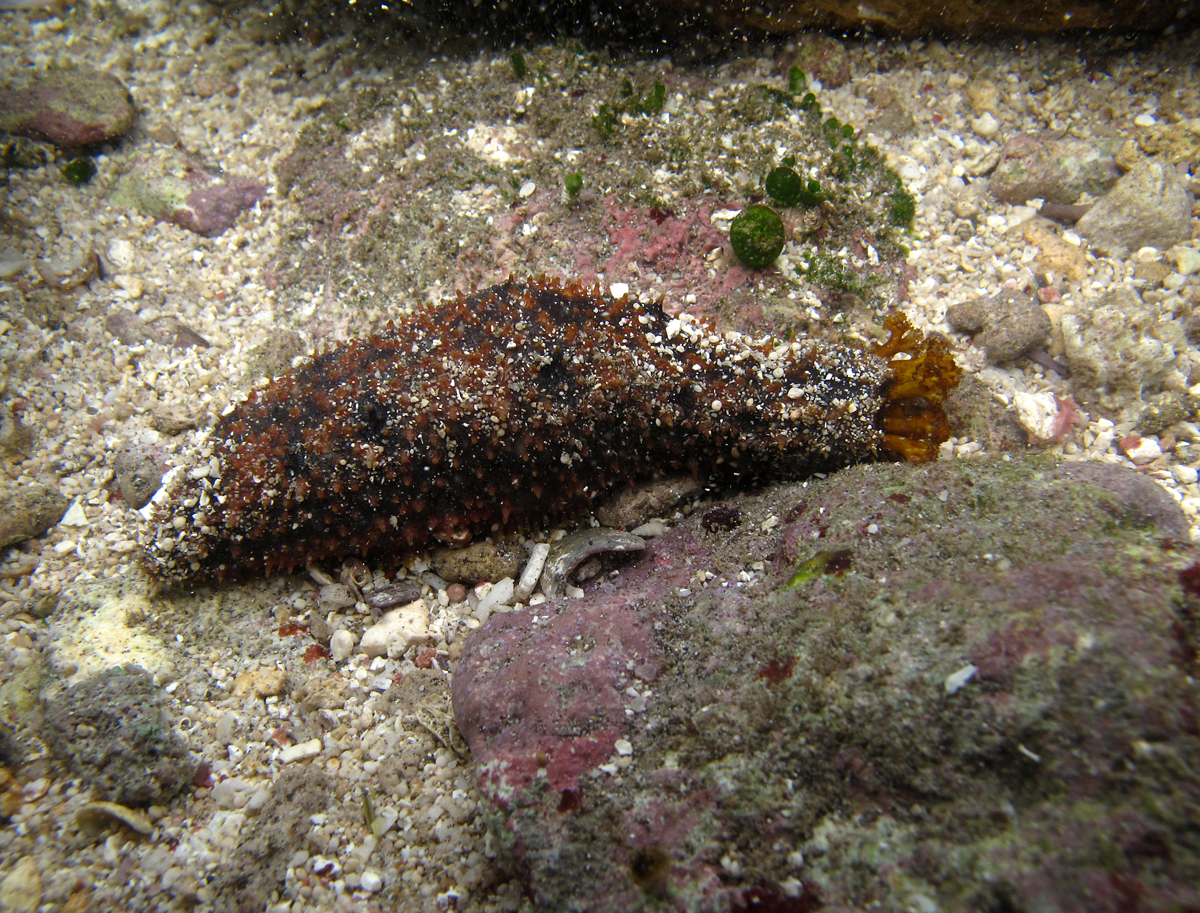
Holothuriida like this Holothuria cinerascens are sausage-shaped, with peltate tentacles

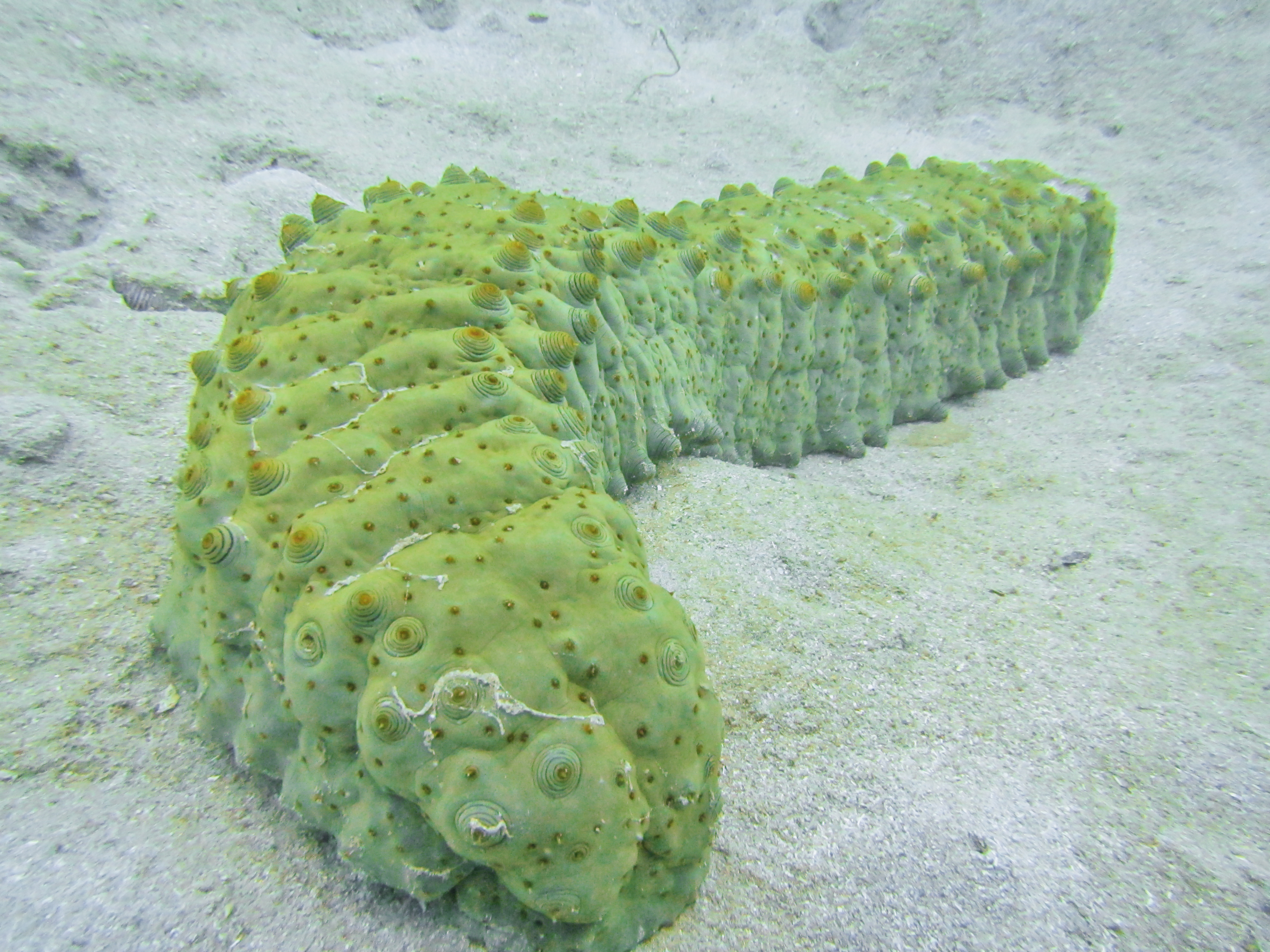
Synallactida like this Stichopus herrmanni still lack a definition

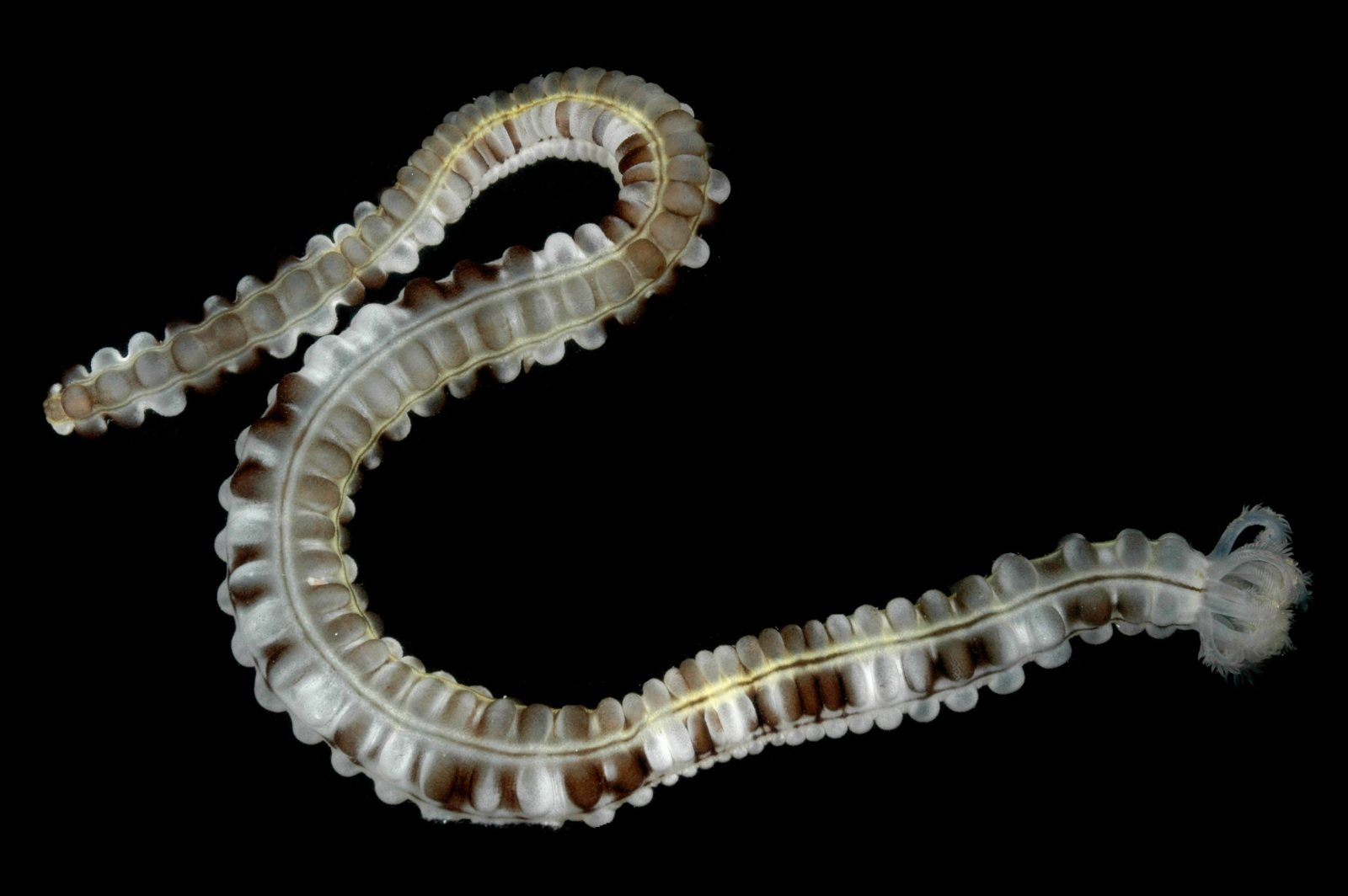
Apodida like this Euapta godeffroyi are snake-shaped, without podia, and have pinnate tentacles.

Holothuroid classification is complex and their paleontological phylogeny relies on a limited number of well-preserved specimens. The modern taxonomy is based first of all on the presence or the shape of certain soft parts (podia, lungs, tentacles, peripharingal crown) to determine the main orders, and secondarily on the microscopic examination of ossicles to determine the genus and the species. Contemporary genetic methods have been helpful in clarifying their classification.

Taxonomic classification according to World Register of Marine Species:

- subclass Actinopoda Ludwig, 1891
  - order Dendrochirotida Grube, 1840
    - family Cucumariidae Ludwig, 1894
    - family Cucumellidae Thandar & Arumugam, 2011
    - family Heterothyonidae Pawson, 1970
    - family †Monilipsolidae Smith & Gallemí, 1991
    - family Paracucumidae Pawson & Fell, 1965
    - family Phyllophoridae Östergren, 1907
    - family Placothuriidae Pawson & Fell, 1965
    - family Psolidae Burmeister, 1837
    - family Rhopalodinidae Théel, 1886
    - family Sclerodactylidae Panning, 1949
    - family Vaneyellidae Pawson & Fell, 1965
    - family Ypsilothuriidae Heding, 1942
  - order Elasipodida Théel, 1882
    - family Elpidiidae Théel, 1882
    - family Laetmogonidae Ekman, 1926
    - family †Palaeolaetmogonidae Reich, 2012
    - family Pelagothuriidae Ludwig, 1893
    - family Psychropotidae Théel, 1882
  - order Holothuriida Miller, Kerr, Paulay, Reich, Wilson, Carvajal & Rouse, 2017
    - family Holothuriidae Burmeister, 1837
    - family Mesothuriidae Smirnov, 2012
  - order Molpadida Haeckel, 1896
    - family Caudinidae Heding, 1931
    - family Eupyrgidae Semper, 1867
    - family Molpadiidae Müller, 1850
  - order Persiculida Miller, Kerr, Paulay, Reich, Wilson, Carvajal & Rouse, 2017
    - family Gephyrothuriidae Koehler & Vaney, 1905
    - family Molpadiodemidae Miller, Kerr, Paulay, Reich, Wilson, Carvajal & Rouse, 2017
    - family Pseudostichopodidae Miller, Kerr, Paulay, Reich, Wilson, Carvajal & Rouse, 2017
  - order Synallactida Miller, Kerr, Paulay, Reich, Wilson, Carvajal & Rouse, 2017
    - family Deimatidae Théel, 1882
    - family Stichopodidae Haeckel, 1896
    - family Synallactidae Ludwig, 1894
- subclass †ArthrochirotaceaSmirnov, 2012
  - order †Arthrochirotida Brandt, 1835
    - family †Palaeocucumariidae Frizzell & Exline, 1966
- subclass Paractinopoda Ludwig, 1891
  - order Apodida Brandt, 1835
    - family Chiridotidae Östergren, 1898
    - family Myriotrochidae Théel, 1877
    - family Synaptidae Burmeister, 1837

== Scientific history and naming ==
The word Holothurion (ὁloqoύrion or "holothoύrion") was coined by the Greek philosopher Aristotle in his Historia animalium (Book I, Part 1), although it remains unsure whether he is referring to the same animal as us.

The earliest known mention of the Greek term ὁλοθούριον (holotoúrion) · is found in the poet Epicharmus around 450 BC. Plato, Aristotle and Theophrastus all used the generic name πλεύμον θαλάσσιος (pleúmon thalássios) to refer to a soft, flabby marine zoophyte – often translated as "sea lung"; the term may designate sea cucumbers, but possibly also ascidians or even jellyfish.

One of the oldest scientific texts concerning sea cucumbers dates back to Aristotle, in his Parts of Animals (around 343 BC): he names an animal "holothurion" without describing it, but classifies it among the animals lacking sensation (along with sponges and "sea lungs", apparently corresponding to tunicates); this name would later be retained and used to refer to sea cucumbers, though there is no definitive proof that this was the animal the Philosopher meant.

Today, the word "Holothurian" is often used, although it is considered wrong as it would refer mostly to the genus Holothuria rather than to the whole class of Holothurioidea, which should rather be called in English "Holothuroids".

In the East, medical or zoological treatises mention sea cucumbers as early as the 8th century, notably the Kojiki (712) and Wamyō ruijushō (934) in Japan, initiating a long tradition of excellent representations of these animals in Japanese and Chinese treatises.

Western scientists began to take renewed interest in echinoderms during the Renaissance, and Pierre Belon in 1553 was the first to propose a link between them and starfish and sea urchins. The first unambiguous use of this term to name a sea cucumber, accompanied by an illustration, is found in the Libri de Piscibus Marinis by Guillaume Rondelet, published in 1554 (although he describes two species, the second being an ascidian, and he wrongly separates the "vit de mer"). He noted that these beings "are of a middle nature between plants and animals".

Real progress came during the Age of Enlightenment: in 1751, an article titled "Holothurie" was written for the Encyclopédie, based on the commentaries of Aristotle and Rondelet, but their taxonomic position (and even their description) remained unclear:

HOLOTHURIE, s.f. holothurium, (Nat. Hist. Zool.) marine animal. Mr. Linnæus placed it among the zoophytes, which are naked and have limbs. Rondelet mentioned two species of holothuries which he illustrated. The first species has a hard shell, it is oblong; one end is blunt and finished with a shell pierced with several holes. The second species has a body covered with spines; it ends at one end with a sort of round head pierced with a round, wrinkled hole that opens and closes, and which is the animal's mouth; the other end is narrow and elongated like a tail. On each side is an extension which is a leg, or rather a fin, since the animal uses it to move. One of the extensions is narrower than the other, scalloped all around, and pointed.

In 1758, sea cucumbers appeared in the Systema Naturae of Carl von Linné, but the term still did not refer specifically to echinoderms, and included diverse creatures such as the physalia. It was only in 1767 that Linnaeus revised the Holothuria entry.

Nathanael Gottfried Leske created the phylum echinoderms in 1778 (systematized by Jean-Guillaume Bruguière in 1791), thereby formally incorporating this clade into scientific classifications. Henri-Marie Ducrotay de Blainville provided the scientific description of the subclass Holothuroidea in 1834, identifying it specifically with sea cucumbers (then still grouped under a single genus).

During the 19th century, many species were discovered (notably by Edmond Perrier), and were rapidly divided into orders and families, particularly by Grube, Théel, and Haeckel.

In the 20th century, increasingly intensive commercial fishing driven by Asian markets led to the rapid collapse of numerous stocks. This situation began to alarm the industry and governments from the 1970s onward, prompting scientific studies on population status, which helped revive interest in sea cucumber research. In 1990, the SPC Beche-de-mer Information Bulletin was launched, the first scientific journal devoted exclusively to holothuroids. Today, sea cucumbers are studied by numerous specialists from around the world, including Chantal Conand, Gustav Paulay, Sven Uthicke, Nyawira Muthiga, Maria Byrne, Steven Purcell, François Michonneau, and Yves Samyn.

== Relation to humans ==
=== Food ===
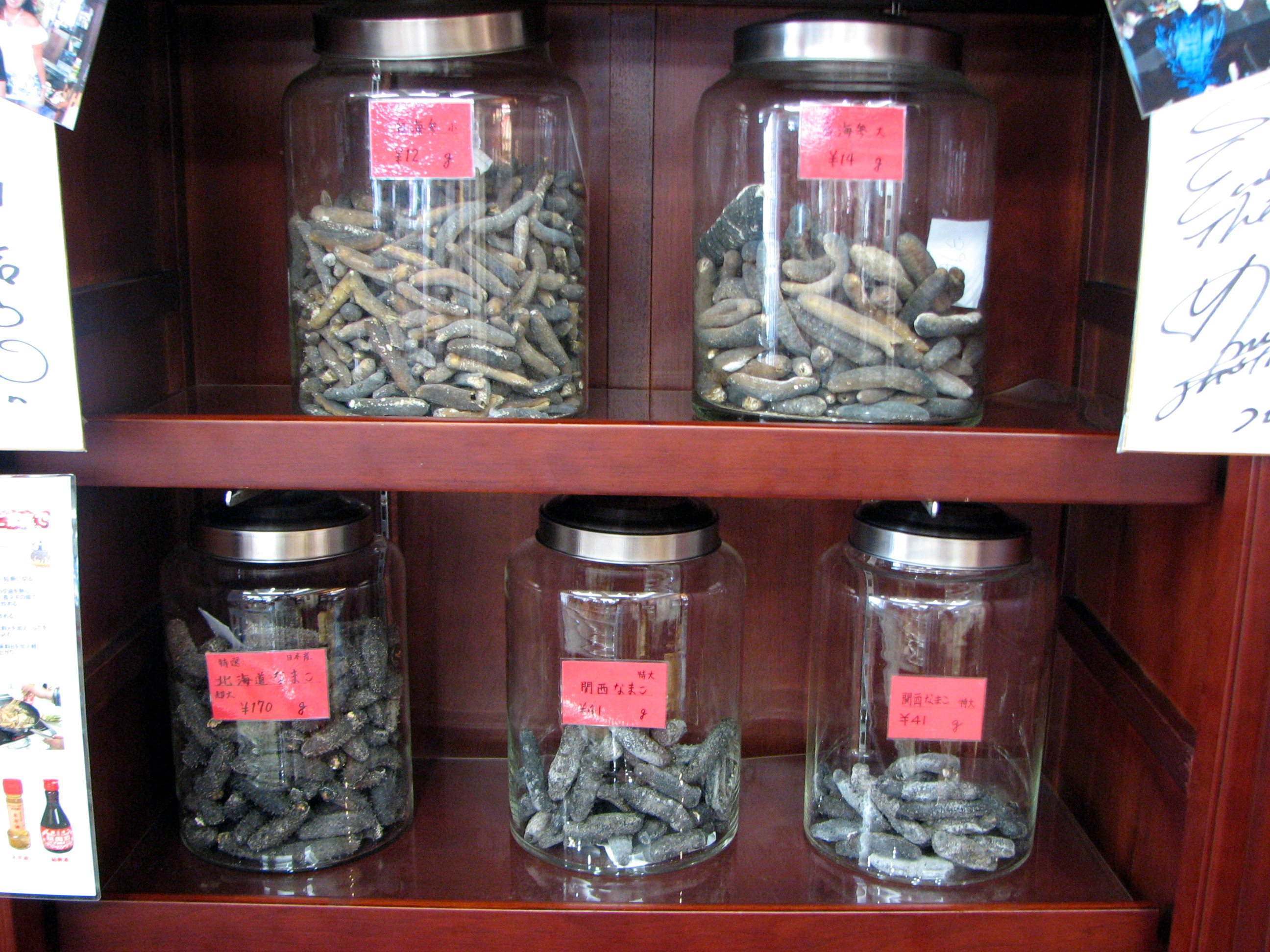
Dried sea cucumbers in a Japanese pharmacy

Sea cucumbers are consumed in various Asian countries such as China, Indonesia, Japan, South Korea, and Malaysia. They are commonly eaten as winter delicacies in the Noto Peninsula of Japan, with local harvest reportedly dating back to the 8th century.

Sea cucumbers have also been harvested for local consumption in some Pacific Island countries like Palau, Samoa, Tonga, Fiji and the Federated States of Micronesia.

To supply the markets of Southern China, Makassar trepangers traded with the Indigenous Australians of Arnhem Land from at least the 18th century and probably earlier. This is the first recorded example of trade between the inhabitants of the Australian continent and their Asian neighbours.

There are many commercially important species of sea cucumber that are harvested and dried for export to the Asian market, often to be used in Chinese cuisine as hoisam. Some of the more commonly found species in markets include:

- Acaudina molpadioides
- Actinopyga echinites
- Actinopyga mauritiana
- Actinopyga palauensis
- Apostichopus californicus
- Apostichopus japonicus
- Holothuria nobilis
- Holothuria scabra
- Holothuria fuscogilva
- Isostichopus fuscus
- Thelenota ananas

=== Medicine ===
According to the American Cancer Society, although it has been used in traditional Asian folk medicine for a variety of ailments, "there is little reliable scientific evidence to support claims that sea cucumber is effective in treating cancer, arthritis, and other diseases" but research is examining "whether some compounds made by sea cucumbers may be helpful against cancer".

Various pharmaceutical companies emphasize gamat, the Malay traditional medicinal usage of this animal. Extracts are prepared and made into oil, cream or cosmetics. Some products are intended to be taken internally.

A review article found that chondroitin sulfate and related compounds found in sea cucumbers can help in treating joint-pain, and that dried sea cucumber is "medicinally effective in suppressing arthralgia".

Another study suggested that sea cucumbers contain all the fatty acids necessary to play a potentially active role in tissue repair. Sea cucumbers are under investigation for use in treating ailments including colorectal cancer. Surgical probes made of nanocomposite material based on the sea cucumber have been shown to reduce brain scarring. One study found that a lectin from Cucumaria echinata impaired the development of the malaria parasite when produced by transgenic mosquitoes.

Published research reports that explanted tissue from the sea cucumber healed and continued to grow in non-sterile seawater without supplementation for more than three years. The explants displayed immune activity, cell cycling, tissue reorganization, and absorption of dissolved amino acids, indicating ongoing biological activity. The authors state that these findings "challenge conventional perceptions of tissue immortality" and have "substantial implications for regenerative biology, biomedical research, and tissue engineering"

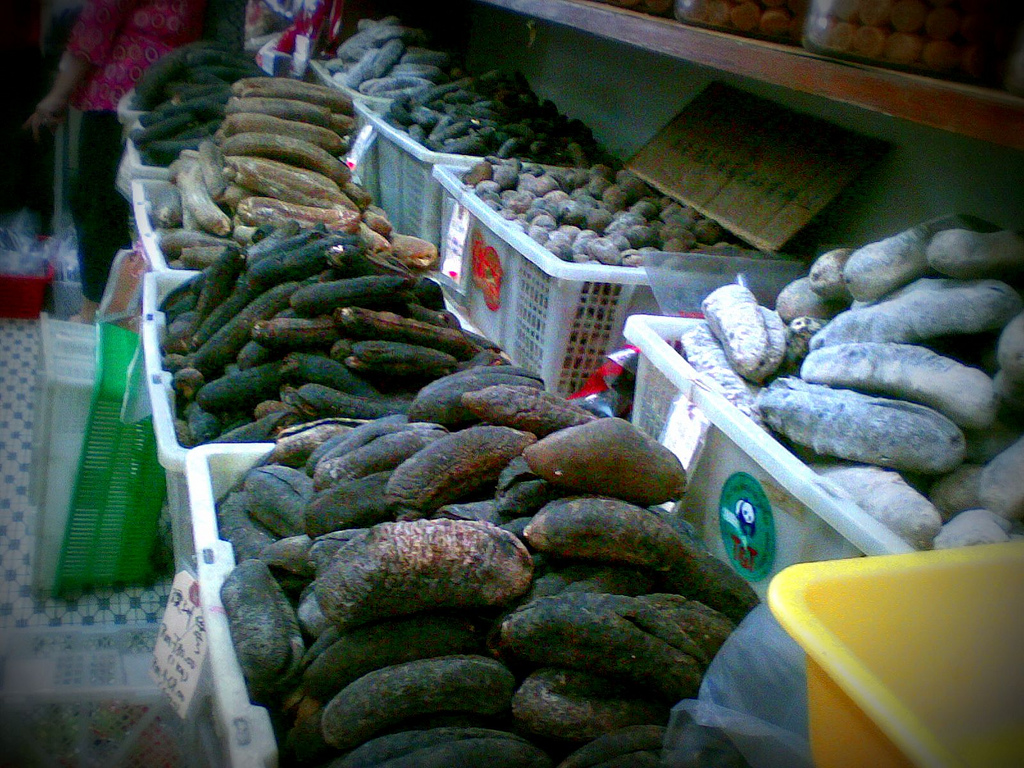
"Teripang" in a market in Asia.

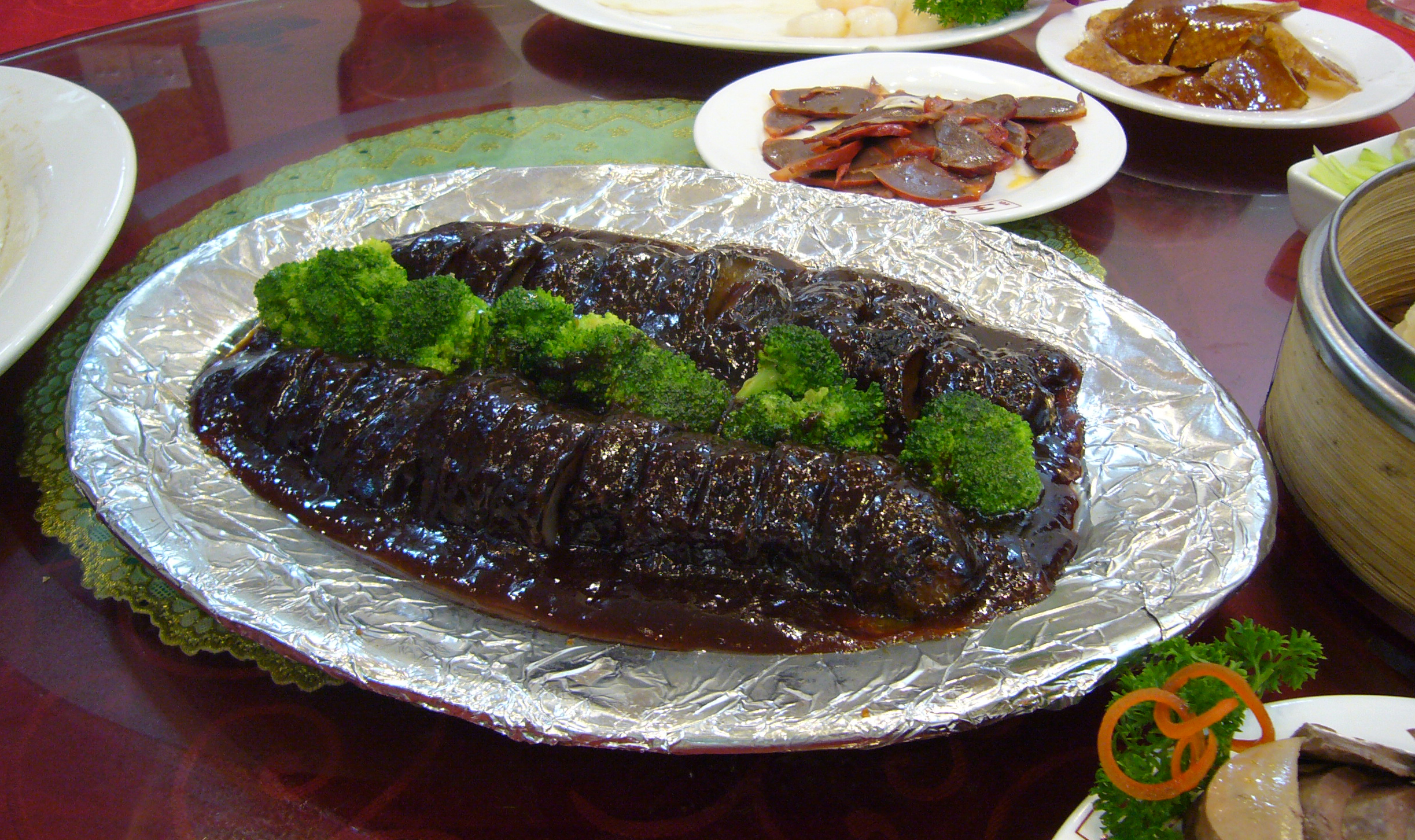
Sea cucumber in sauce in China.

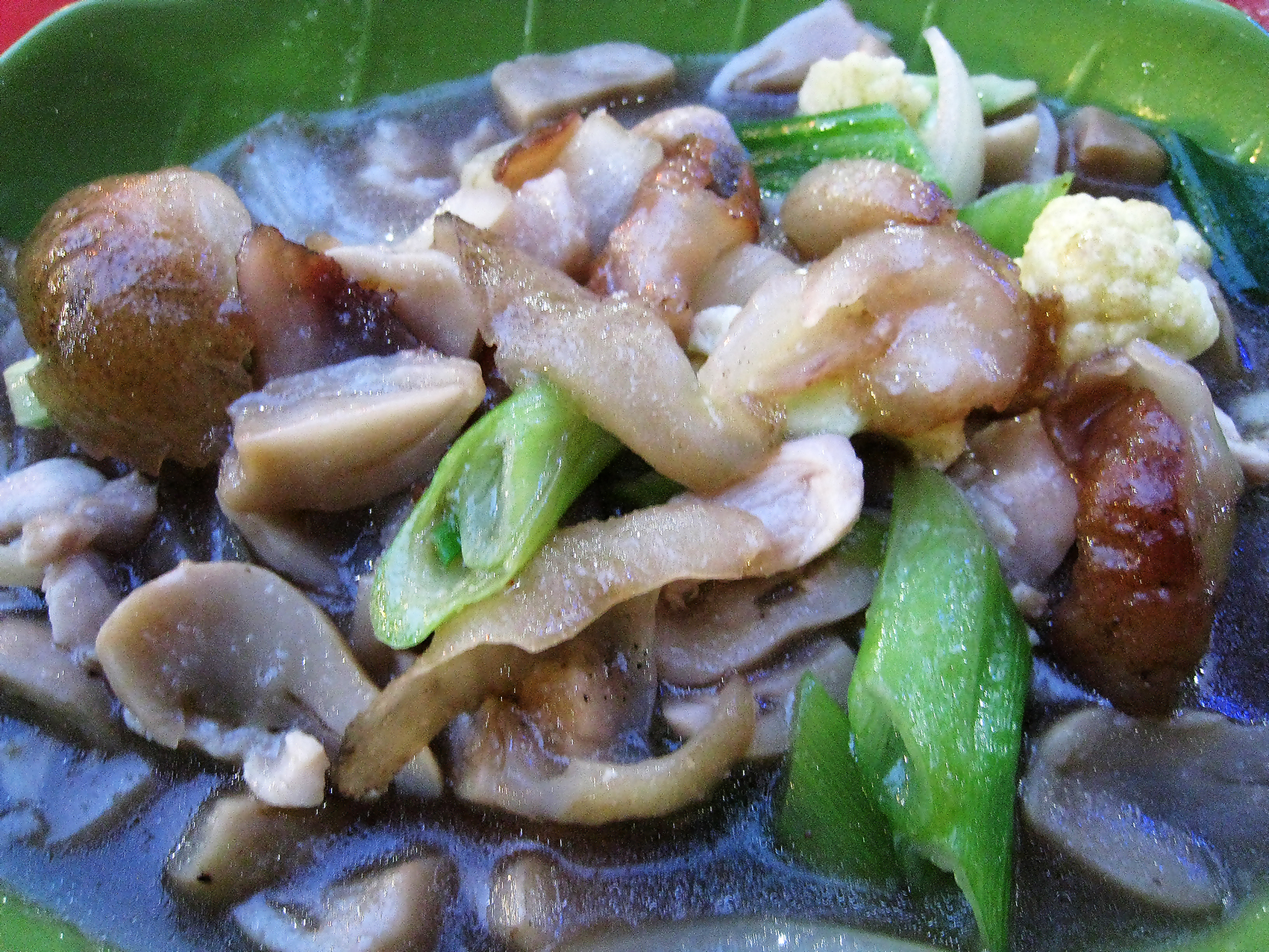
Haisom cah jamur, Chinese Indonesian sea cucumber with mushroom.

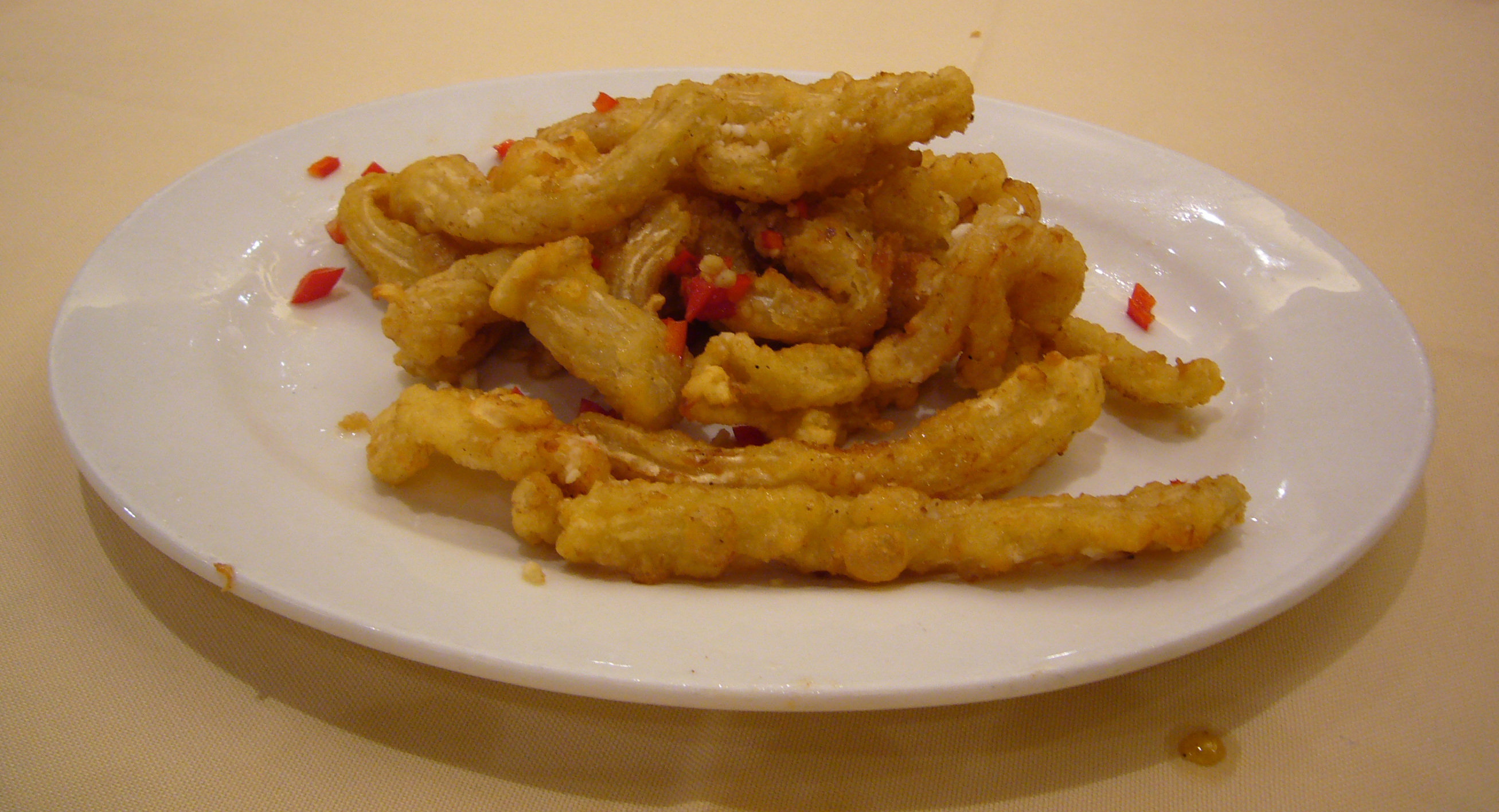
Deep fried sea cucumbers.

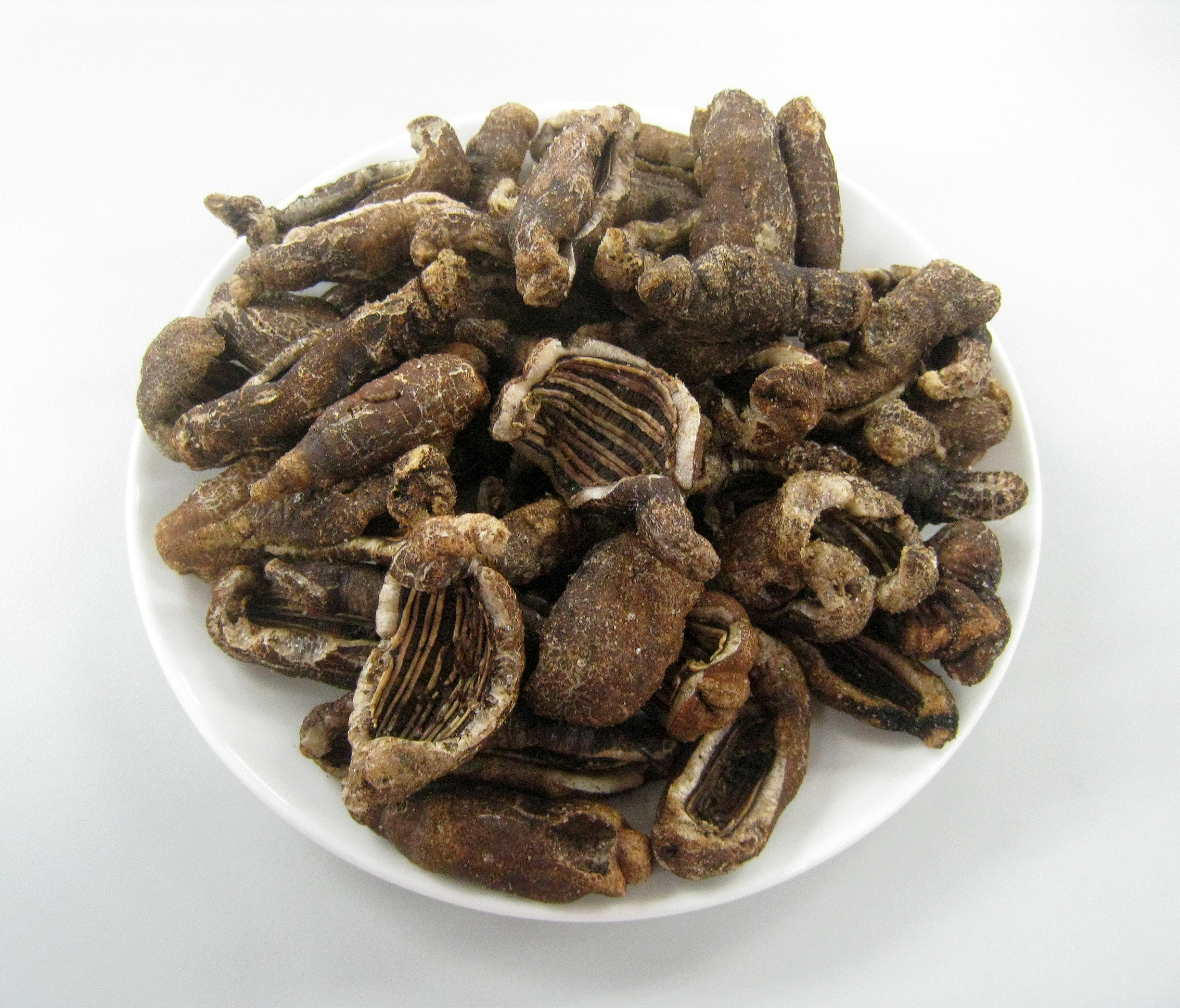
Kripik teripang, Indonesian sea cucumber cracker.

== Procurement ==
Sea cucumbers are harvested from the environment, both legally and illegally, and are increasingly farmed via aquaculture. The harvested animals are normally dried for resale. In 2016, prices on Alibaba ranged up to $1,000 per kilogram ($450/lb).

=== Commercial harvest ===
In recent years, the sea cucumber industry in Alaska has increased due to increased demand for the skins and muscles to China. Wild sea cucumbers are caught by divers. Wild Alaskan sea cucumbers have higher nutritional value and are larger than farmed Chinese sea cucumbers. Larger size and higher nutritional value has allowed the Alaskan fisheries to continue to compete for market share.

One of Australia's oldest fisheries is the collection of sea cucumber, harvested by divers from throughout the Coral Sea in far North Queensland, Torres Straits and Western Australia. In the late 1800s, as many as 400 divers operated from Cook Town, Queensland.

Overfishing of sea cucumbers in the Great Barrier Reef is threatening their population. Their popularity as luxury seafood in East Asian countries poses a serious threat.

=== Black market ===
As of 2013, a thriving black market was driven by demand in China where 450 grams (1 lb) at its peak might have sold for the equivalent of US$300 and a single sea cucumber for about US$160. A crackdown by governments both in and out of China reduced both prices and consumption, particularly among government officials who had been known to eat (and were able to afford purchasing) the most expensive and rare species. In the Caribbean Sea off the shores of the Yucatán Peninsula near fishing ports such as Dzilam de Bravo, illegal harvesting had devastated the population and resulted in conflict as rival gangs struggled to control the harvest.

=== Aquaculture ===
Overexploitation of sea cucumber stocks in many parts of the world provided motivation for the development of sea cucumber aquaculture in the early 1980s. The Chinese and Japanese were the first to develop successful hatchery technology on Apostichopus japonicus, prized for its high meat content and success in commercial hatcheries. Using techniques pioneered by the Chinese and Japanese, a second species, Holothuria scabra, was cultured for the first time in India in 1988. In recent years Australia, Indonesia, New Caledonia, Maldives, Solomon Islands and Vietnam have successfully cultured H. scabra using the same technology, and now culture other species.

== Conservation ==
In India, the commercial harvest and transportation of sea cucumbers has been strictly banned under Schedule I of the Wild Life (Protection) Act, 1972 (WLPA) since 2001. In 2020, the Indian government created the world's first sea cucumber conservation area, the Dr. K.K. Mohammed Koya Sea Cucumber Conservation Reserve, to protect the sea cucumber species.

== In popular culture ==
Sea cucumbers have inspired thousands of haiku in Japan, where they are called namako (海鼠), written with characters that can be translated as "sea mice" (an example of gikun). In English translations of these haiku, they are usually called "sea slugs". According to the Oxford English Dictionary, the English term "sea slug" was originally applied to holothuroids during the 18th century. The term is now applied to several groups of sea snails, marine gastropod mollusks that have no shell or only a very reduced shell, including the nudibranchs. Almost 1,000 Japanese holothuroid haiku translated into English appear in the book Rise, Ye Sea Slugs! by Robin D. Gill.

== Gallery ==
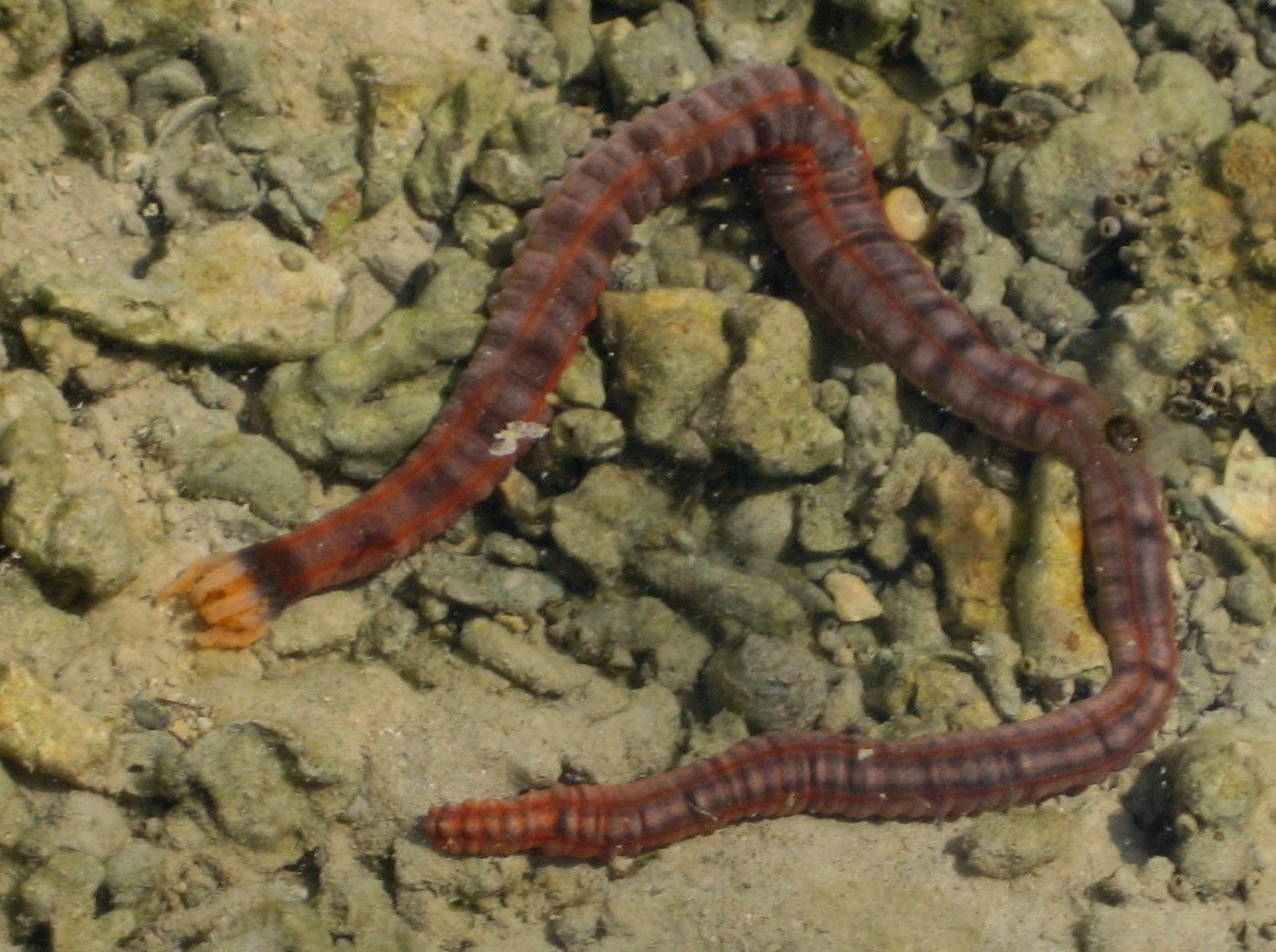
Conspicuous sea cucumber, Coconut Island, Hawaii

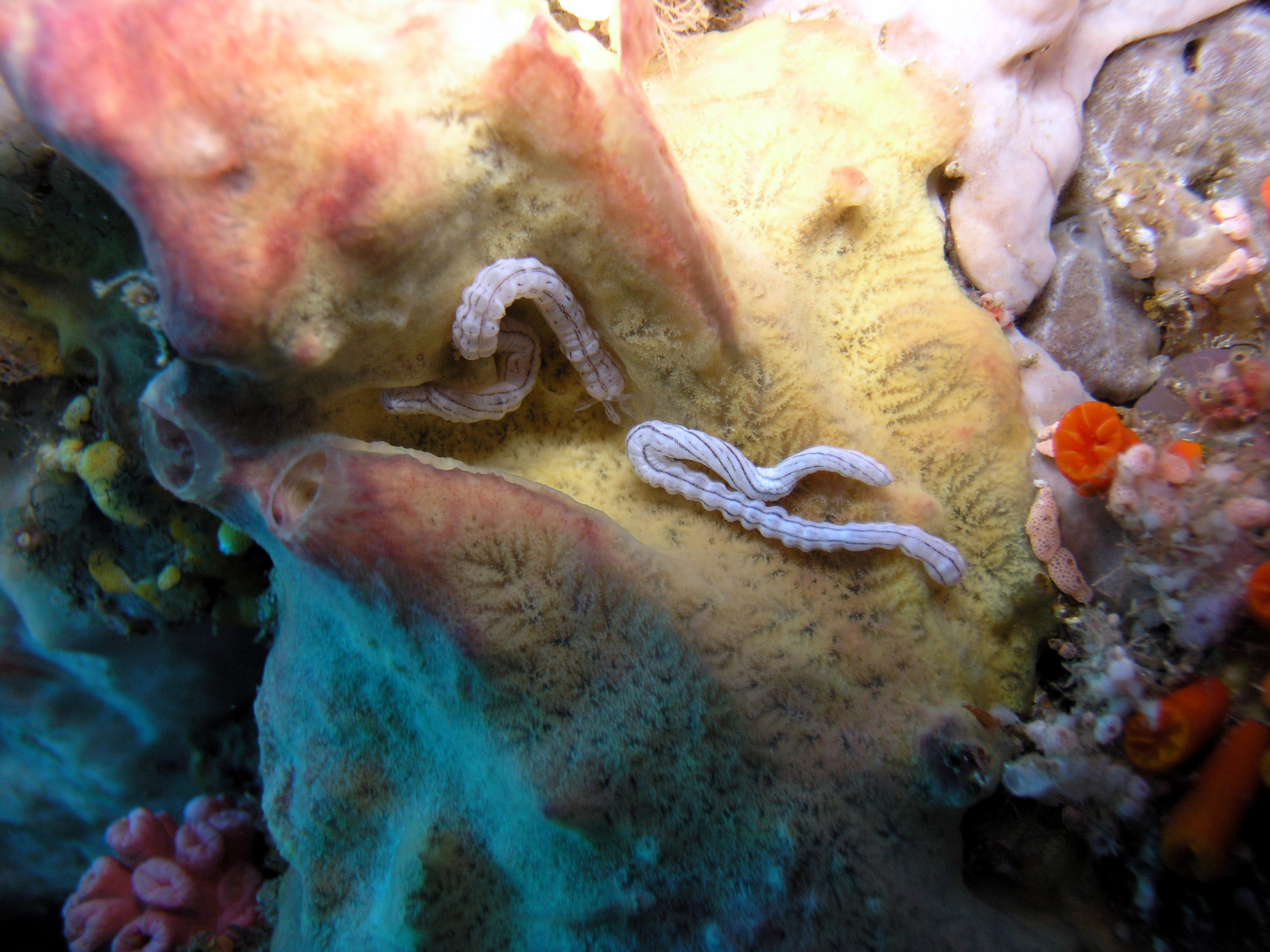
Synaptula lamperti lives on sponges

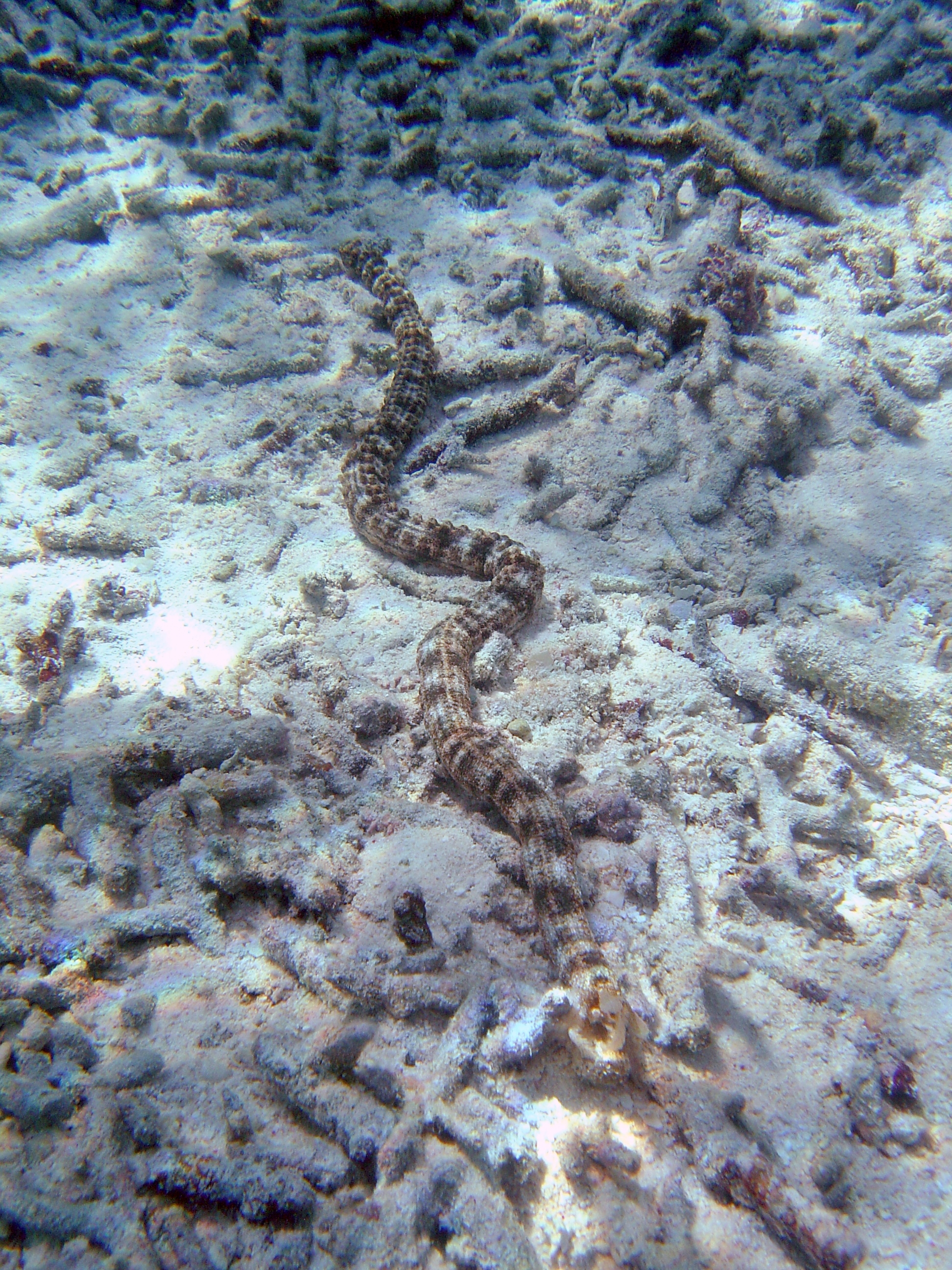
Synapta maculata, the longest known sea cucumber (Apodida).

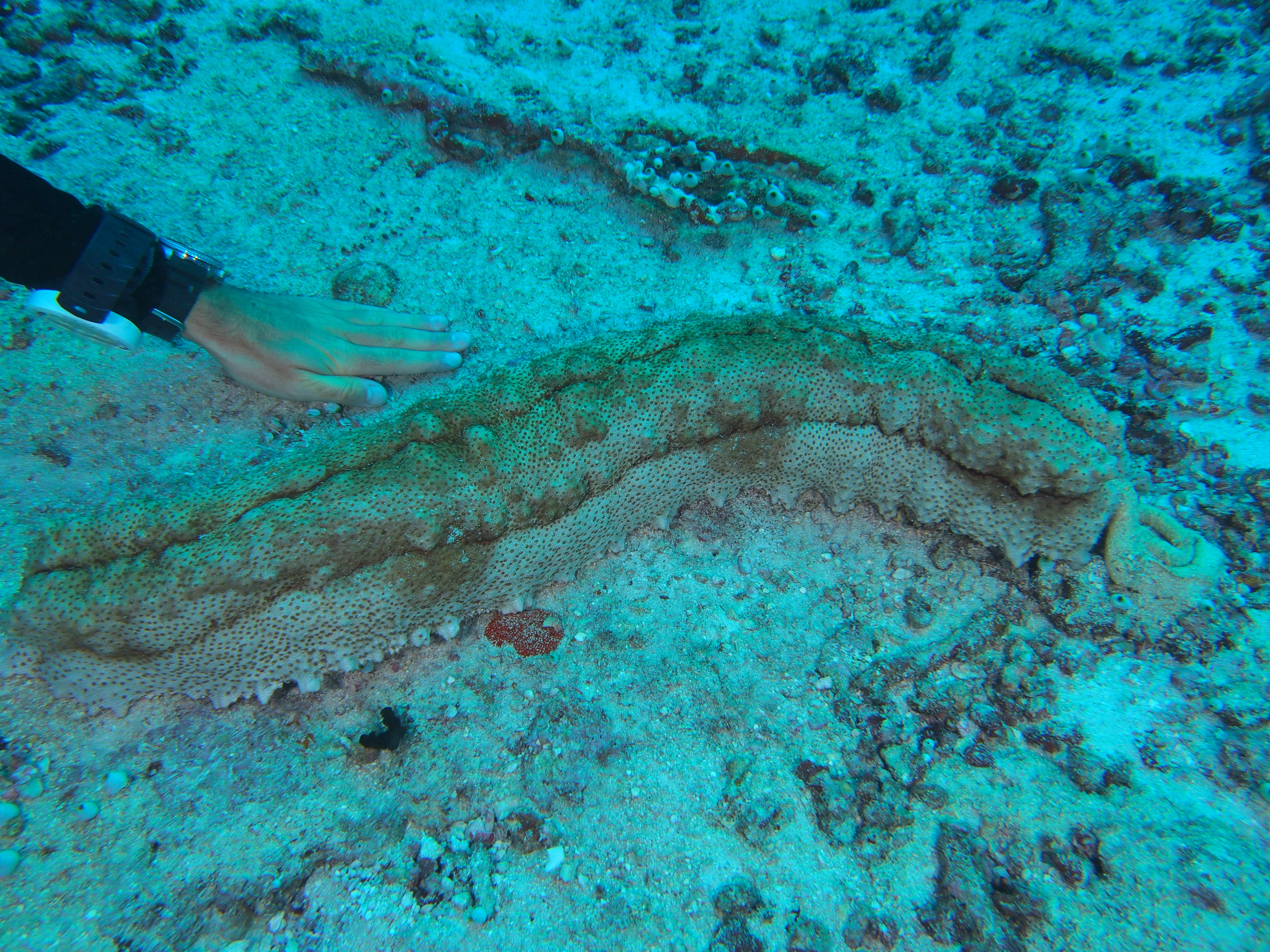
The king sea cucumber (Thelenota anax, family Stichopodidae) is one of the heaviest known holothuroids.

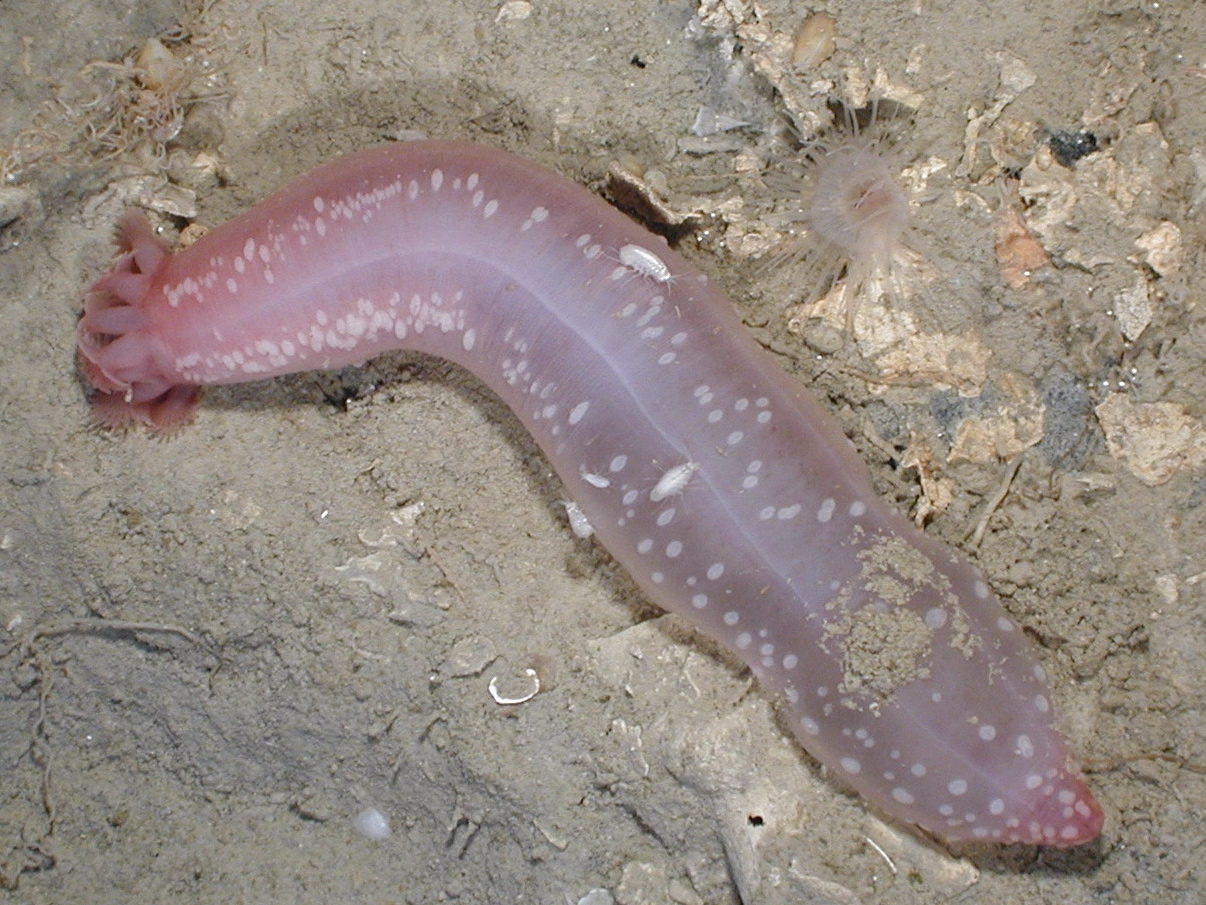
Chiridota hydrothermica, abyssal species.

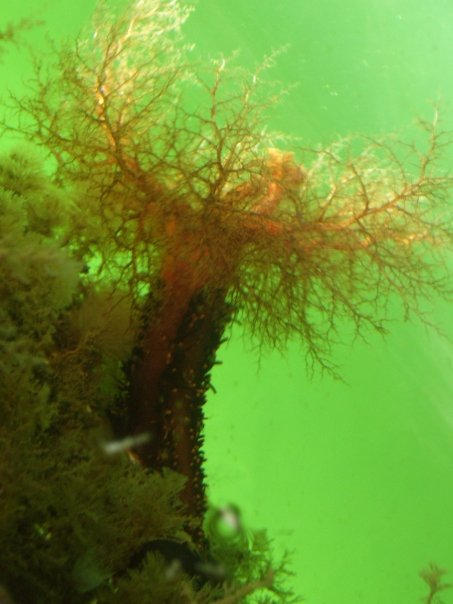
Cucumaria miniata, a filter-feeding sea cucumber.

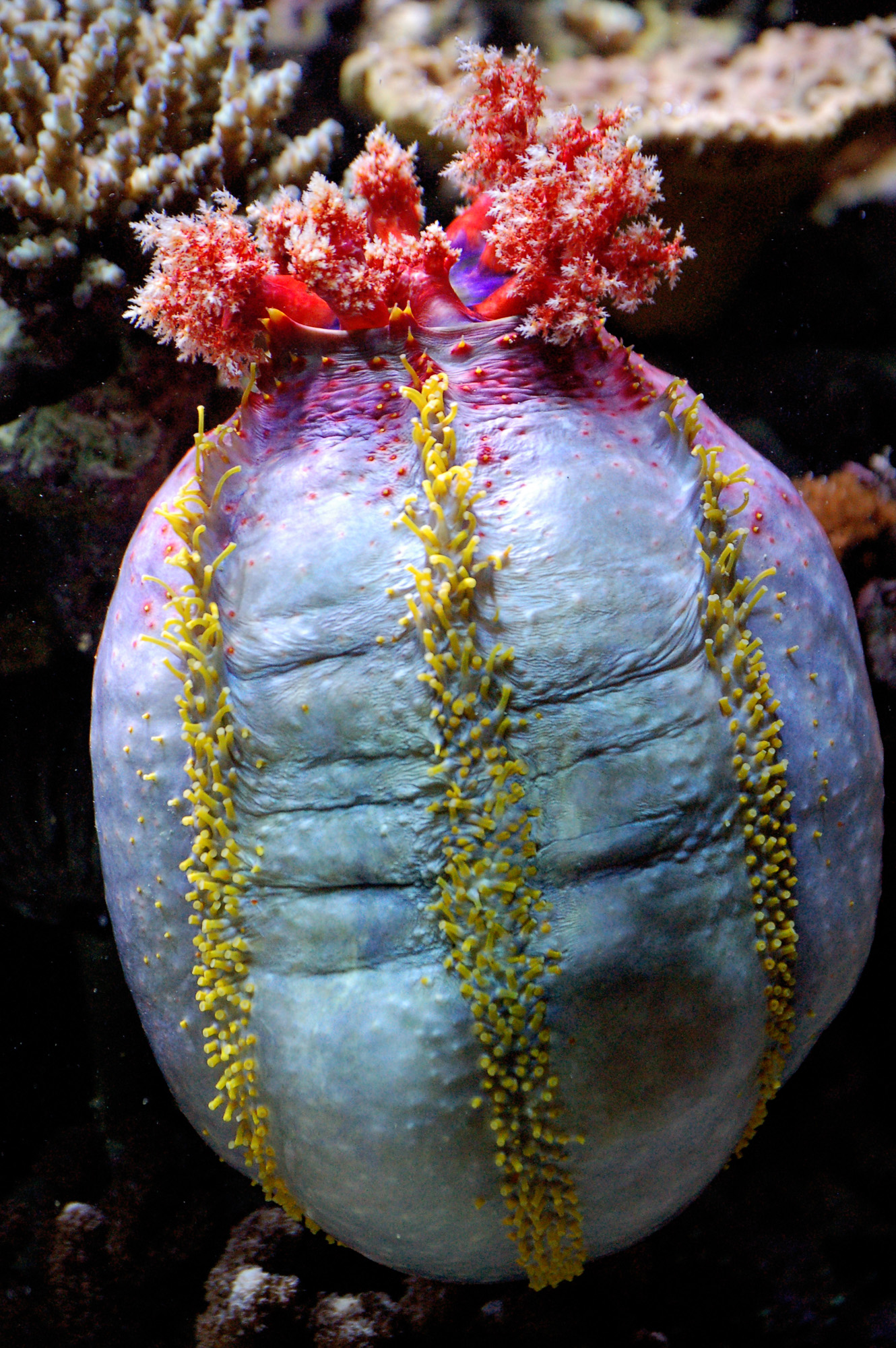
Pseudocolochirus ("sea apple").

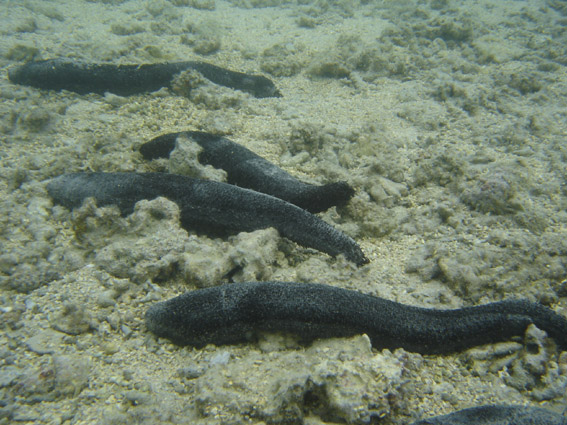
Holothuria leucospilota

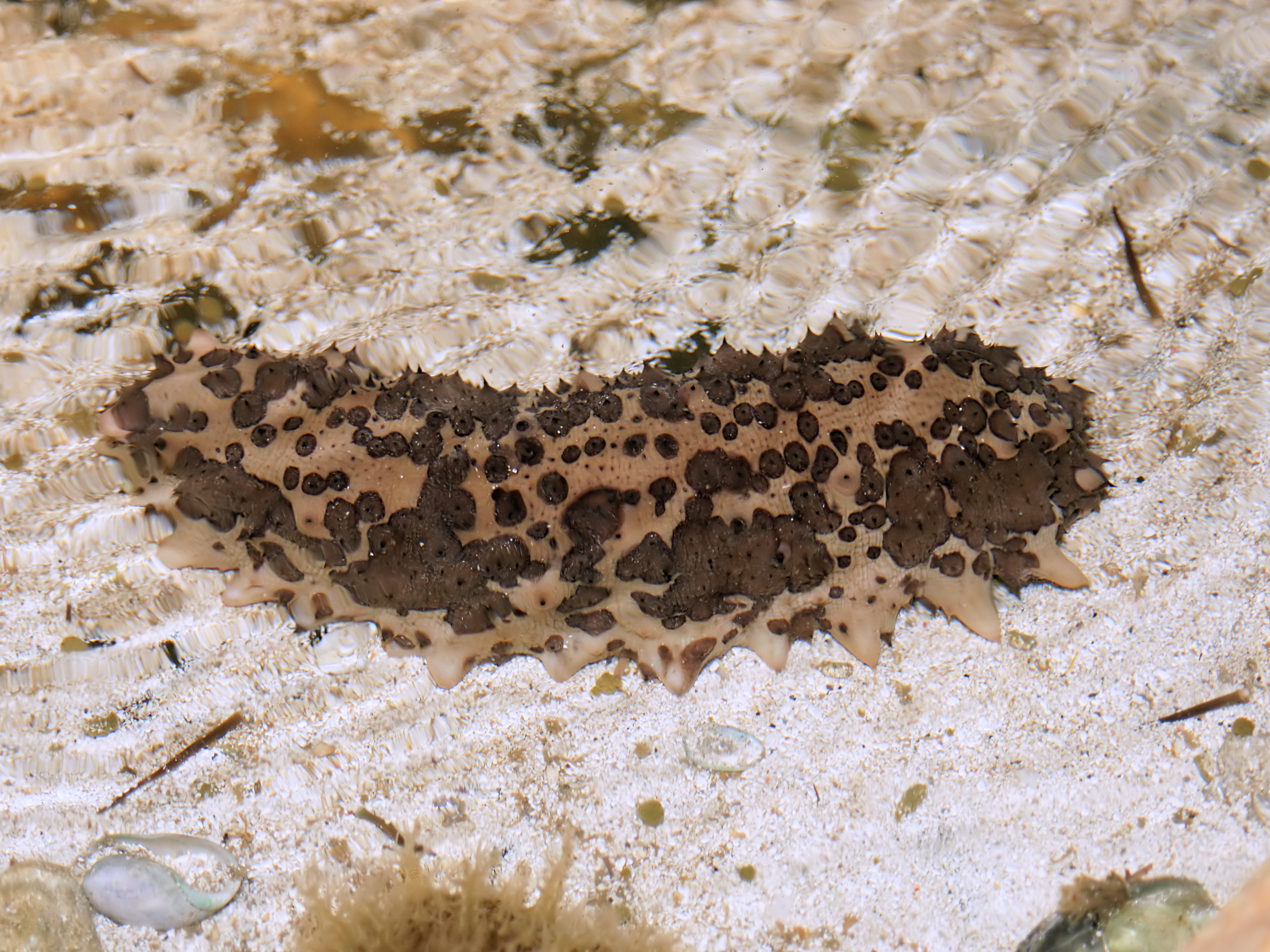
Isostichopus badionotus

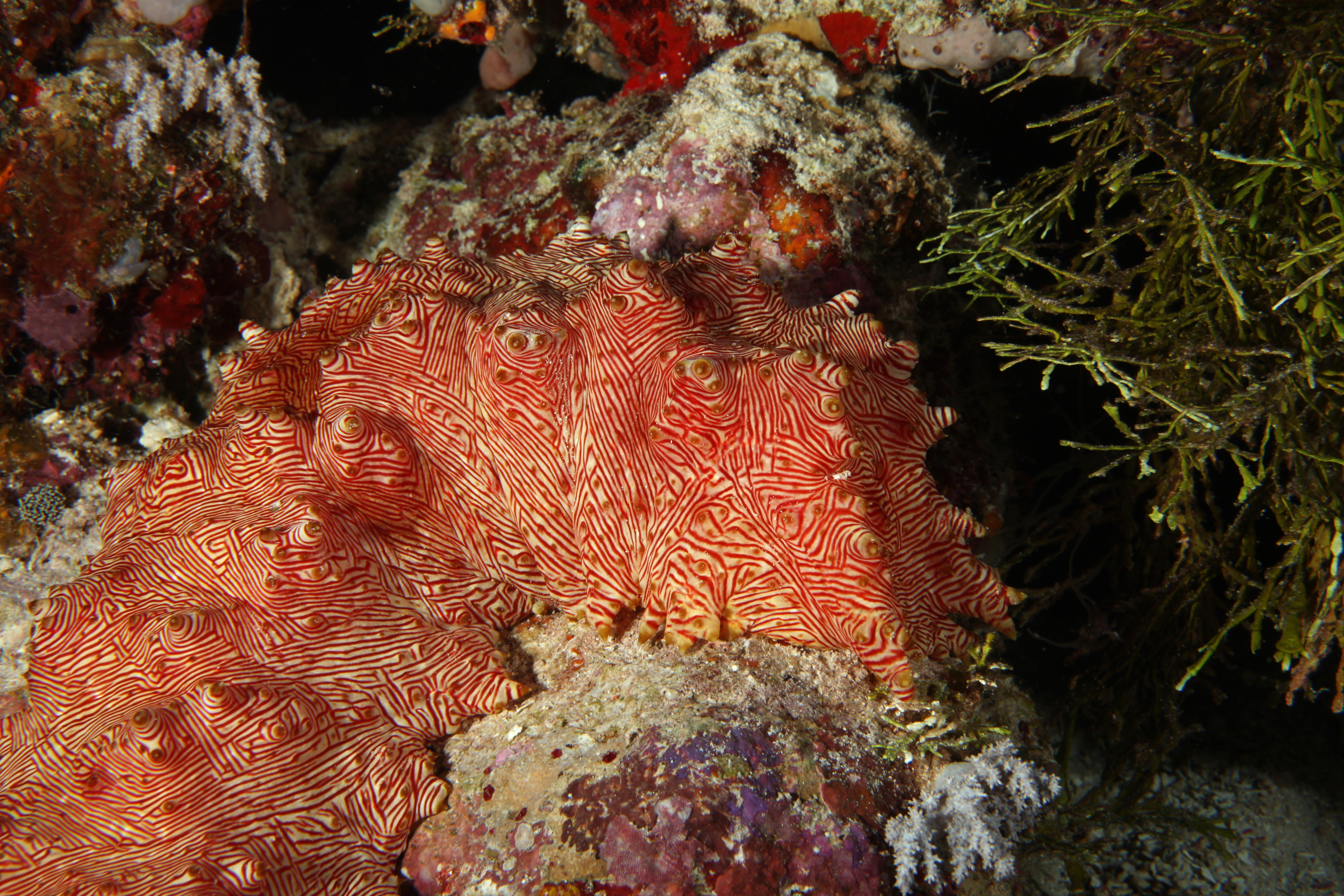
Thelenota rubralineata

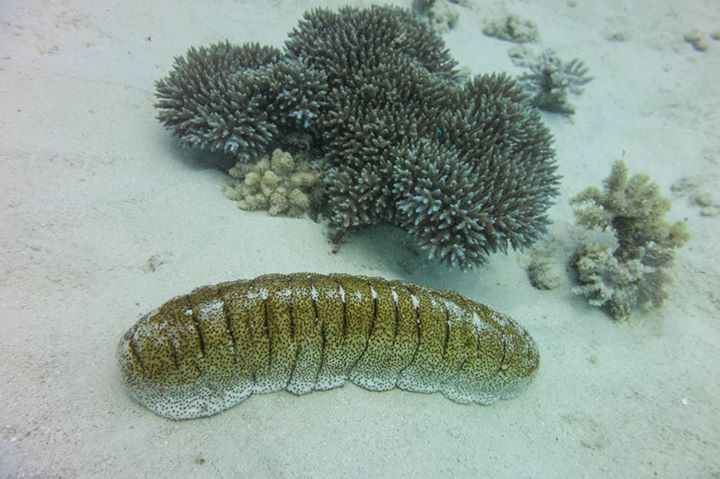
Holothuria fuscopunctata

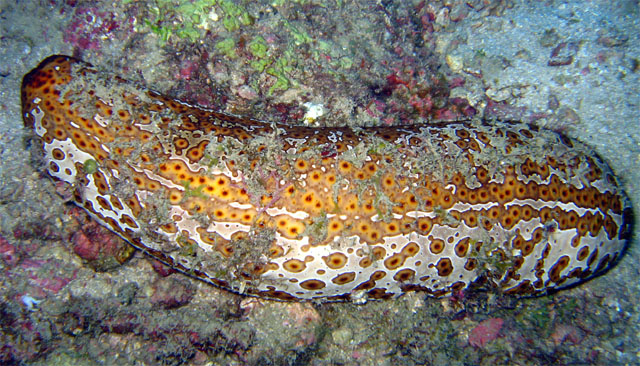
Bohadschia argus

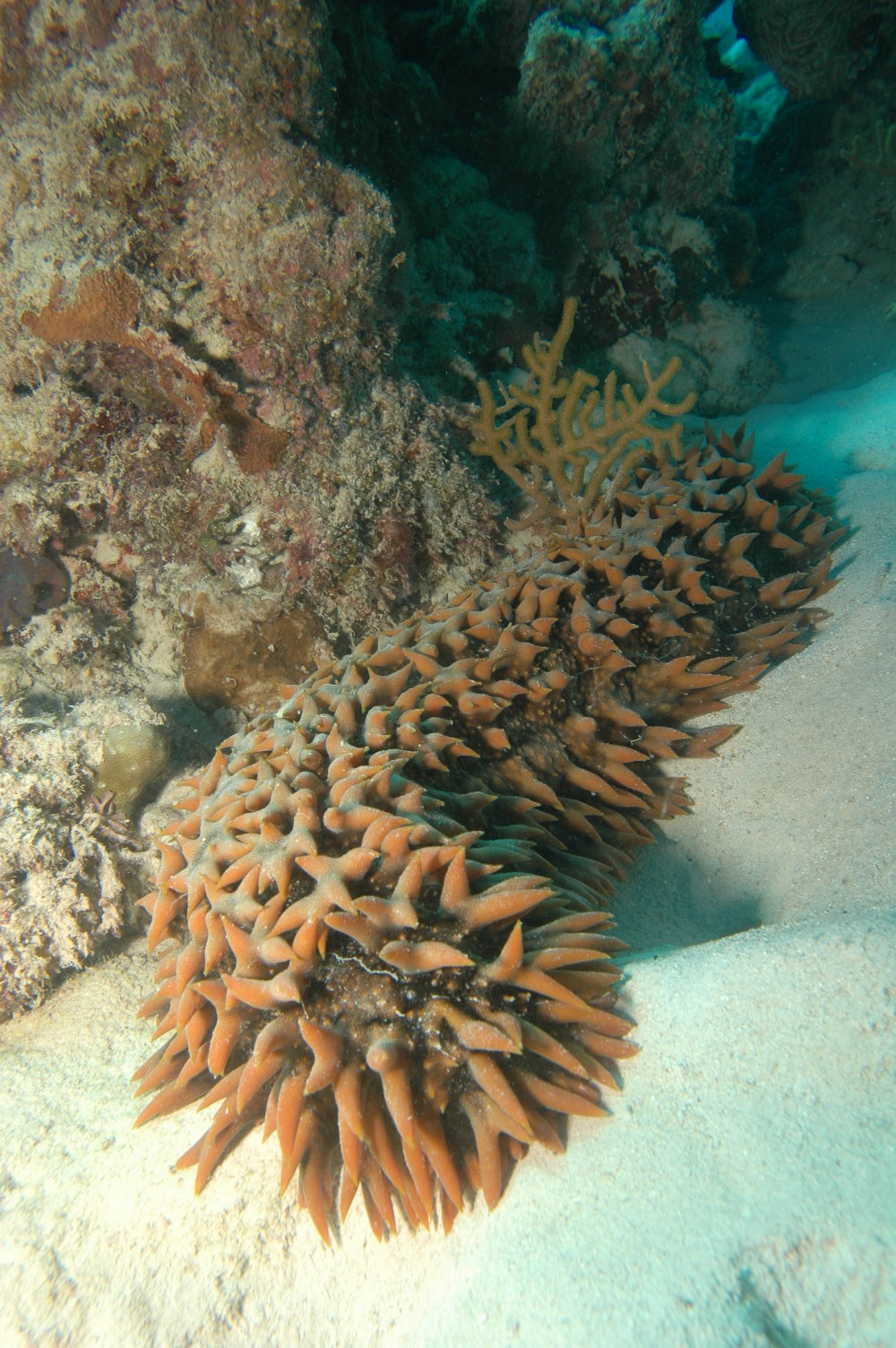
Thelenota ananas

== See also ==
- Gamat
- Trepanging
