= Leptosynapta dolabrifera =

Snot sea cucumber

Scientific classification
- Kingdom: Animalia
- Phylum: Echinodermata
- Class: Holothuroidea
- Order: Apodida
- Family: Synaptidae
- Genus: Leptosynapta
- Species: L. dolabrifera

Binomial name
- Leptosynapta dolabrifera Stimpson, 1855

Species of sea cucumber

Leptosynapta dolabrifera, the snot sea cucumber, is a small sea cucumber under the class Holothuroidea (1), in the family Synaptidae. It is most closely related to another species in its genus of 34 species Leptosynapta known as Leptosynapta inhaerens.

== Description ==
Snot sea cucumbers come in varying shapes and sizes, with lengths from 5 to 9 cm (1.9 to 3.5 in). The sea cucumber has small circular armored spines on its side to help in anchoring the creature and helping it to bury in the seafloor. Two to three toothed arms help to anchor and to extract nutrients from the substrate. There are no variations by sex (2). They are chubby with a pink, purple, red or white body and they are often covered in mucus. The thickness and length of the Leptopsynapta dolabrifera can vary with the amount of body wall muscle. Many light-colored snot sea cucumbers have translucent body walls (8)

== Distribution ==
Leptosynapta dolabrifera has been known to inhabit areas around the coasts of Australia (3), and have also been recorded in Portland, Oregon (4) and some areas of Scotland in recent years. It prefers to inhabit temperate, shallow waters. Recent studies reveal that the average density of L. dolabrifera in an area is 0.20 (4). The sea snot cucumber is a favorite food of the Eastern shovelnose stingaree, making up 4.7% of their diet (5). L. dolabrifera is not thought to be endangered as of 2021.

== Habitat ==
The habitat L. dolabrifera lives in consists of nutrient rich substrate, either silty and fine substrate for shallow areas and dark, clay-like substrates for deeper waters (6). Sometimes, L. dolabrifera is seen in rockier areas, such as in coral skeletons in Edinburgh, Scotland (7).

== Feeding and diet ==
Like most other sea cucumbers, snot sea cucumbers burrow themselves in sand or mud, and extracts nutrients with their tentacles. Their diet consists entirely of the substrates it consumes via digging into the sands and pushing substrate into its mouth with its anchors, leaving discarded trails of sand as waste behind.

== Regeneration ==
Sea cucumbers in the genus Leptosynapta have the ability to regenerate parts of its body if certain sections are lost due to ecological or predatory circumstances. This process of regeneration is called morphallaxis, where any residual tissues of the sea cucumber are redifferentiated to produce a smaller, but complete, animal. When transections are made, any residual pieces that include both the mouth and part of the digestive tract are capable of regeneration. Although, the time that it takes to regenerate can vary depending on the location of transection. The anatomy of the sea cucumber consists of the esophagus, the stomach, and the intestine. The esophagus connects the mouth to the stomach, and it is the most anterior of this three-section digestive tract. The intestine is the most posterior of the three-section digestive tract, and it lies between the stomach and the anus. The stomach and esophagus are suspended in the dorsal mesentery, while the intestine is suspended in the ventral mesentery. In the mid-section of the Leptosynapta dolibrifera, the digestive tract crosses the coelomic cavity, and the area where the mesenteric attachment to the gut changes from dorsal to ventral orientation. This stomach-intestine junction is called the crossover point.

If a transection of the sea cucumber is made anteriorly to the crossover point, regeneration will occur, but the result will lack an intestine. Within 48 hours and 72 hours, the gut will slowly transition from its original dorsal attachment to a ventral attachment, moving posteriorly to anteriorly. The gut will continue to shift anteriorly until the original crossover point adjusts proportionally to the remaining sea cucumber body. The sea cucumber will be fully regenerated within 144 hours of transection.

If a transection of a sea cucumber is made posteriorly to the crossover point, then the esophagus, the stomach, and the intestine will all be represented in the final form of the sea cucumber. Similar processes as regeneration of an anterior transection will occur, and the sea cucumber will be considered completely regenerated between 120 and 144 hours of regeneration.

== In popular culture ==
Episode 20 of the children's animated series Octonauts, entitled "Octonauts and the Snot Sea Cucumber", is centered around an injured snot sea cucumber named Slippy.
