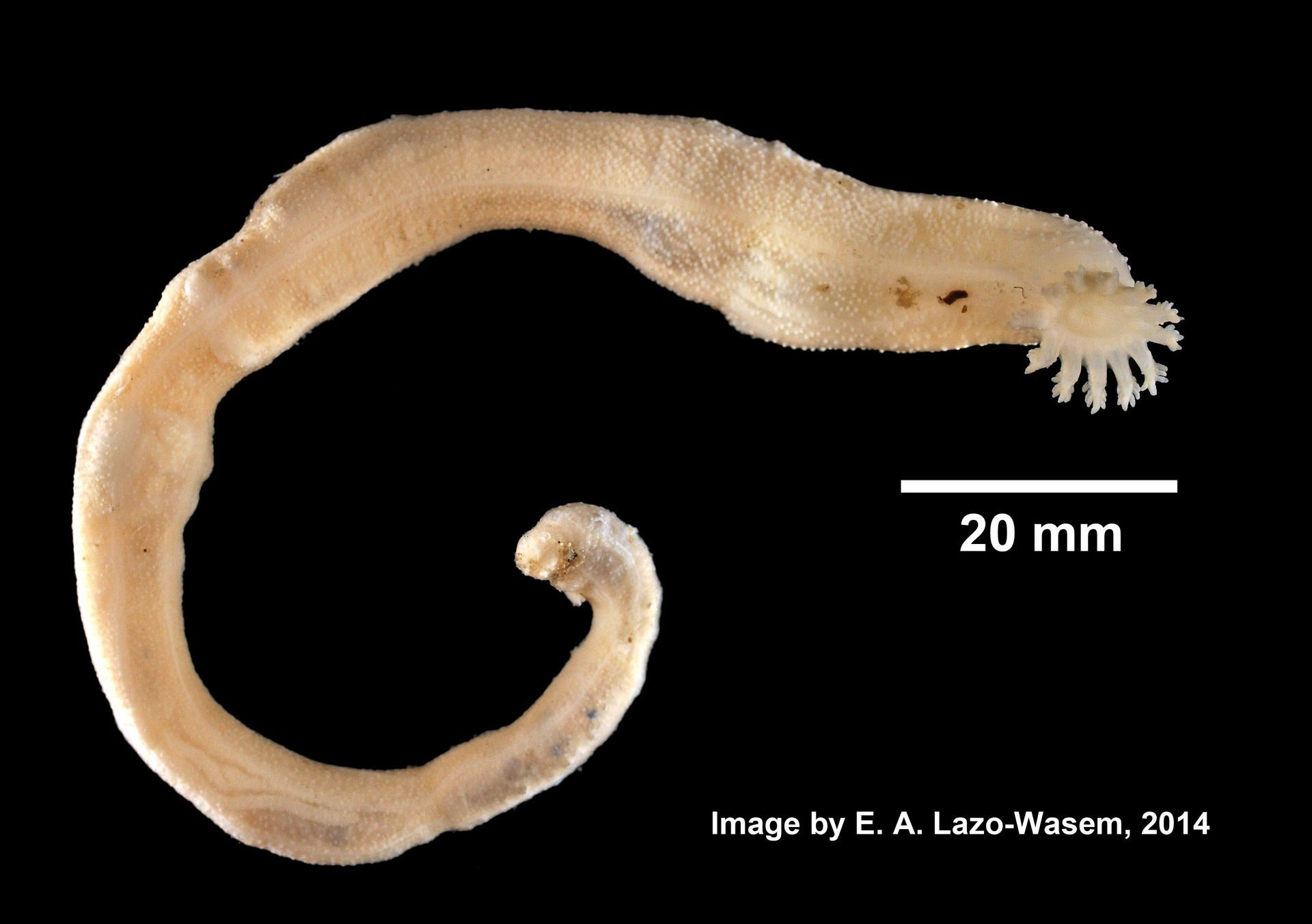

Conservation status
- Secure (NatureServe)

Scientific classification
- Kingdom: Animalia
- Phylum: Echinodermata
- Class: Holothuroidea
- Order: Apodida
- Family: Synaptidae
- Genus: Leptosynapta
- Species: L. tenuis

Binomial name
- Leptosynapta tenuis Ayres, 1851

Synonyms
- Synapta ayresii (Selenka, 1867); Synapta gracilis (Selenka, 1867); Synapta tenuis (Ayres, 1851)

= Leptosynapta tenuis =

Species of burrowing sea cucumber

Leptosynapta tenuis, commonly known as the white synapta or the slender footless sea cucumber, is a species of sea cucumber in the family Synaptidae.

== Description ==
Leptosynapta tenuis has a skinny and long vermiform, fragile body that can reach up to about 15 cm (6 in) long and 0.6 cm (0.2 in) wide. The body of L. tenuis lacks tube feet, except for the 12 branched oral tentacles surrounding its mouth. Each of these oral tentacles has 5 to 7 feather-like branches. There are The body wall has hook-like ossicles that allow it to stick to the walls of its burrows. The body of the sea cucumber is white or tan and semitransparent. L. tenuis lacks an internal respiratory tree.

== Reproduction ==
The reproduction cycle of L. tenuis is bimodal annual. Breeding occurs three months before and after July through August. The middle non-breeding period aligns with the highest yearly seawater temperatures, suggesting temperature control of gamete production. The sea cucumber is a hermaphrodite that releases spermatozoa and oocytes during the same breeding period, but with spermatozoa being released first.

== Distribution and habitat ==
Leptosynapta tenuis is found across the coast of North America as well as the western coast of the Gulf of Mexico. Within this range the sea cucumber is found in sand flats and other small-sediment coastal habitats to 194 m deep.

== Ecology ==
In regions where L. tenuis is found, the sea cucumber is a major bioturbator. L. tenuis creates shallow U-shaped burrows. One end of the burrow is meant for feeding and water supply by being open while the other end is a site for fecal waste to be released. The holes of these burrows are marked by small funnel-like depressions. These burrows tend to be 12 to 15 cm deep and the holes about 2 cm wide.

To create a current of water in the burrow, L. tenuis does anterior to posterior peristalsis. This water current provides inflow of oxygen for respiration at its skin as well as plankton and organic material for deposit feeding.

Leptosynapta tenuis may be found with the small bivalve Austrodevonia percompressa attached to it with byssal threads. The relationship seems to be commensalistic, with the bivalve get protection and food from the burrow while not affecting the sea cucumber. The burrows and fecal mounds may also be home to other benthic infauna, including polychaete worms, isopods, and amphipods.
