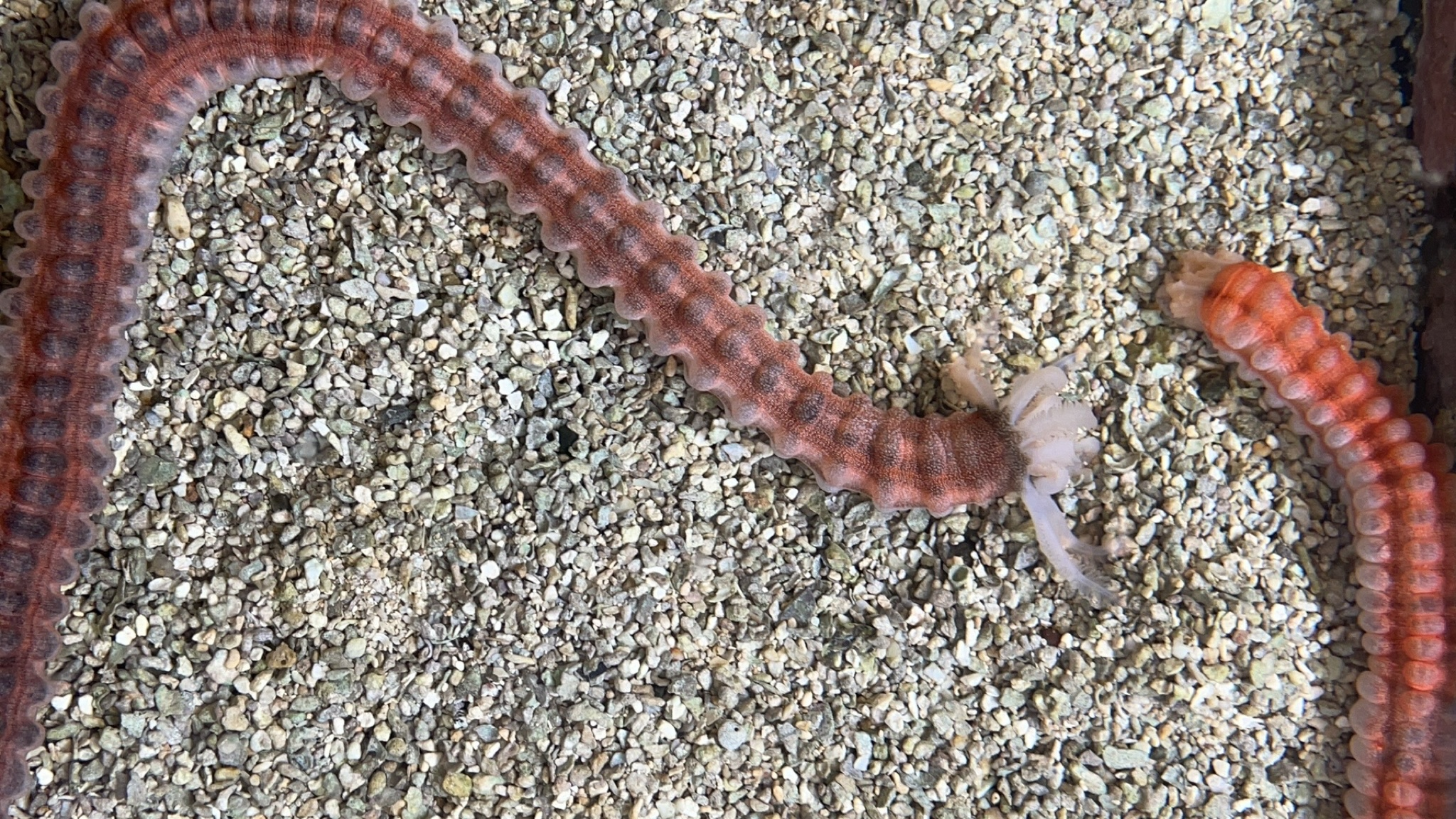

Scientific classification
- Kingdom: Animalia
- Phylum: Echinodermata
- Class: Holothuroidea
- Order: Apodida
- Family: Synaptidae
- Genus: Opheodesoma
- Species: O. spectabilis

Binomial name
- Opheodesoma spectabilis Fisher, 1907

= Opheodesoma spectabilis =

Species of sea cucumber

Opheodesoma spectabilis is a synaptid sea cucumber in the Indo-Pacific that can be locally very abundant.

== Description ==
With their flexible, wormlike bodies and mouth surrounded by tentacles Opheodesoma spectabilis varies in color. From a shade of gray when above water, to a rich chocolate brown or "bloodsucker" red when below water.

== Biology ==
As sea cucumbers most commonly do, the Opheodesoma are invertebrates that start their life cycle as Planktotrophic larvae. They then grow into cylinder-shaped doliolaria who metamorphose into the juvenile opheodesoma spectabilis you often see today.

== Distribution and habitat ==
Opheodesoma spectabilis is located in subtropical and tropical areas such as New Caledonia, Hawaii, the Indo-Pacific, East Africa, and Guam. Generally found at the bottom of the ocean floor within the sand, crumble, shells, and brown algae called Sargassum.

== Diet ==
These conspicuous creatures are bottom feeders, a.k.a. reef janitors. Their diets mainly consist of dead plant and animal particles. This animal eats by accumulating the particles with its tentacles and then depositing said particles into its mouth.
