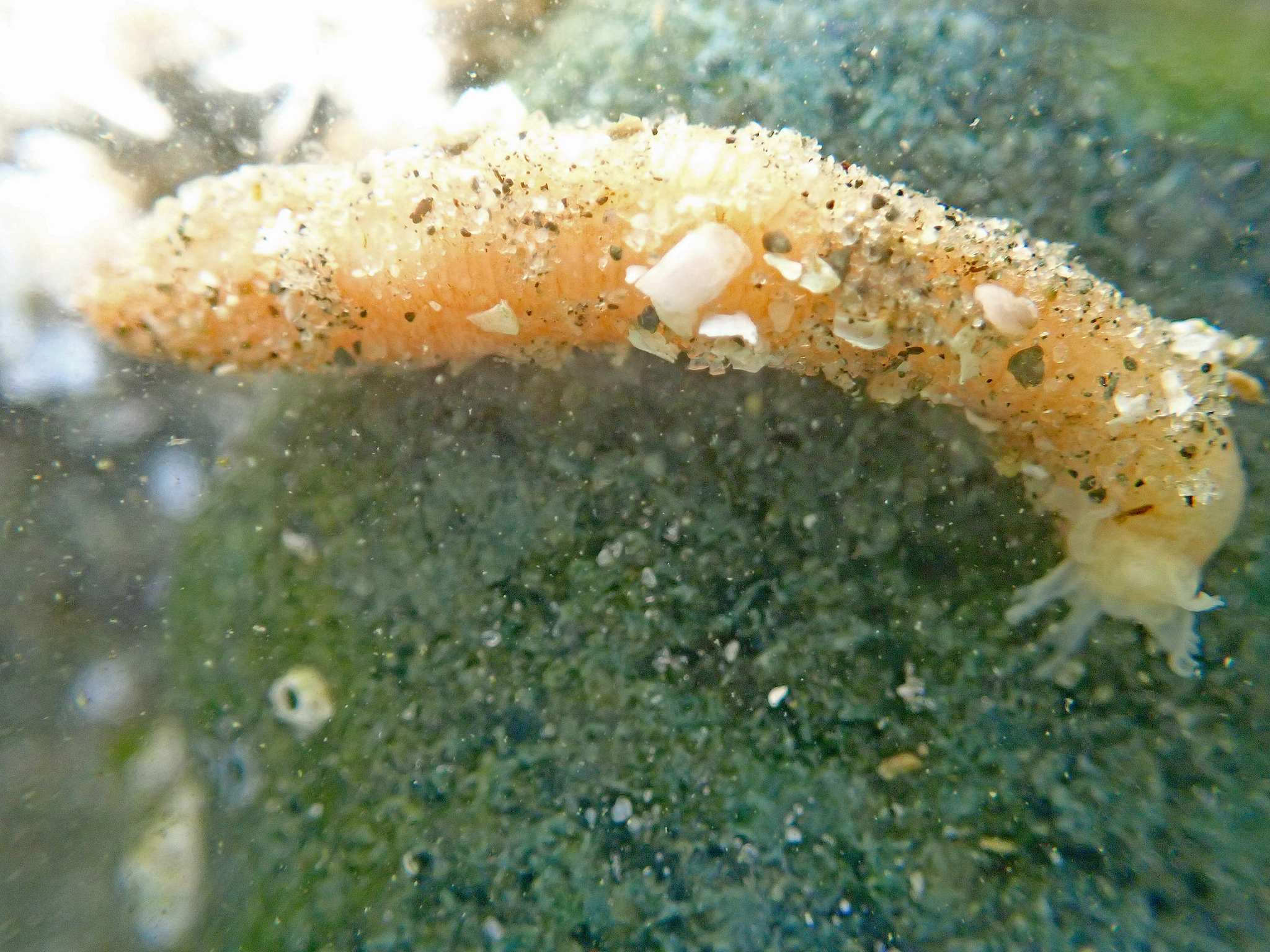

Conservation status
- Secure (NatureServe)

Scientific classification
- Kingdom: Animalia
- Phylum: Echinodermata
- Class: Holothuroidea
- Order: Apodida
- Family: Synaptidae
- Genus: Leptosynapta
- Species: L. clarki

Binomial name
- Leptosynapta clarki Heding, 1928

= Leptosynapta clarki =

Species of sea cucumber

Leptosynapta clarki, is a species of sea cucumber in the family Synaptidae. Commonly called skin breathing sea cucumbers, they live along the northwest coast of North America, from northern California to the Gulf of Alaska. They are pink and gelatinous and partially translucent, and are about 0.5 in (1.3 cm) long, but can reach up to 6 in (15 cm). The burrow in sand along the low tideline. On rare occasions, when low tides and high surf conditions combine, thousands of these sea cucumbers can wash up on beaches to dry up and die, such as on October 21, 2025, in Seaside, Oregon.
