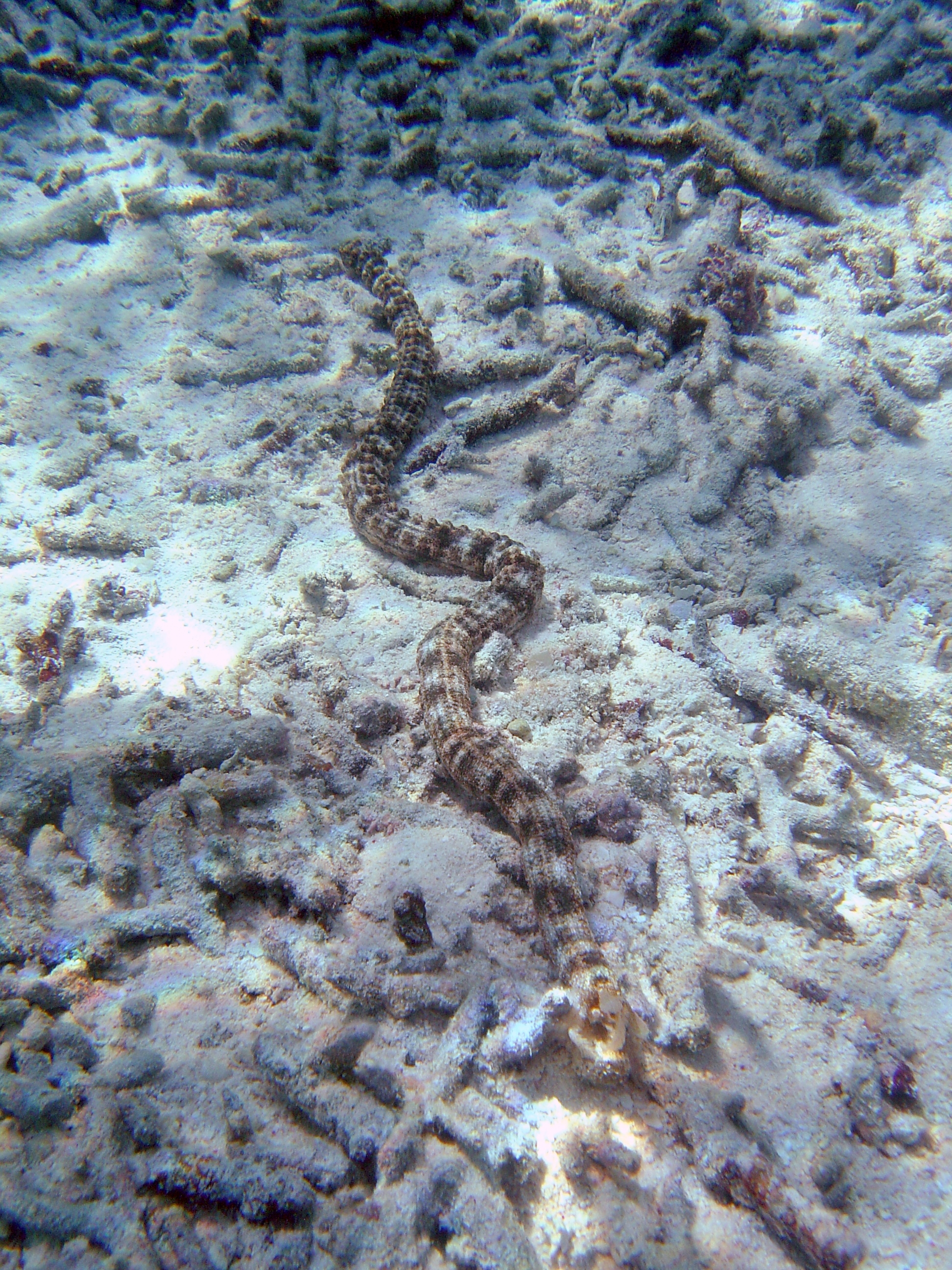

Scientific classification
- Kingdom: Animalia
- Phylum: Echinodermata
- Class: Holothuroidea
- Order: Apodida
- Family: Synaptidae
- Genus: Synapta
- Species: S. maculata

Binomial name
- Synapta maculata (Chamisso & Eysenhardt, 1821)

= Synapta maculata =

Species of sea cucumber

Synapta maculata, the snake sea cucumber, is a species of sea cucumber in the family Synaptidae. It is found in shallow waters in the tropical Indo-Pacific Ocean. Sometimes growing as long as 3 m (10 ft), it is one of the longest sea cucumbers in the world.

== Description ==
S. maculata is a long, slender sea cucumber with fifteen tentacles, growing to a length of about 2 m (7 ft). Although not the heaviest or bulkiest sea cucumber in the world, it is probably the longest, with individuals exceptionally reaching to over 3 m (10 ft). Its colouring is variable, being some shade of yellowish-brown with wide longitudinal stripes and patches of darker colour. The ossicles (microscopic calcareous spike-like structures that support the body wall) are large and shaped like anchors and are used in locomotion; they can be as long as 2 mm. The ossicles are adhesive, and the sea cucumber is very difficult to detach from a wetsuit.

== Distribution and habitat ==
The species is native to the tropical western Indo-Pacific region. It occurs at depths down to about 20 m (66 ft) on reefs and on soft sediments on the seabed among seagrasses and seaweeds. It can also bury itself under rubble.

== Biology ==
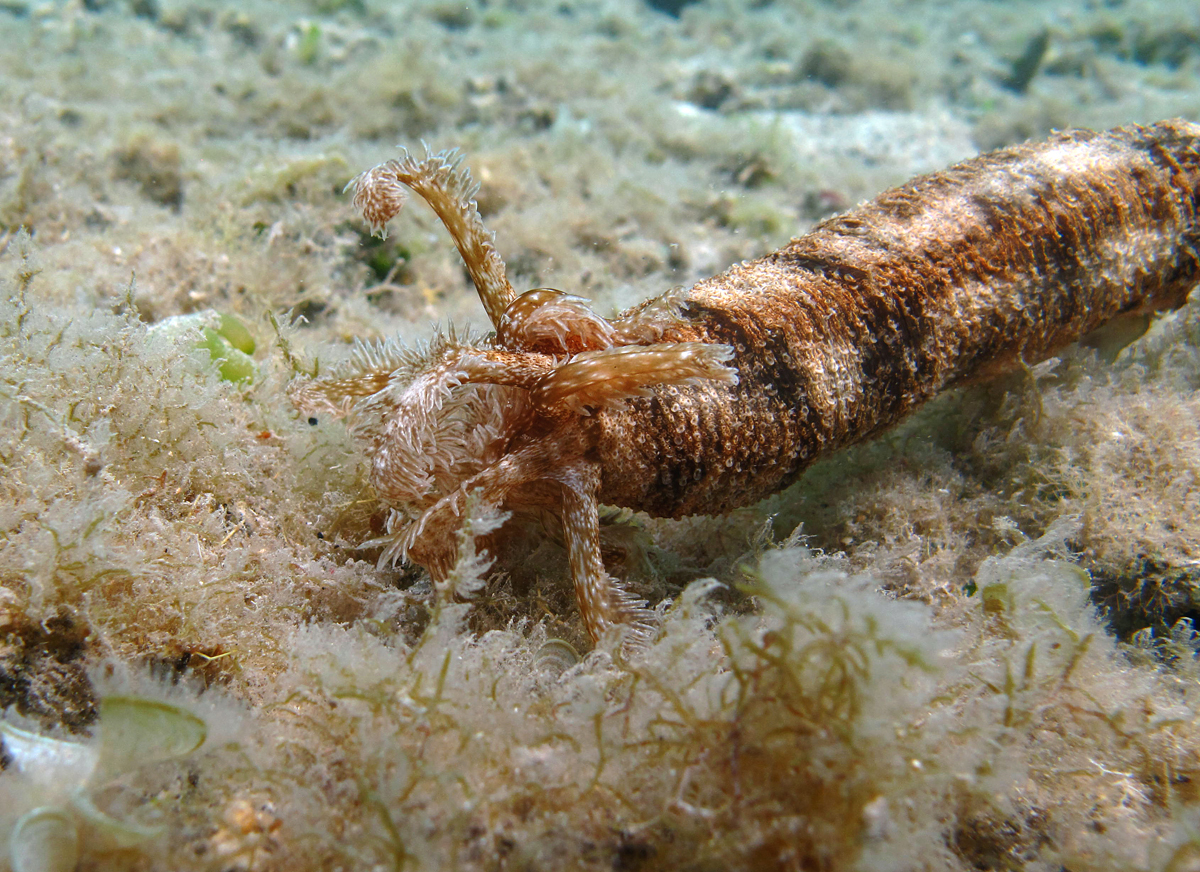
Tentacles surround the mouth

The tentacles of Synapta maculata surround the mouth and are used in surface feeding. They are about 2.5 cm (1 in) long when extended and have a short stem and a feather-like blade with thirty to forty pairs of pinnules. The outer surfaces of the tentacles have numerous bulges and are adhesive while the inner surfaces are smooth, with clusters of cilia on the proximal parts. The tentacles are in continuous motion; they flatten themselves against the substrate or seagrass leaf blades and collect food particles by adhesion, then bend inwards until the tips are in the mouth, where the food is scraped off by the buccal sphincter muscle. The whole process takes only a few seconds, and several tentacles can deliver their loads at the same time. If the animal is disturbed, the tentacles can contract back into the pharynx, but before long they are out again, collecting more particles.

The outer surface of the tentacles bears numerous vesicular cells, and there are a few scattered vesicles on the body surface also. The function of these cells is unclear, but it is suggested that they may contain a noxious substance and serve a defensive function. The tentacles are particularly vulnerable to predation by fish, but if they taste nasty, that enables the sea cucumber to spend a greater proportion of its time feeding, rather than having to keep retracting its tentacles whenever a fish approaches. There are also some cup-shaped structures on the inside of the tentacles near the stem. It is hypothesized that these are rudimentary sensory organs, able to taste the edibility of the food material that the animal is transporting to its mouth.

A defensive response made by many sea cucumbers is evisceration, but in the case of S. maculata, autotomy is preferred, with large individuals dispensing with sections near the rear end while smaller individuals break into many pieces. Two previously unknown triterpene holostane glycosides have been isolated from S. maculata; one has moderate activity against HeLa tumour cells while the other is inactive.

== In literature ==
Naturalist Gerald Durrell's 1977 observations of this creature were made when he was snorkeling in shallow water in Mauritius:

"At first, I could not believe that these weird objects were alive. I thought they must be strange, dead strands of some deep-sea seaweed now washed into the shallows by the tide, to roll and undulate helplessly on the sand to the small movements of the sea. Closer inspection showed me that they were indeed alive, unlikely though it seemed. Sinucta muculata [sic], as this strange creature is called, is really a sort of elongated tube, which sucks in water at one end and with it microscopic organisms, and expels the water at the other."
