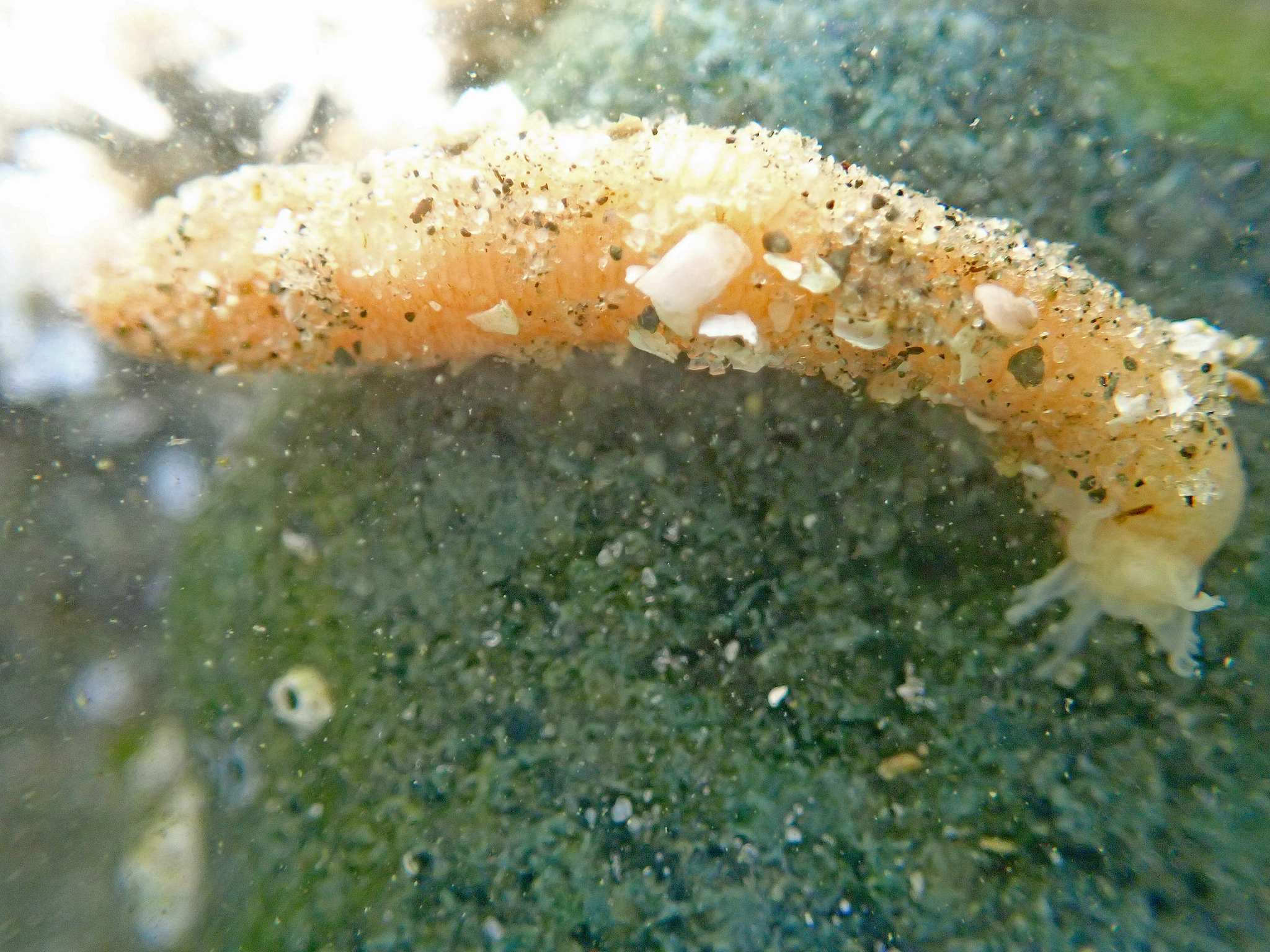
- Leptosynapta clarki

Scientific classification
- Kingdom: Animalia
- Phylum: Echinodermata
- Class: Holothuroidea
- Order: Apodida
- Family: Synaptidae
- Genus: Leptosynapta; Verrill, 1867

Species
- see text

= Leptosynapta =

Genus of sea cucumbers

Leptosynapta is a genus of sea cucumbers, in the family Synaptidae.

== List of species ==
The genus contains the following species:

- Leptosynapta albicans (Selenka, 1867)
- Leptosynapta ancoracuta Cherbonnier, 1954
- Leptosynapta chela Mortensen, 1926
- Leptosynapta circopatina Clark, 1924
- Leptosynapta clarki Heding, 1928
- Leptosynapta crassipatina Clark, 1924
- Leptosynapta cruenta Cherbonnier, 1953
- Leptosynapta decaria (Östergren, 1905)
- Leptosynapta dolabrifera (Stimpson, 1855)
- Leptosynapta galliennii (Herapath, 1865)
- Leptosynapta geyserensis Cherbonnier, 1988
- Leptosynapta imswe Pawson, 1976
- Leptosynapta inhaerens (O.F. Müller, 1776)
- Leptosynapta knysnaensis (Cherbonnier, 1952)
- Leptosynapta latipatina Clark, 1921
- Leptosynapta longhursti Cherbonnier, 1958
- Leptosynapta macrankyra (Ludwig, 1898)
- Leptosynapta marchadi Cherbonnier, 1963
- Leptosynapta micropatina Heding, 1928
- Leptosynapta minuta (Becher, 1906)
- Leptosynapta multigranula Clark, 1924
- Leptosynapta naiga Thandar & Rowe, 1989
- Leptosynapta nannoplax Pawson, 1976
- Leptosynapta oblonga Cherbonnier, 1988
- Leptosynapta parvipatina Clark, 1924
- Leptosynapta pustulosa Cherbonnier, 1970
- Leptosynapta roseogradia Pawson, 1976
- Leptosynapta steinitzi Cherbonnier, 1967
- Leptosynapta tantula Cherbonnier, 1988
- Leptosynapta tenuis (Ayres, 1851)
- Leptosynapta transgressor Heding, 1928
