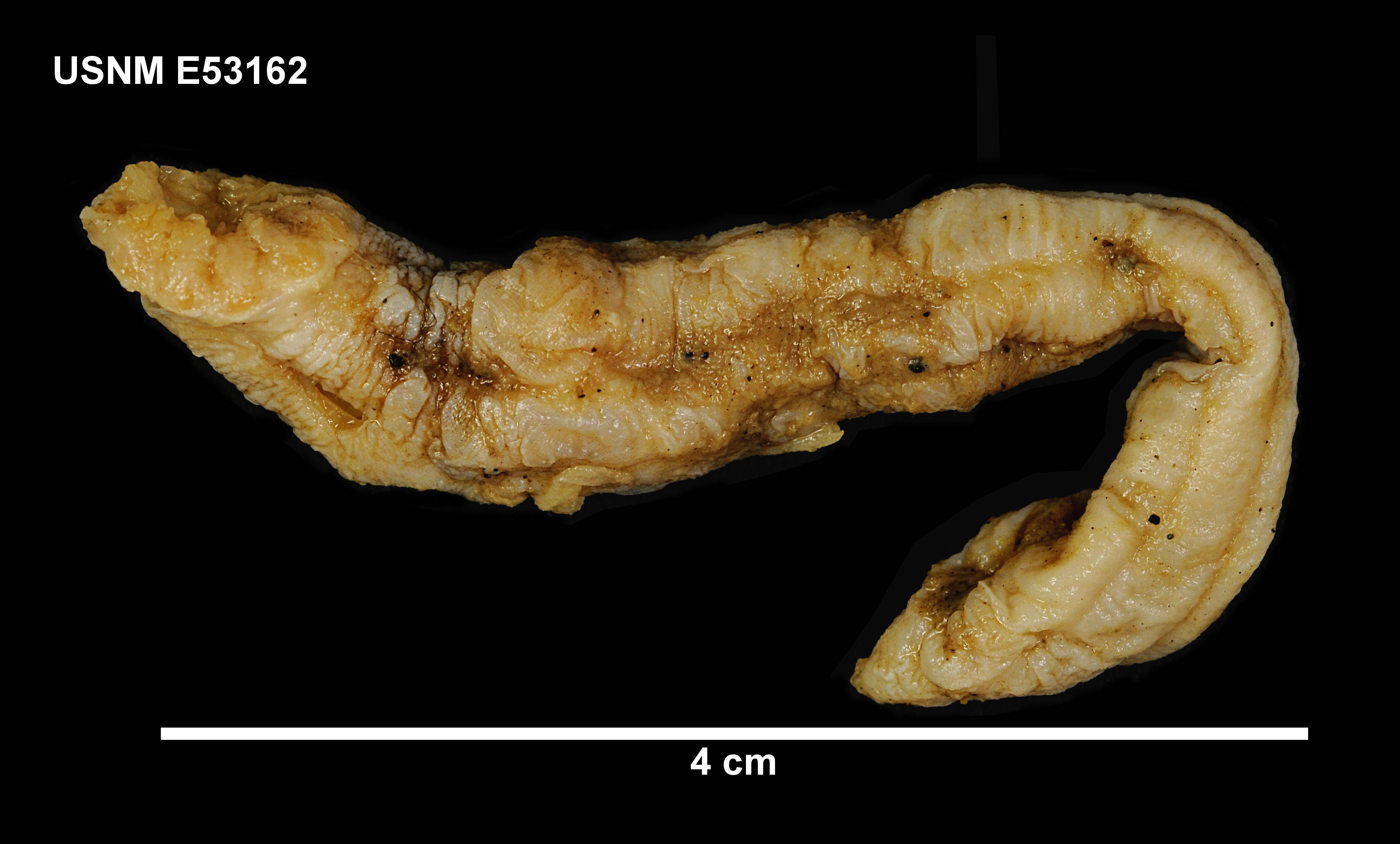
- Myriotrochus sp.

Scientific classification
- Kingdom: Animalia
- Phylum: Echinodermata
- Class: Holothuroidea
- Order: Apodida
- Family: Myriotrochidae
- Genus: Myriotrochus; Steenstrup, 1851

Species
- 18 extant, 1 extinct; see text

= Myriotrochus =

Genus of sea cucumbers

Myriotrochus is a genus of sea cucumbers in the family Myriotrochidae.

== Species ==
As of 2024, 19 species and one subgenus are recognized by the World Register of Marine Species:

- Myriotrochus ahearnae Pawson, Nizinski & Ames in Pawson et al., 2015
- Myriotrochus antarcticus Smirnov & Bardsley, 1997
- Myriotrochus eurycyclus Heding, 1935
- Myriotrochus giganteus Clark, 1920
- Myriotrochus hesperides O'Loughlin & Manjón-Cabeza, 2009
- Myriotrochus longissimus Belyaev, 1970
- Myriotrochus macquoriensis Belyaev & Mironov, 1981
- Myriotrochus mitis Belyaev, 1970
- Myriotrochus mitsukurii Ohshima, 1915
- Myriotrochus nikiae O'Loughlin & VandenSpiegel, 2010
- Myriotrochus rinkii Steenstrup, 1851
- Myriotrochus theeli Östergren, 1905

Subgenus Oligotrochus Sars, 1866

- Myriotrochus (Oligotrochus) bathybius Clark, 1920
- Myriotrochus (Oligotrochus) clarki Gage & Billett, 1986
- Myriotrochus (Oligotrochus) meteorensis Bohn, 2005
- Myriotrochus (Oligotrochus) neocaledonicus Smirnov, 1999
- Myriotrochus (Oligotrochus) rotulus Smirnov, 1999
- †Myriotrochus (Oligotrochus) smirnovi (Reich, 2002)
- Myriotrochus (Oligotrochus) vitreus (Sars M, 1866)
