= Anapta =

Scientific classification
- Kingdom: Animalia
- Phylum: Echinodermata
- Class: Holothuroidea
- Order: Apodida
- Family: Synaptidae
- Genus: Anapta; Semper, 1867

Species
- See text

Genus of sea cucumbers

Anapta is a genus of sea cucumbers in the family Synaptidae.

== Species ==
The following species are recognised in the genus Anapta:

- Anapta fallax Lampert, 1889
- Anapta gracilis Semper, 1867
- Anapta subtilis Sluiter, 1887
