= Trochoderma =

Scientific classification
- Kingdom: Animalia
- Phylum: Echinodermata
- Class: Holothuroidea
- Order: Apodida
- Family: Myriotrochidae
- Genus: Trochoderma; Théel, 1877
- Species: T. elegans

Binomial name
- Trochoderma elegans Théel, 1877

Genus of sea cucumbers

Trochoderma is a genus of sea cucumbers. It is monotypic, with a single species Trochoderma elegans.
