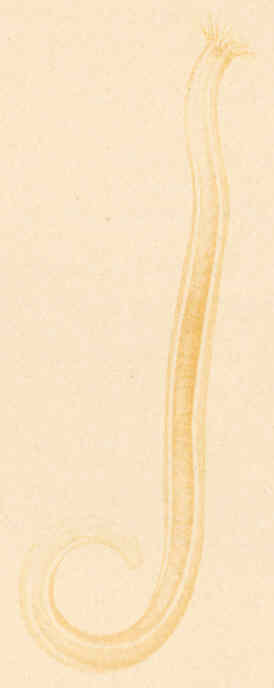

Scientific classification
- Kingdom: Animalia
- Phylum: Echinodermata
- Class: Holothuroidea
- Order: Apodida
- Family: Synaptidae
- Genus: Leptosynapta
- Species: L. inhaerens

Binomial name
- Leptosynapta inhaerens O.F. Müller, 1776

= Leptosynapta inhaerens =

Species of sea cucumber

Leptosynapta inhaerens is a marine species of sea cucumber that lives buried in the sand on shores.

== Description ==
This species of holothurian is pink, with a slender and soft body. It can reach 30 cm long. Its body is sticky, hence its species name inhaerens .

== Distribution ==
It can be found on the south and west coasts of Britain, and between Norway and Brittany.

== Habitat ==
L. inhaerens lives buried in sand or mud on the lower shore.

== Ecology ==
This species is psammivorous, which means it digests organic matter from the sand.
