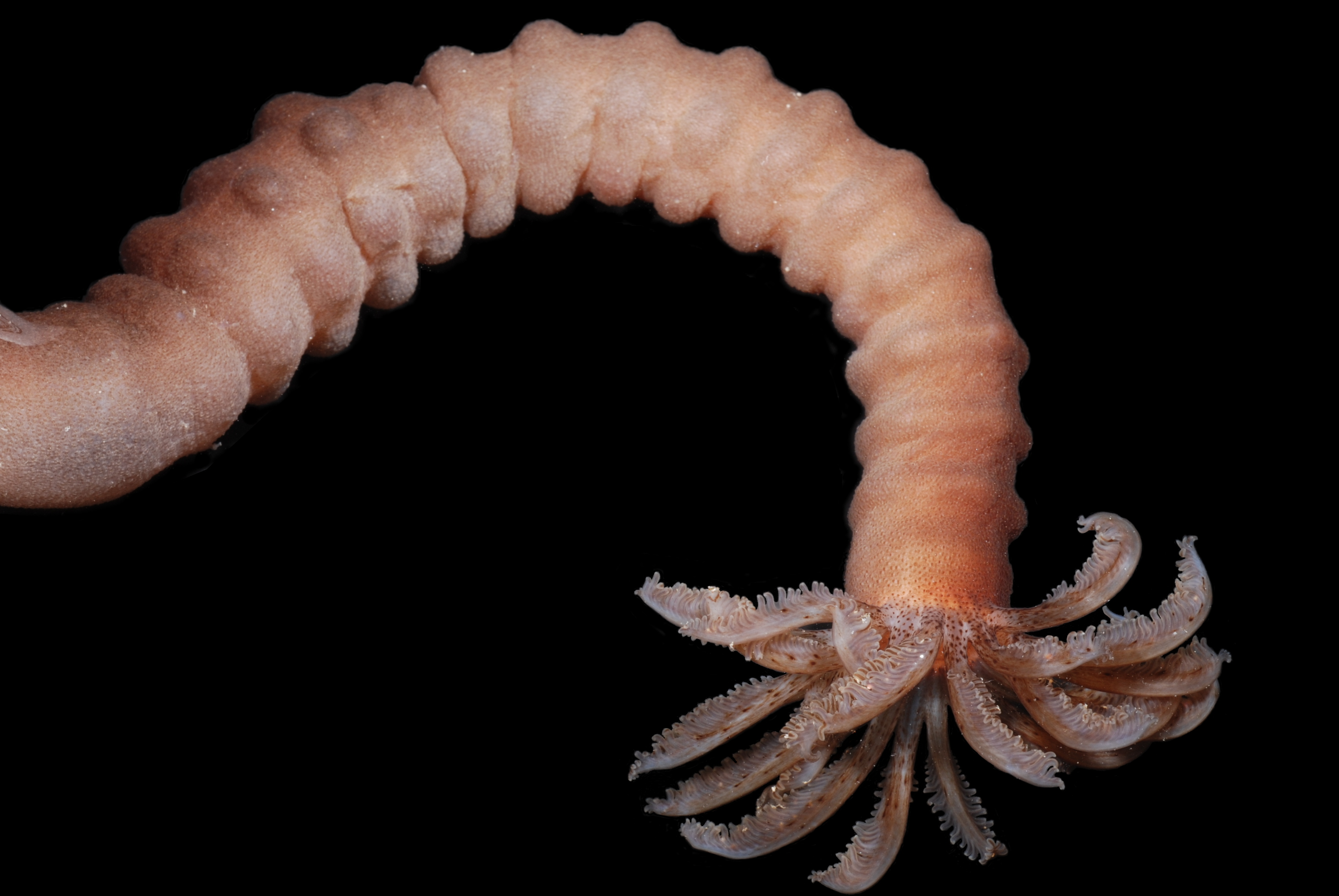
- Polyplectana kefersteinii

Scientific classification
- Kingdom: Animalia
- Phylum: Echinodermata
- Class: Holothuroidea
- Order: Apodida
- Family: Synaptidae
- Genus: Polyplectana; Clark, 1908

Species
- See text

= Polyplectana =

Genus of sea cucumbers

Polyplectana is a genus of sea cucumbers in the family Synaptidae. The type species is Polyplectana kefersteinii.

== Species ==
The World Register of Marine Species lists the following species :

- Polyplectana galatheae Heding, 1928
- Polyplectana grisea Heding, 1931
- Polyplectana kallipeplos (Sluiter, 1887)
- Polyplectana kefersteinii (Selenka, 1867)
- Polyplectana longogranula Heding, 1928
- Polyplectana nigra (Semper, 1867)
- Polyplectana oculata Heding, 1928
- Polyplectana samoae Heding, 1928
- Polyplectana sluiteri Heding, 1928
- Polyplectana tahitiensis Heding, 1928
- Polyplectana unispicula Heding, 1931
- Polyplectana zamboangae Heding, 1928
