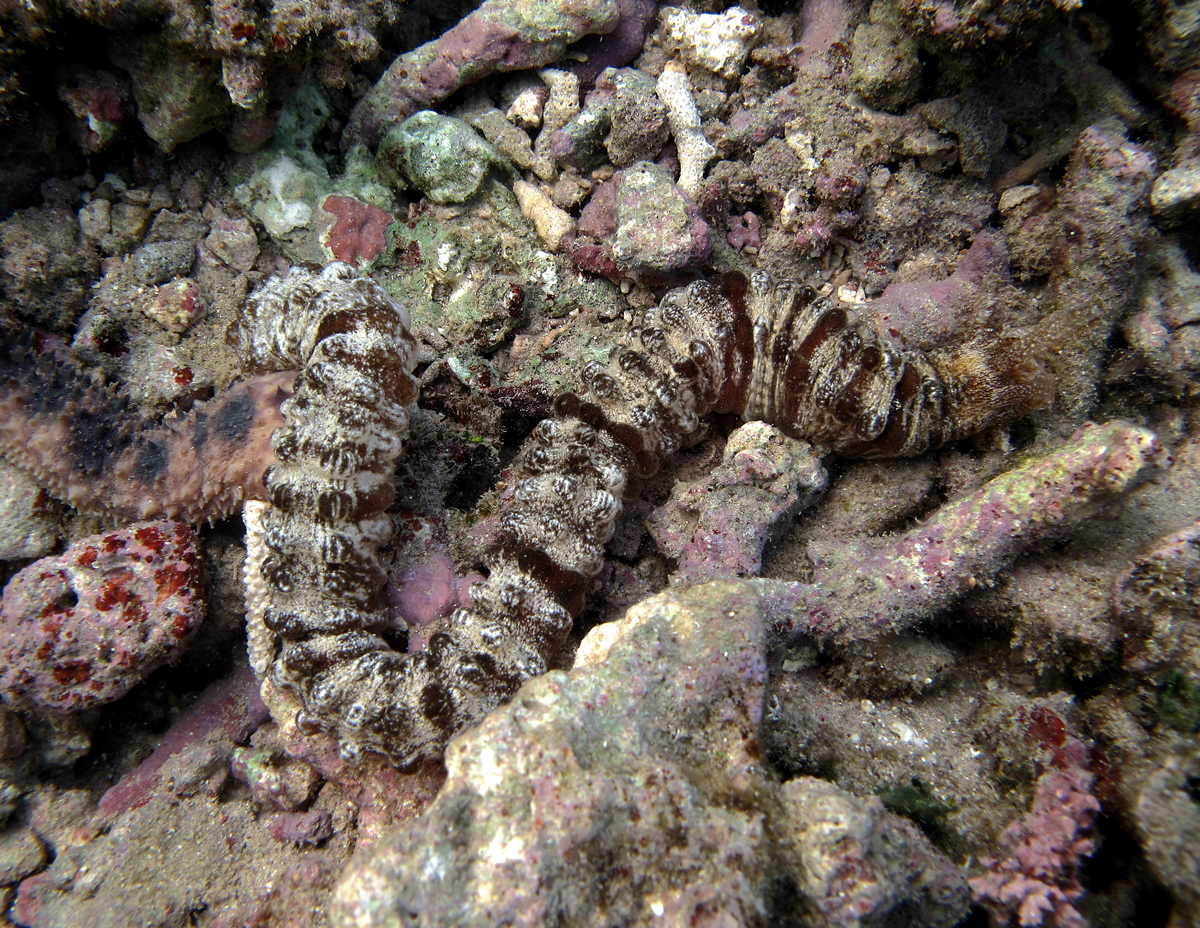
- Opheodesoma grisea

Scientific classification
- Kingdom: Animalia
- Phylum: Echinodermata
- Class: Holothuroidea
- Order: Apodida
- Family: Synaptidae
- Genus: Opheodesoma; Fisher, 1907

Species
- See text

= Opheodesoma =

Genus of sea cucumbers

Opheodesoma is a genus of sea cucumbers in the family Synaptidae.

== Species ==
The World Register of Marine Species lists the following species :

- Opheodesoma australiensis Heding, 1931
- Opheodesoma clarki Heding, 1928
- Opheodesoma glabra (Semper, 1867)
- Opheodesoma grisea (Semper, 1867)
- Opheodesoma lineata Heding, 1928
- Opheodesoma radiosa (Lesson, 1830)
- Opheodesoma serpentina (J. Müller, 1850)
- Opheodesoma sinevirga Cherbonnier, 1988
- Opheodesoma spectabilis Fisher, 1907
- Opheodesoma variabilis Heding, 1928
