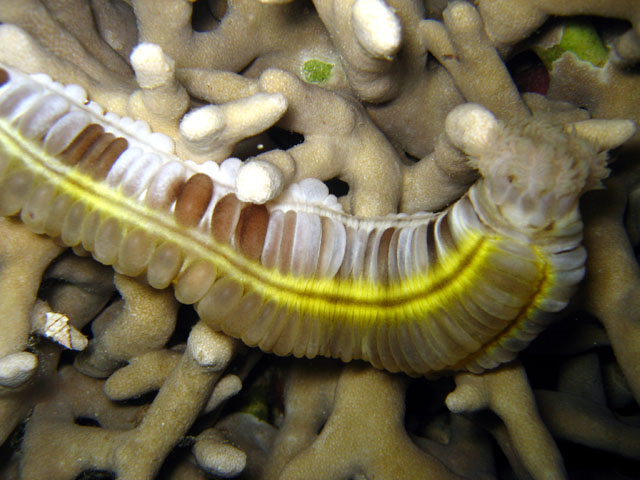

Scientific classification
- Kingdom: Animalia
- Phylum: Echinodermata
- Class: Holothuroidea
- Order: Apodida
- Family: Synaptidae
- Genus: Euapta; Östergren, 1898

Species
- See text

= Euapta =

Genus of sea cucumbers

Euapta is a genus of sea cucumbers in the family Synaptidae.

== Species ==
The World Register of Marine Species lists the following species :

- Euapta godeffroyi (Semper, 1868)
- Euapta lappa (J. Müller, 1850)
- Euapta magna Heding, 1928
- Euapta tahitiensis Cherbonnier, 1955
