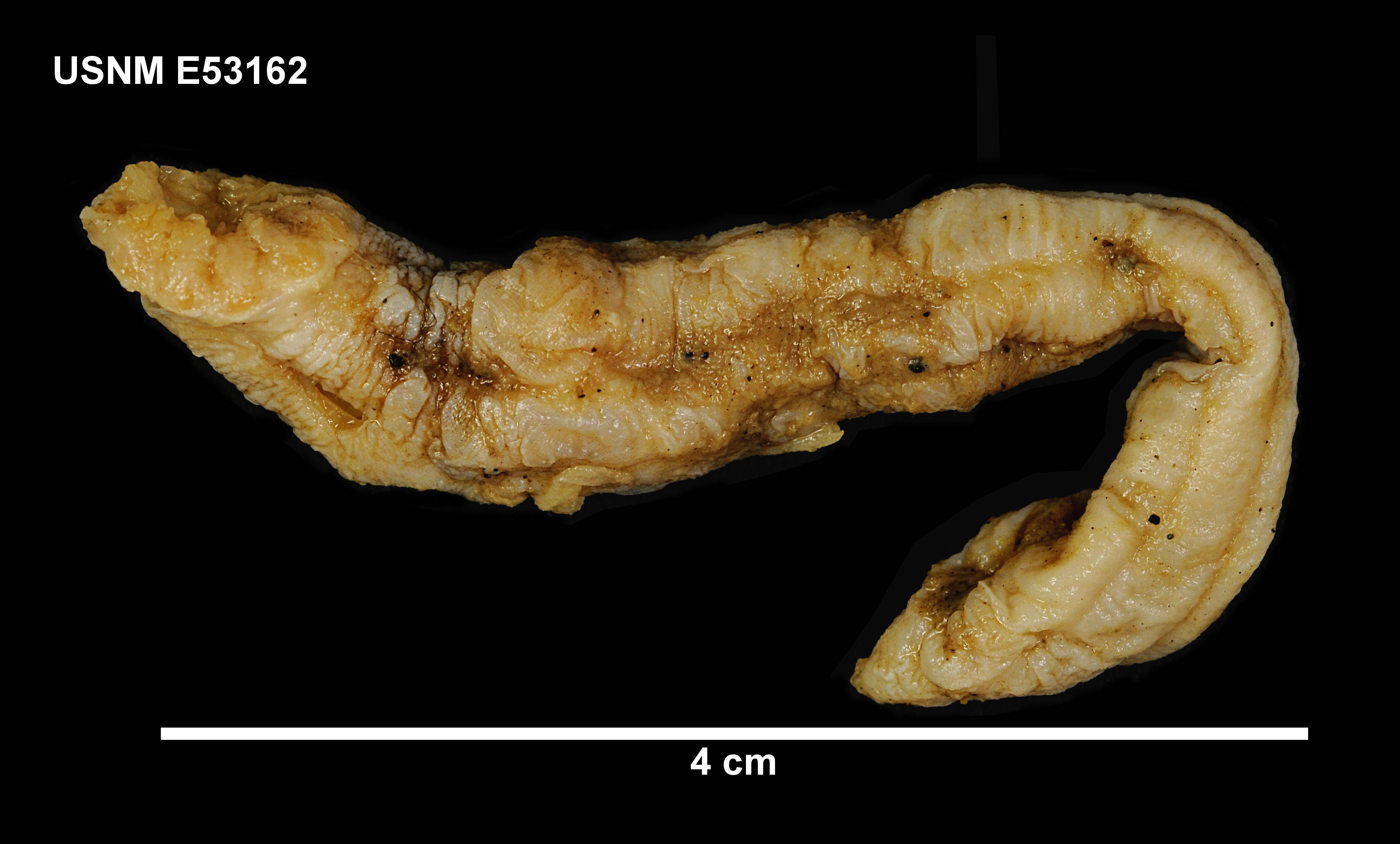
- Myriotrochus sp.

Scientific classification
- Kingdom: Animalia
- Phylum: Echinodermata
- Class: Holothuroidea
- Order: Apodida
- Family: Myriotrochidae; Théel, 1877

Genera
- see text

= Myriotrochidae =

Family of sea cucumbers

Myriotrochidae is a family of sea cucumbers.

== Description and characteristics ==
Members of this family have digitate tentacles, bearing 2-8 digits on each side. They lack podia, radial canals and respiratory tree.

The soft body wall is supported by ossicles which are generally wheel-shaped with 8 or more spokes.

They are abyssal sea cucumbers, and may be the deepest-living group of echinoderms : species of the genera Myriotrochus and Prototrochus (such as Prototrochus bruuni) have been identified down to 10,687 m (35,062 ft) deep.

== List of genera ==
The following genera are recognised in the family Myriotrochidae:

- Acanthotrochus Danielssen & Koren, 1881 -- 3 species
- Achiridota Clark, 1908 -- 3 species
- †Hemisphaeranthos Terquem & Berthelin, 1875 -- 4 species
- Myriotrochus Steenstrup, 1851 -- 19 species
- Neolepidotrochus Bohn, 2005 -- 5 species
- Parvotrochus Gage & Billett, 1986 -- 1 species
- Prototrochus Belyaev & Mironov, 1982 -- 17 species
- Siniotrochus Pawson, 1971 -- 3 species
- Trochoderma Théel, 1877 -- 1 species
