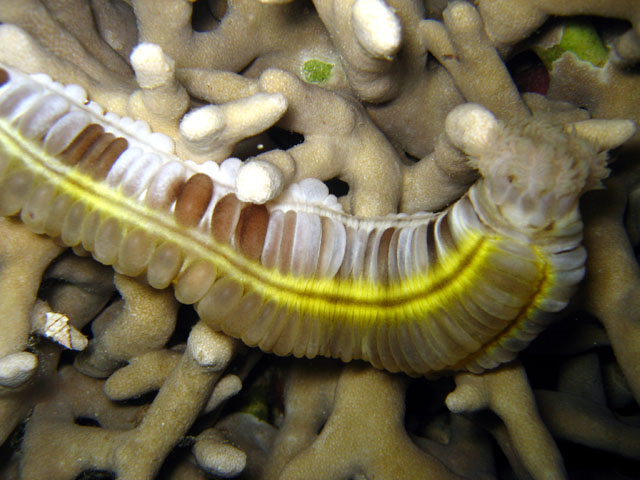

Scientific classification
- Kingdom: Animalia
- Phylum: Echinodermata
- Class: Holothuroidea
- Order: Apodida
- Family: Synaptidae
- Genus: Euapta
- Species: E. godeffroyi

Binomial name
- Euapta godeffroyi (Semper, 1868)

Synonyms
- Synapta godeffroyi Semper, 1868

= Euapta godeffroyi =

Species of sea cucumber

Euapta godeffroyi, the sticky snake sea cucumber, is a species of sea cucumber in the family Synaptidae. It is found on coral reefs in the tropical Indo-Pacific region.

== Description ==
E. godeffroyi is a long, slender sea cucumber growing to a length of about 40 cm (16 in). A ring of fifteen feathery tentacles encircle the mouth. The body colour is creamy white with blotches of grey and a pair of longitudinal brown or greenish stripes. The spicules (microscopic calcareous structures that project through the skin) are a mixture of anchors and perforated plates with large holes.

== Distribution and habitat ==
E. godeffroyi is native to the tropical Indo-Pacific region. Its range extends from the Red Sea and Madagascar to Hawaii and Easter Island, and includes Indonesia, the Philippines, northern Australia and New Caledonia. It occurs at depths down to about 77 m (253 ft) in tidal pools, among stones and on sand. It also occurs among rubble on the upper parts and slopes of reefs.

== Ecology ==
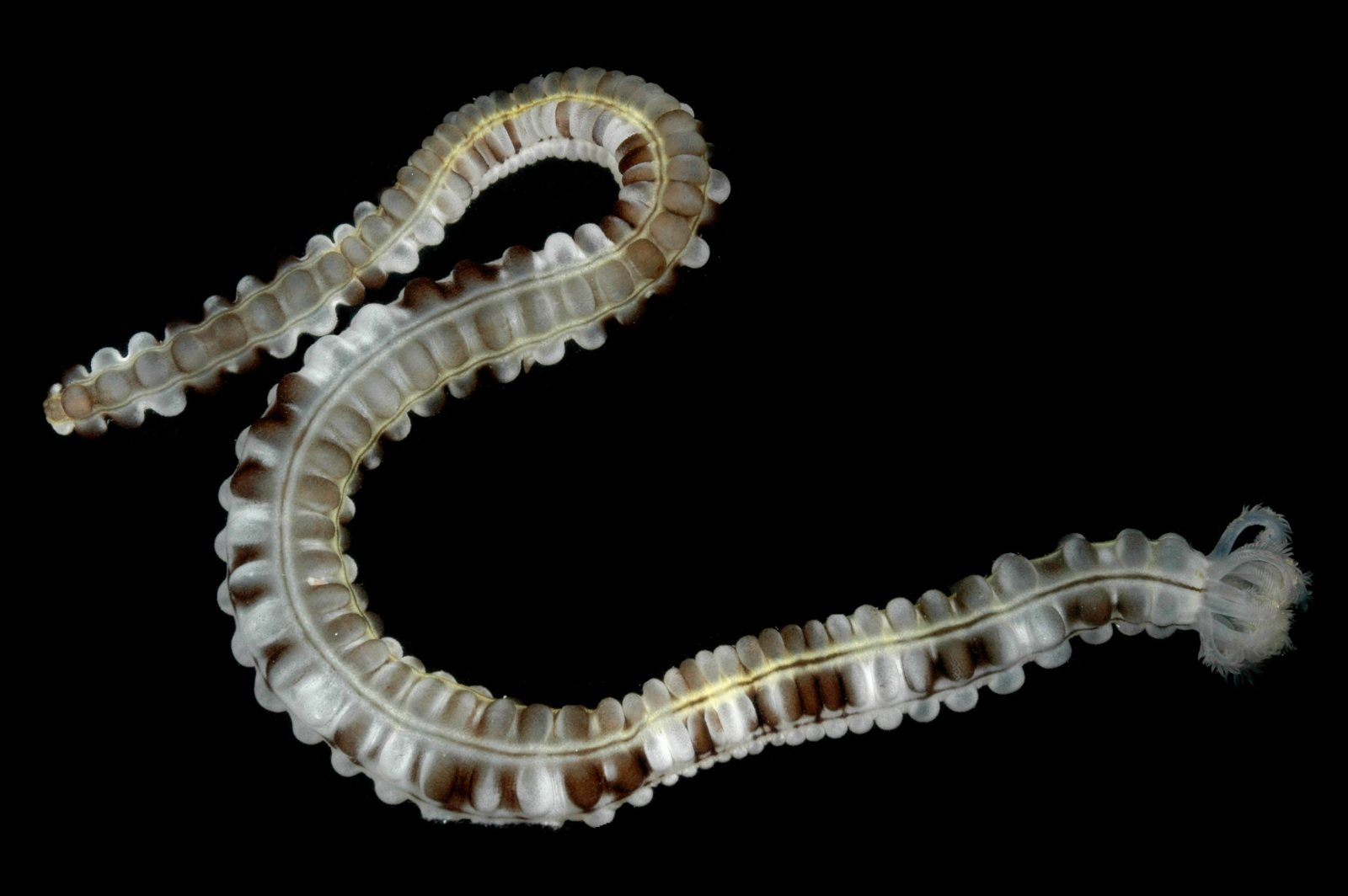
E. godeffroyi

E. godeffroyi is nocturnal and is a deposit feeder. It spends the day hidden among the rubble and corals. It emerges at night, crawling along using its anchor spicules for adhesion, and extending its tentacles onto the sediment which sticks to them; food particles are passed to the mouth where they are scraped off. The sea cucumber selects the more nutritious particles it finds and consumes several times its bodyweight each day.
