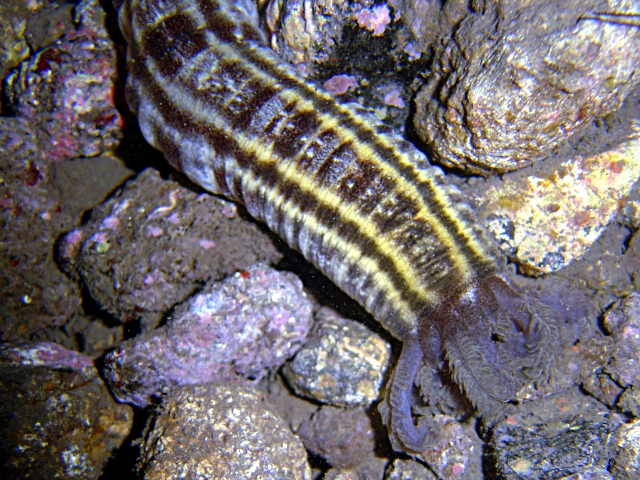
- Anterior end of beaded sea cucumber

Scientific classification
- Kingdom: Animalia
- Phylum: Echinodermata
- Class: Holothuroidea
- Order: Apodida
- Family: Synaptidae
- Genus: Euapta
- Species: E. lappa

Binomial name
- Euapta lappa (J. Müller, 1850)

= Euapta lappa =

Species of sea cucumber

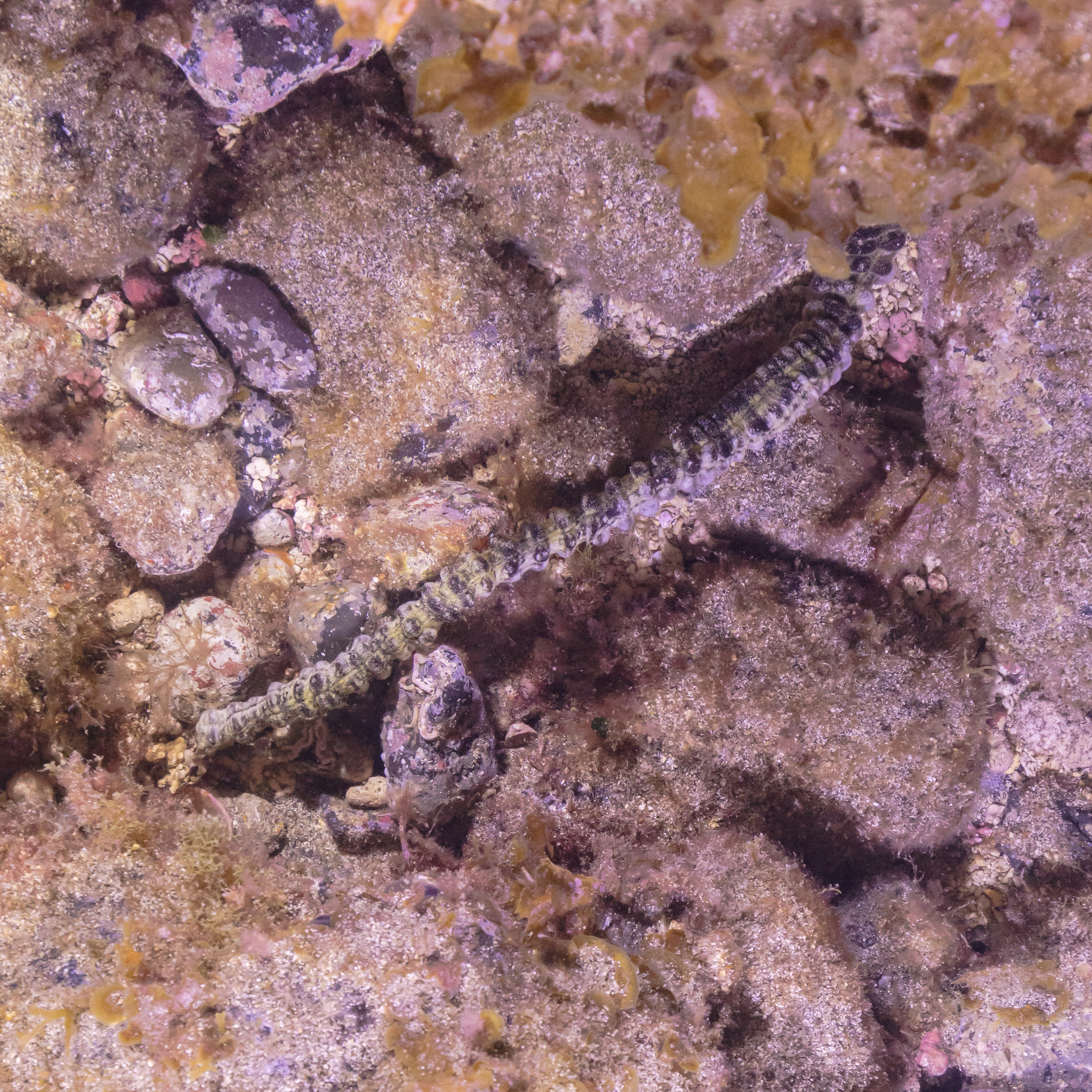
View of the body

Euapta lappa, the beaded sea cucumber, is a species of sea cucumbers in the family Synaptidae in the phylum Echinodermata. It is found on coral reefs in the Caribbean region.

== Description ==
In appearance, the beaded sea cucumber resembles a long worm rather than a sea cucumber. It can reach up to a metre (yard) in length and has a diameter of up to 4 cm (1.6 in). It lengthens and shortens repeatedly and when disturbed, the normally flaccid body retracts vigorously to a fraction of its original length. It has no internal respiratory tree, nor does it have tube feet, and the body surface is covered by rounded ridges. The skeletal structure consists of many tiny calcareous plates embedded in the cuticle. Little hooks project from these ossicles and make the body feel sticky to the touch. At the anterior (front) of the animal there is a ring of fifteen branched feeding tentacles. The body colour is pale brown or grey, often with white flecks or darker, longitudinal streaks and transverse banding.

== Distribution and habitat ==
The beaded sea cucumber is found in the Caribbean Sea, the Bahamas, Jamaica, Cuba, the Gulf of Mexico, Mexico, Costa Rica, Panama and the Lesser Antilles. It is also known from the Canary Islands. It is found on reefs at depths down to about 30 metres (98 ft), hiding during the day among boulders and coral debris.

== Biology ==
The beaded sea cucumber is a detritivore. It uses its tentacles to sift through sediment on the seabed, pushing it into its mouth aperture. The organic material in the sediment is digested and the inorganic matter is expelled through the cloacal vent.

Locomotion takes place as a result of contraction of muscles in the body wall. These consist of both longitudinal bands of muscle and continuous circular bands forming a tube. The contraction of different regions of musculature enables the sea cucumber to move around as waves of peristalsis pass along the body. The ossicles prevent slipping by providing friction with the substrate. In an aquarium, this sea cucumber can climb the vertical glass side by using peristalsis in this way, with the only point of attachment being the tentacles.
