= Ossicle (echinoderm) =

Anatomical feature of echinoderms

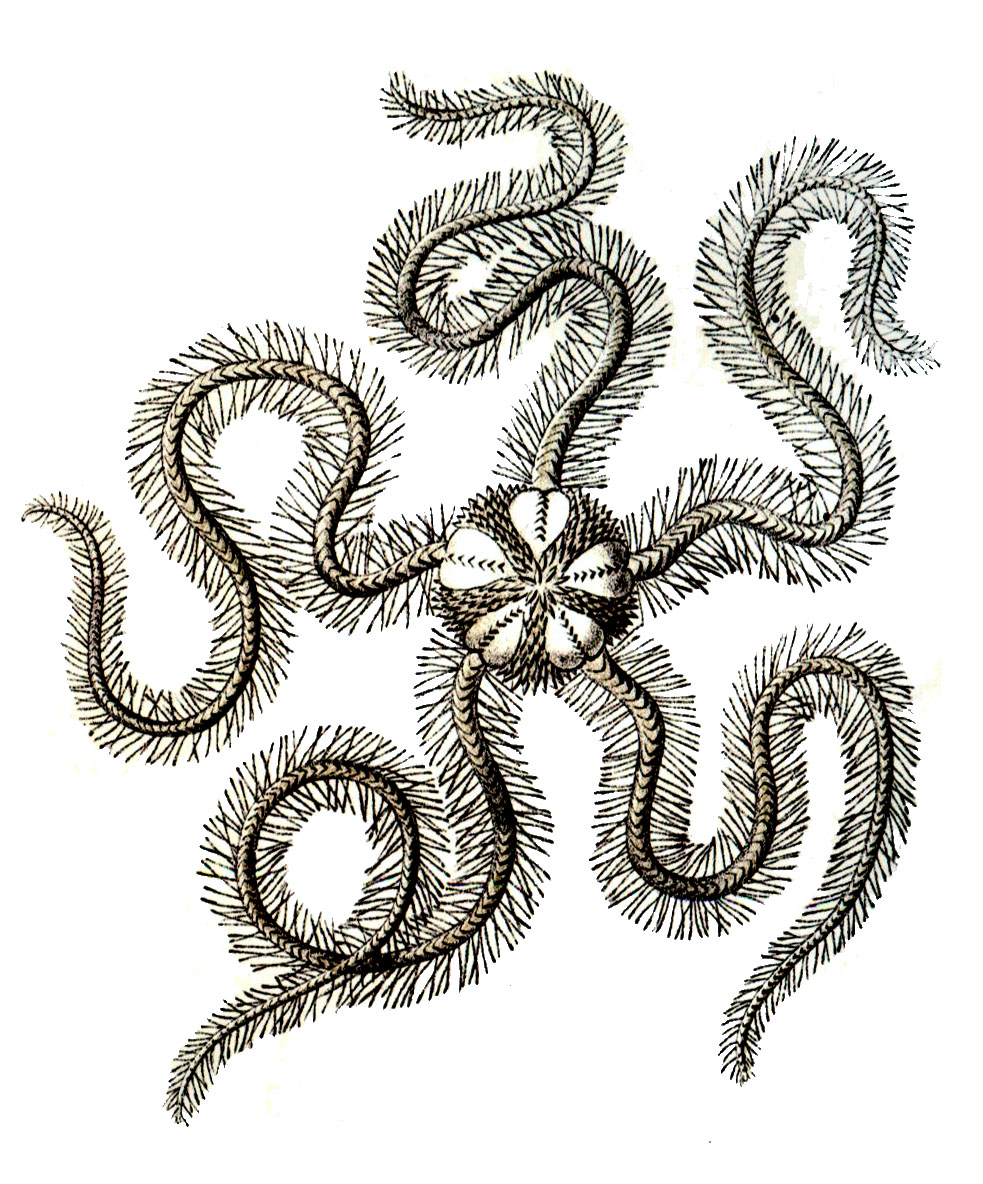
Ernst Haeckel's drawing of a brittle star (Ophiothrix fragilis) showing spines and articulated arms

Ossicles are small calcareous elements embedded in the dermis of the body wall of echinoderms. They form part of the endoskeleton and provide rigidity and protection. They are found in different forms and arrangements in sea urchins, starfish, brittle stars, sea cucumbers, and crinoids. The ossicles and spines (which are specialised sharp ossicles) are the only parts of the animal likely to be fossilized after an echinoderm dies.

== Formation ==
Ossicles are created intracellularly by specialised secretory cells known as sclerocytes in the dermis of the body wall of echinoderms. Each ossicle is composed of microcrystals of calcite arranged in a three-dimensional lattice known as a stereom. Under polarized light the ossicle behaves as if it were a single crystal because the axes of all the crystals are parallel. The space between the crystals is known as the stroma and allows entry to sclerocytes for enlargement and repair. The honeycomb structure is light but tough and collagenous ligaments connect the ossicles together. The ossicles are embedded in a tough connective tissue which is also part of the endoskeleton. When an ossicle becomes redundant, specialised cells known as phagocytes are able to reabsorb the calcareous material. All the ossicles, even those that protrude from the body wall, are covered by a thin layer of epidermis but functionally they act more like an exoskeleton than an endoskeleton.

== Types of ossicle ==
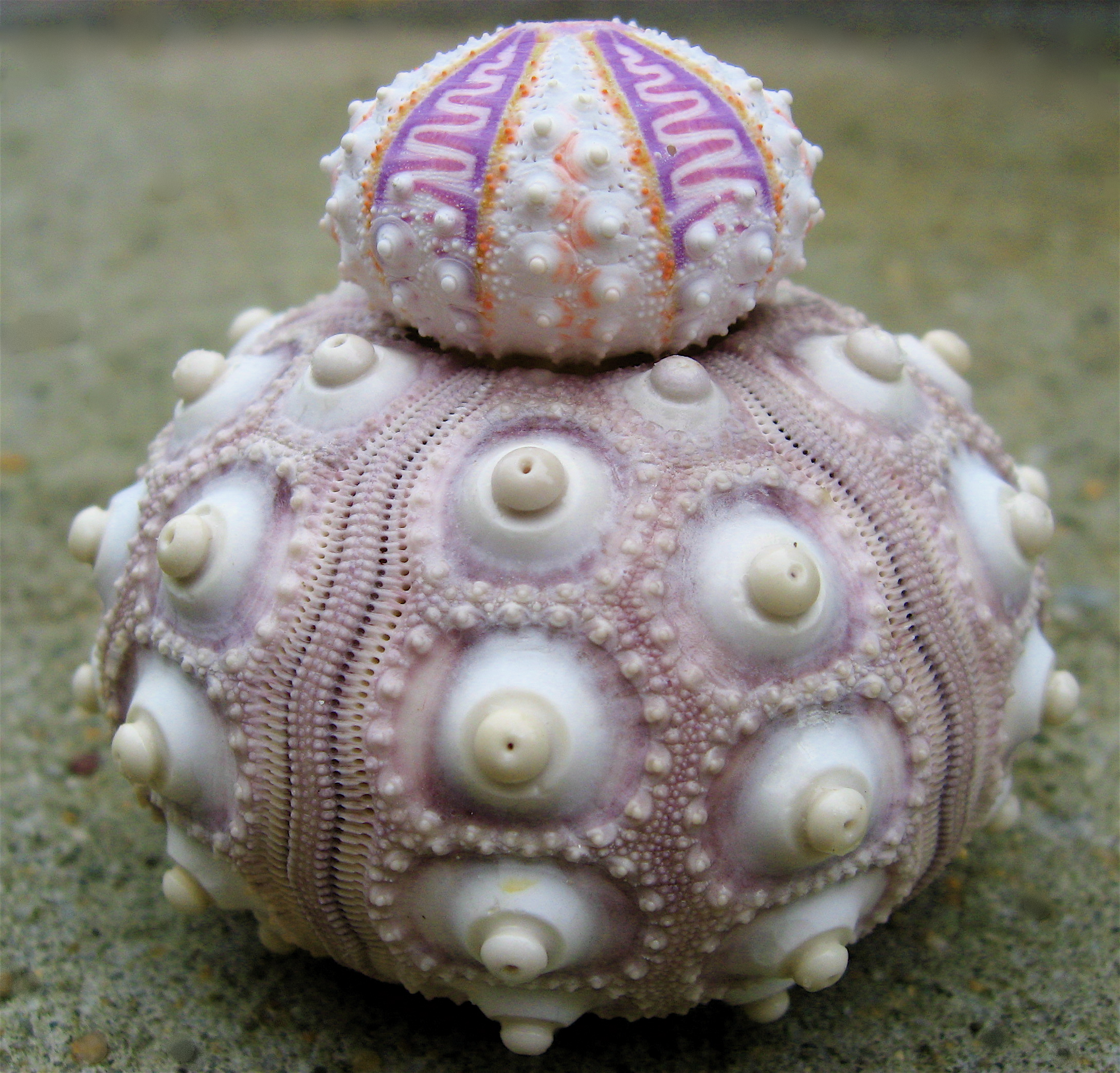
Sea urchin tests showing the ball parts of the ball and socket joints that articulate with the spines

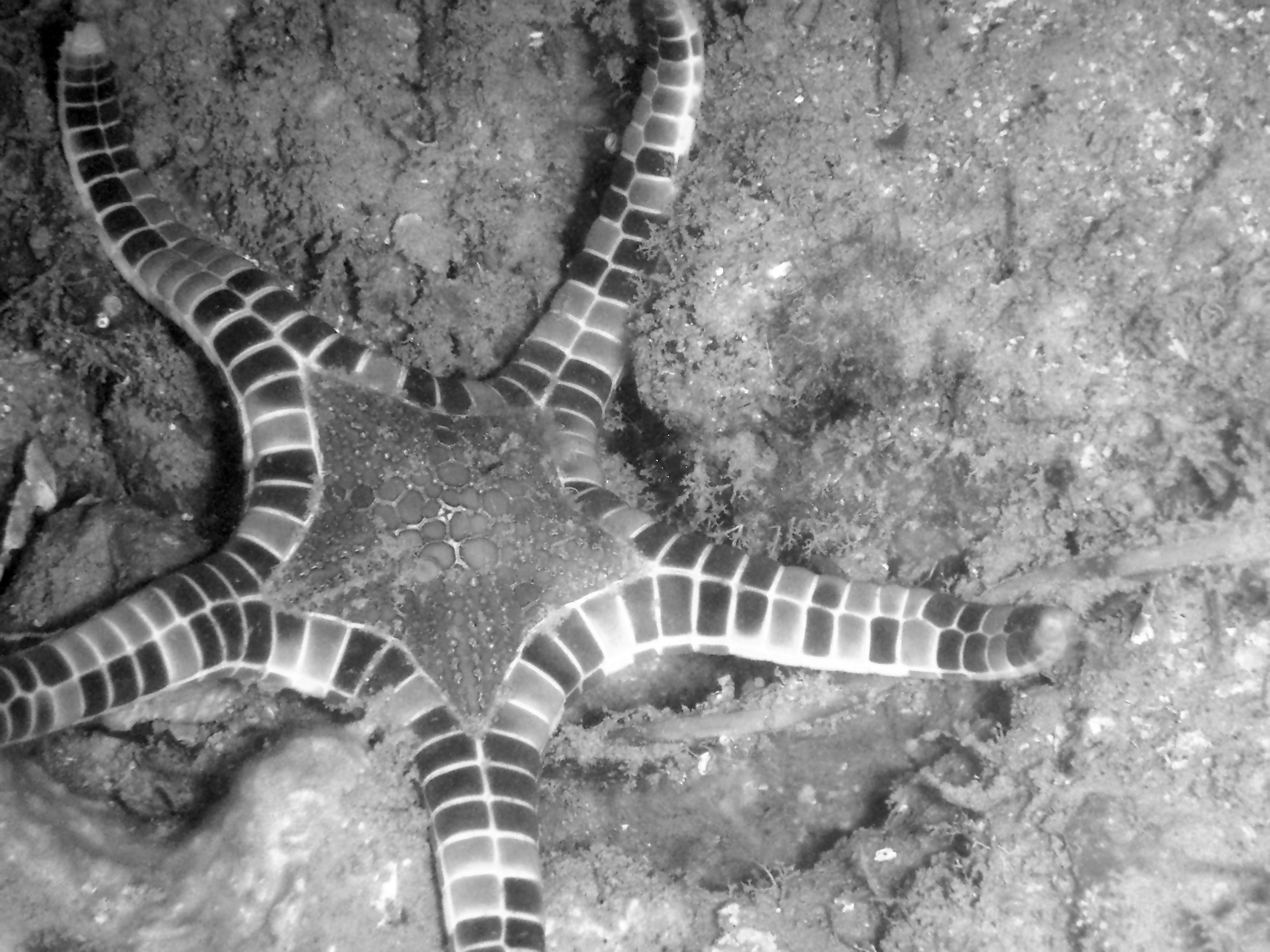
Iconaster longimanus, the icon seastar, showing plate ossicles

Ossicles have a variety of forms including flat plates, spines, rods and crosses, and specialised compound structures including pedicellariae and paxillae.

Plates are tabular ossicles that fit neatly together in a tessellated manner. They form the main skeletal covering for sea urchins and sea stars.

Spines are ossicles that project from the body wall and articulate with other ossicles through ball and socket joints mounted on tubercles. They are formed from crystals of calcite and can be solid or hollow, long or short, thick or thin and sharp or blunt. The spines serve a protective function and are also used for locomotion.

Pedicellariae are compound ossicles that articulate with other ossicles and protrude from the aboral (upper) surface of some sea stars (and also the test of sea urchins). They usually have short fleshy stalks and either two or three moveable ossicles forming a set of pincer-like jaws. They may be scattered over the surface or may be grouped around spines. Their function is to pick off debris so as to keep the surface clean and to prevent larvae of other invertebrates from settling and growing there.

Paxillae are small pillar-shaped ossicles with flat tops sometimes found covering the aboral surface of sea stars such as Luidia, Astropecten and Goniaster that live underneath sediment. Their stalks emerge from the body wall and their tops, each fringed with short spines, and abut each other to form a protective external false skin. Beneath this is a water-filled cavity which contains the madreporite and delicate gill structures known as papillae.

== Arrangement ==
Sea urchins are covered with plates which are usually fused together to give a rigid test, but in the order Echinothurioida, the test is leathery because the plates are separate. The test is divided into five segments that extend from the apex to the mouth. Each contains two ambulacral rows of plates alternating with two interambulacral rows. The ambulacral plates are each pierced by a pair of pores through which the active tube feet are connected to the water vascular system. Ossicles in the form of spines connect to tubercles on some of the plates. Sea urchins have several types of pedicellariae, some of which are toxic. A ring of specialised plates surround the aboral pole consisting of five genital plates, one of which is the madreporite, and five smaller ocular plates. Other large specialist plates surround the mouth in a set of jaws known as Aristotle's lantern.

Sea stars have separate plates giving flexibility to the disc and arms. They are arranged into interambulacral and ambulacral regions and the arms have an ambulacral groove on the underside from which the tube feet project. Other ossicles that may be present include pedicellariae and paxillae. There is often a large row of marginal plates adjoining the ambulacral groove, sometimes bearing spines.

Brittle stars do not have pedicellariae, and the plates that cover their surface are known as shields. On the arms these are in four rows with each segment having an aboral and oral shield and two lateral shields, usually with fringing spines. Other ossicles include spines, tubercles, small scales and vertebrae. The large central vertebrae in each arm segment provides the articulating element that joins it to the next.

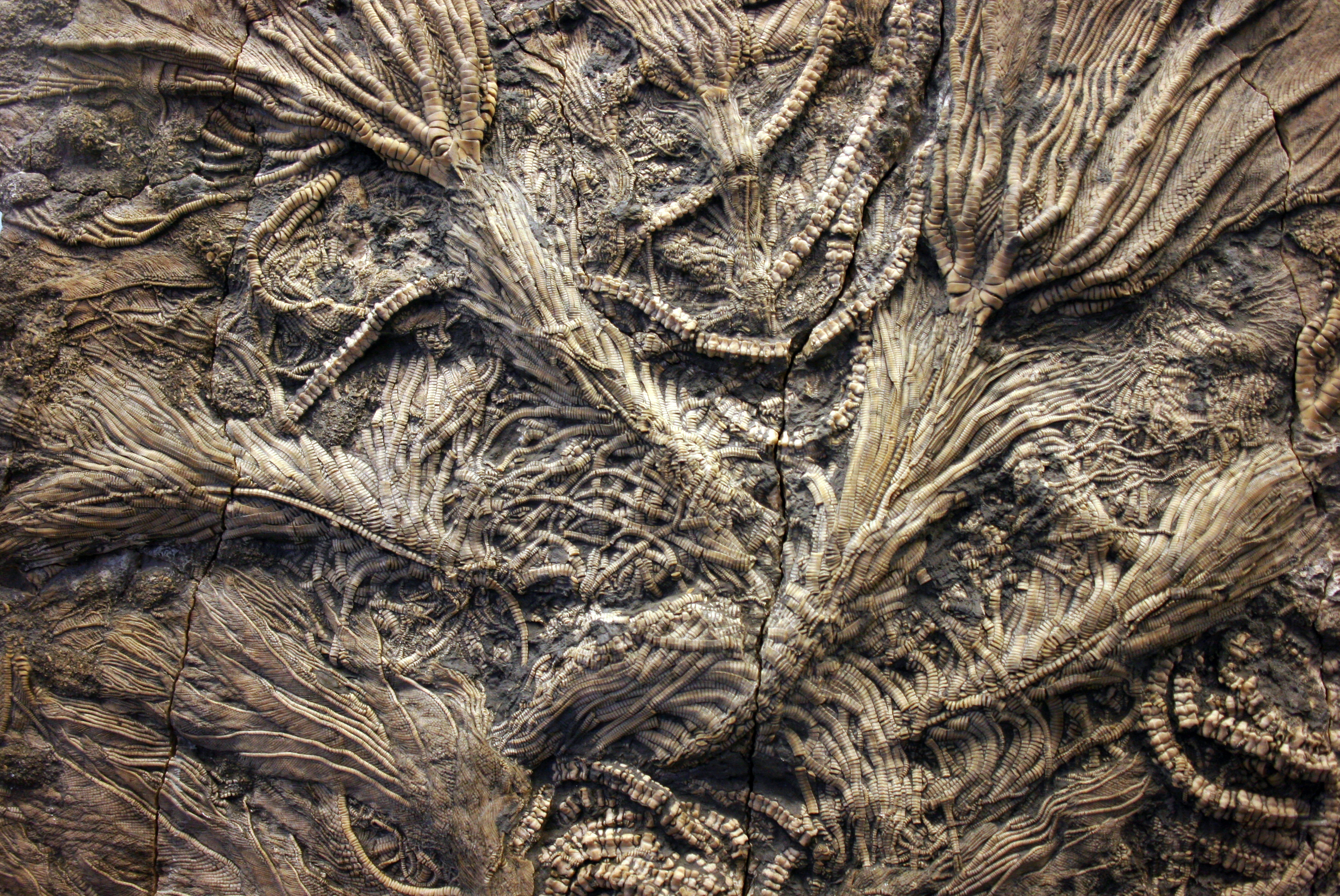
Crinoid fossils from the Jurassic showing ossicles

Several types of small ossicles are found in the body wall of sea cucumbers. Baskets are cup-shaped and usually have four projections. Buttons are disc-shaped and pierced by four holes and may be smooth or knobbed. Perforated plates are sieve-like and often widely distributed and rods provide support for the tube feet and tentacles. In the order Apodida, members of which lack tube feet, there are anchor-shaped ossicles attached to anchor plates. The flukes project from the body wall and provide traction.

Crinoids are supported by jointed stalks containing substantial compound ossicles. The crown has ossicles scattered throughout the connective tissue (crinoids have no distinct dermis). The arms contain columns of well-developed vertebrae-like ossicles. Each joint has limited movement but the whole arm can be coiled and uncoiled.

== Bibliography ==
- Ruppert, Edward E.; Fox, Richard, S.; Barnes, Robert D. (2004). Invertebrate Zoology, 7th edition. Cengage Learning. ISBN 81-315-0104-3.
