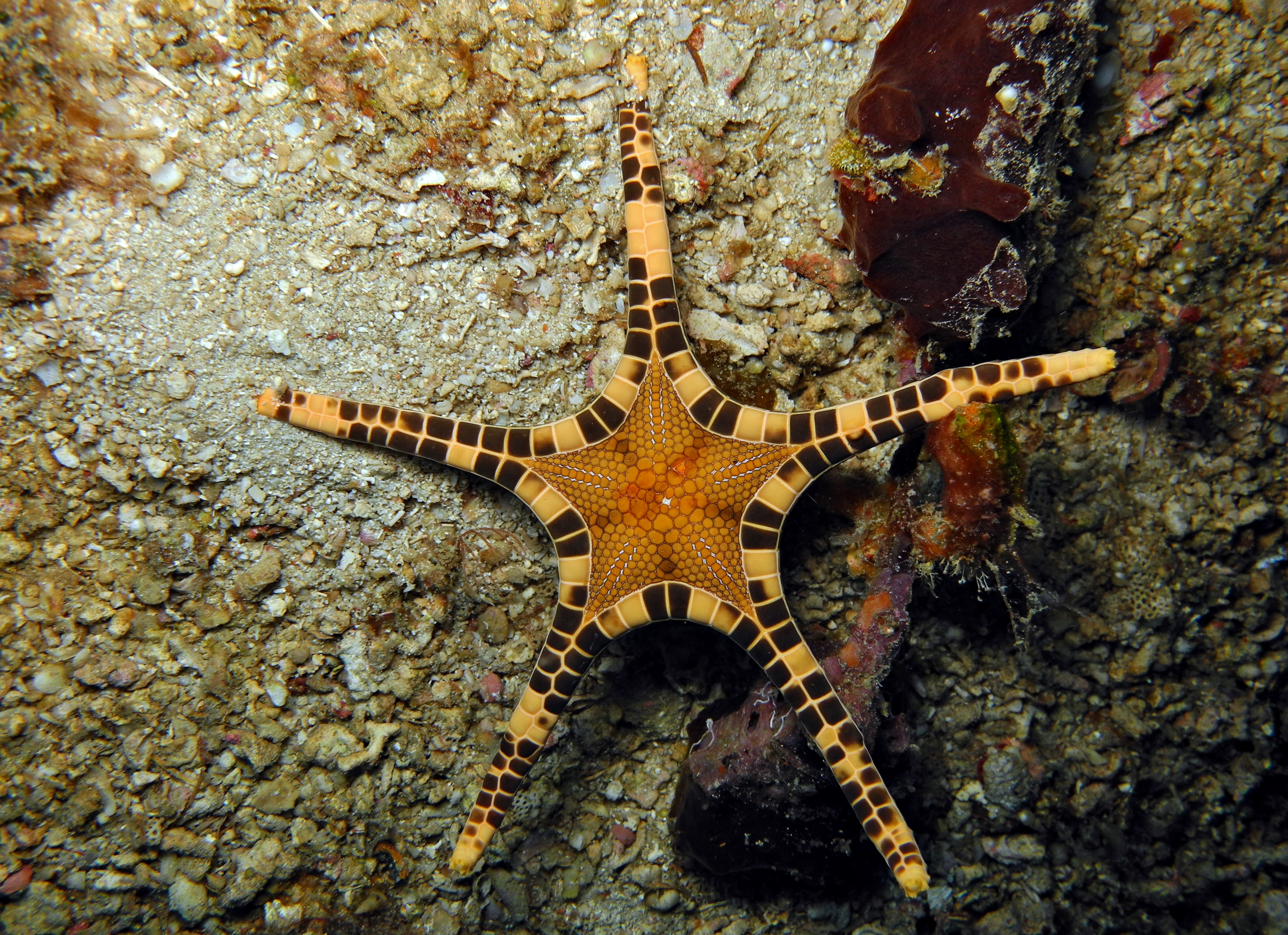
- Iconaster longimanus

Scientific classification
- Kingdom: Animalia
- Phylum: Echinodermata
- Class: Asteroidea
- Order: Valvatida
- Family: Goniasteridae
- Genus: Iconaster; Sladen, 1889

= Iconaster =

Genus of starfishes

Iconaster is a genus of echinoderms belonging to the family Goniasteridae.

The species of this genus are found in Australia and Malesia.

Species:

- Iconaster elegans Jangoux, 1981
- Iconaster longimanus (Möbius, 1859)
- Iconaster uchelbeluuensis Mah, 2005
- Iconaster vanuatuensis Mah, 2005
