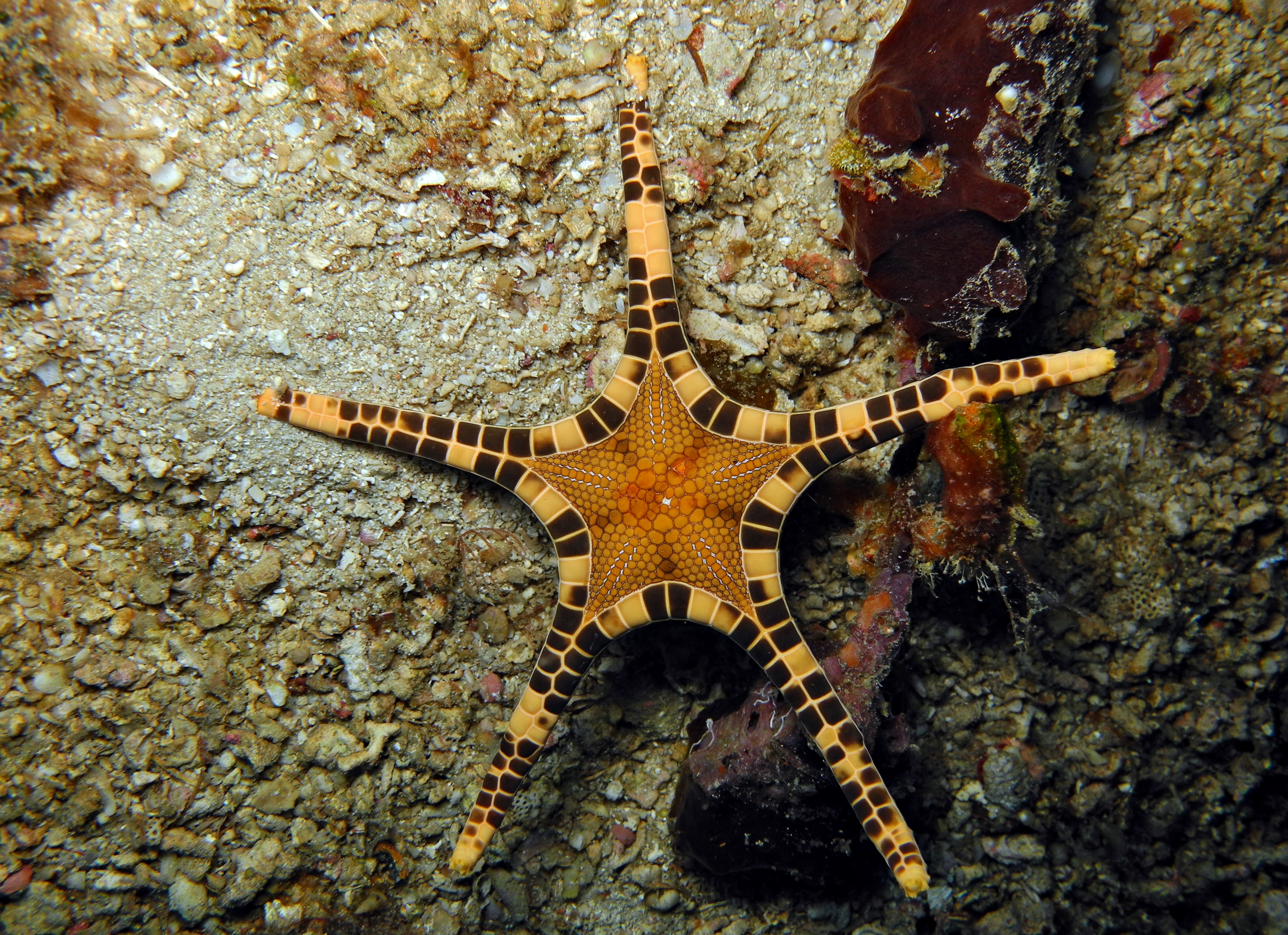

Scientific classification
- Kingdom: Animalia
- Phylum: Echinodermata
- Class: Asteroidea
- Order: Valvatida
- Family: Goniasteridae
- Genus: Iconaster
- Species: I. longimanus

Binomial name
- Iconaster longimanus (Mobius, 1859)

Synonyms
- Archaster lucifer Valenciennes, 1875; Astrogonium souleyeti Dujardin & Hupé, 1862; Dorigona longimana Gray, 1866; Goniaster longimanus Lutken, 1865; Pentagonaster longimanus Perrier, 1875

= Iconaster longimanus =

Species of starfish

Iconaster longimanus, the icon star or double star, is a species of starfish in the family Goniasteridae. It is found in the west and central Indo-Pacific Ocean. The genus name comes from the Greek eikon, meaning portrait or image and possibly referring to the way the marginal plates frame the disc, and aster, meaning star. The specific name comes from the Latin longus manus and refers to the long, slender arms.

== Description ==
Iconaster longimanus has five thin, tapering, flattened arms. It grows to a diameter of about 30 centimetres (12 in) with a central disc about 10 cm (4 in) across. It has a marginal row of large plates that resemble mosaic tiles and contrast in colour with the disc. The margin is usually tan with symmetrically arranged dark brown bands and the disc is orange-brown.

== Distribution ==
Iconaster longimanus is native to the tropical west and central Indo-Pacific Ocean. Its range includes south eastern Arabia, the Philippines, Singapore, Malaysia, the South China Sea, Indonesia and northern and western Australia. It is found at depths of between 6 and 85 metres (20 and 279 ft) in deep reef areas. It is common in Singapore where its typical habitat is lower reef slopes and adjoining areas of rubble where it feeds on lithophytes growing on rocks and coral fragments.

== Biology ==
Not a lot is known about the feeding habits of Iconaster longimanus but it is believed to include in its diet detritus, bacteria, micro-organisms and small benthic invertebrates.

This starfish produces large yolky eggs which develop directly into juvenile starfish without an intervening larval stage.
