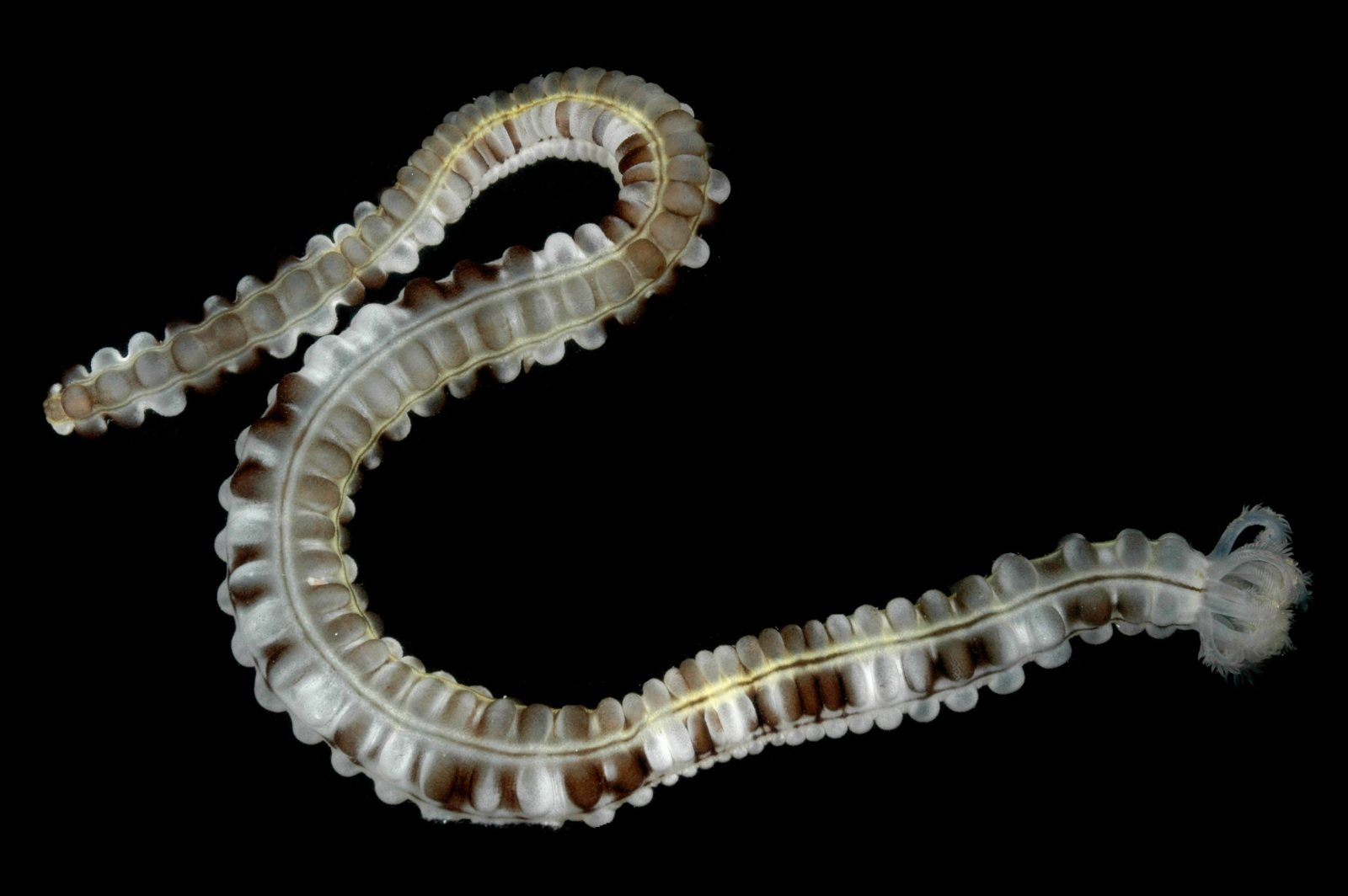
- Euapta godeffroyi

Scientific classification
- Kingdom: Animalia
- Phylum: Echinodermata
- Class: Holothuroidea
- Order: Apodida
- Family: Synaptidae; Burmeister, 1837

= Synaptidae =

Family of sea cucumbers

Synaptidae is a family of sea cucumbers that have no tube feet, tentacle ampullae, retractor muscles, respiratory trees, or cuvierian tubules. They also lack radial canals of the water-vascular system, with only the circumoral ring present.

Synaptids have elongated bodies, and their size varies significantly from small to quite large. Synapta maculata grows to two metres in length. They are quite active, moving by means of waves of peristaltic contractions. Their tegument is somewhat sticky because of the anchor-like spicules that project through the skin.

== Genera ==
According to World Register of Marine Species:

- Anapta Semper, 1867 -- 3 species
- Dactylapta Clark, 1908 -- 1 species
- †Eoleptosynapta Reich in Reich & Ansorge, 2014 -- 1 species
- †Eorynkatorpa Reich in Reich & Ansorge, 2014 -- 1 species
- Epitomapta Heding, 1928 -- 3 species
- Euapta Östergren, 1898 -- 4 species
- Eupatinapta Heding, 1928 -- 2 species
- Labidoplax Östergren, 1898 -- 5 species
- Leptosynapta Verrill, 1867 -- 33 species
- Oestergrenia Heding, 1931 -- 9 species
- Opheodesoma Fisher, 1907 -- 10 species
- Patinapta Heding, 1928 -- 6 species
- Polyplectana Clark, 1908 -- 12 species
- Protankyra Östergren, 1898 -- 37 species
- Rhabdomolgus Keferstein, 1862 -- 1 species
- Rynkatorpa Rowe & Pawson, 1967 -- 13 species
- Synapta Eschscholtz, 1829 -- 2 species
- Synaptula Örstedt, 1849 -- 29 species

== Gallery ==
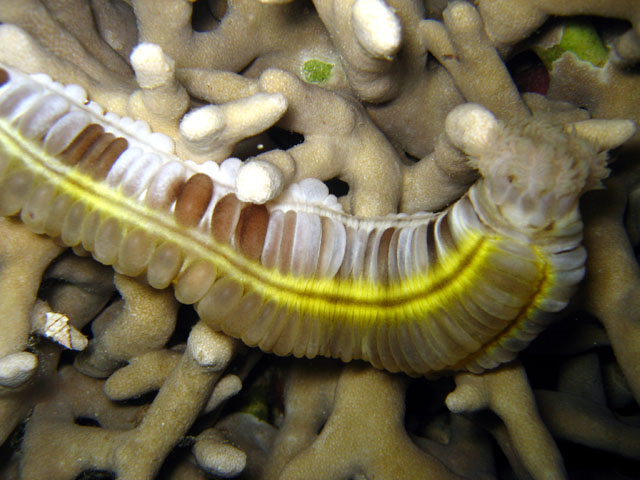
Euapta godeffroyi

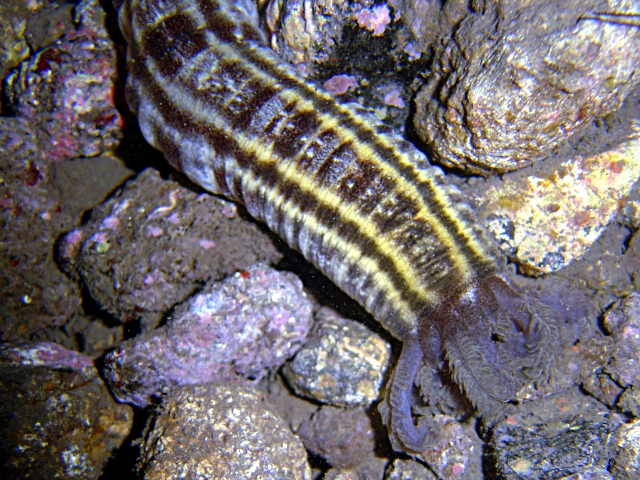
Euapta lappa

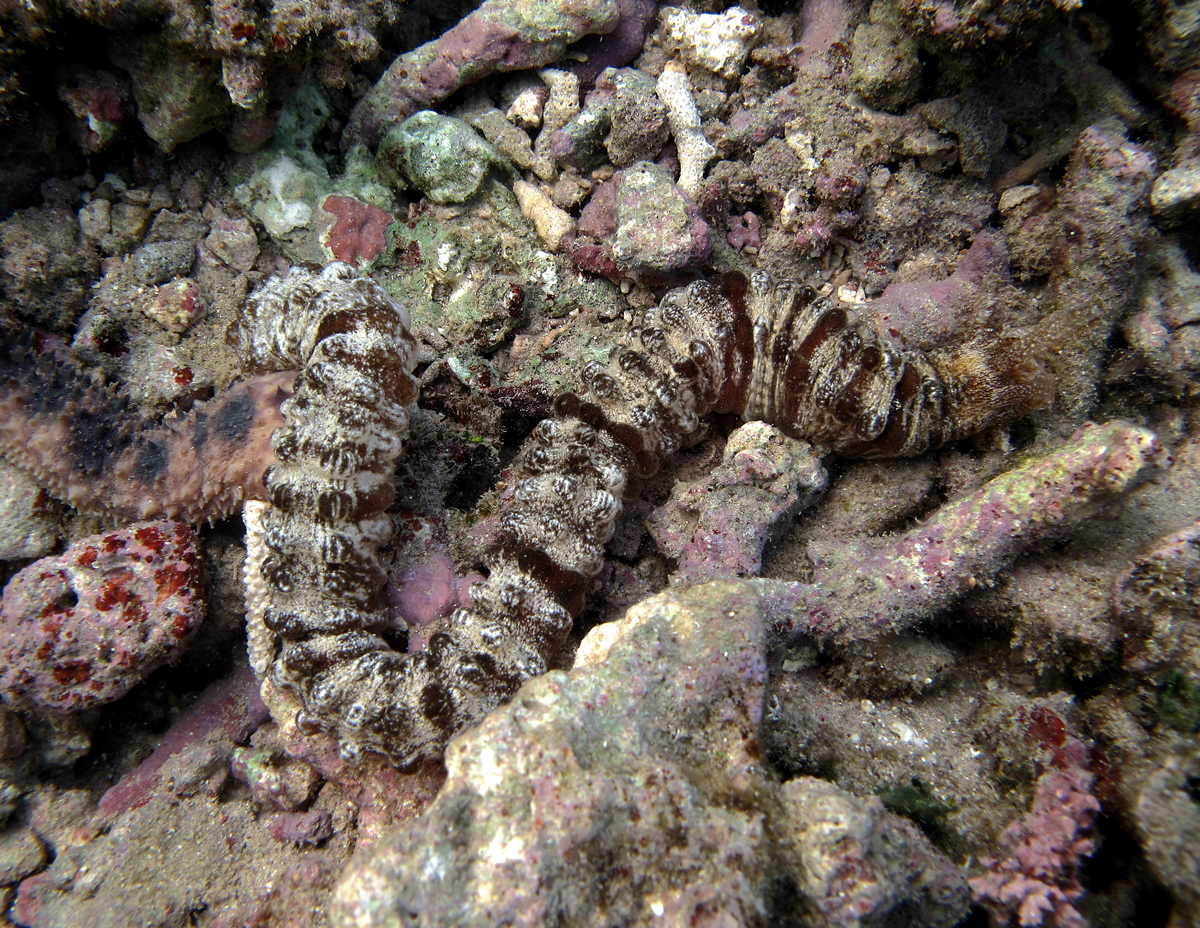
Opheodesoma grisea

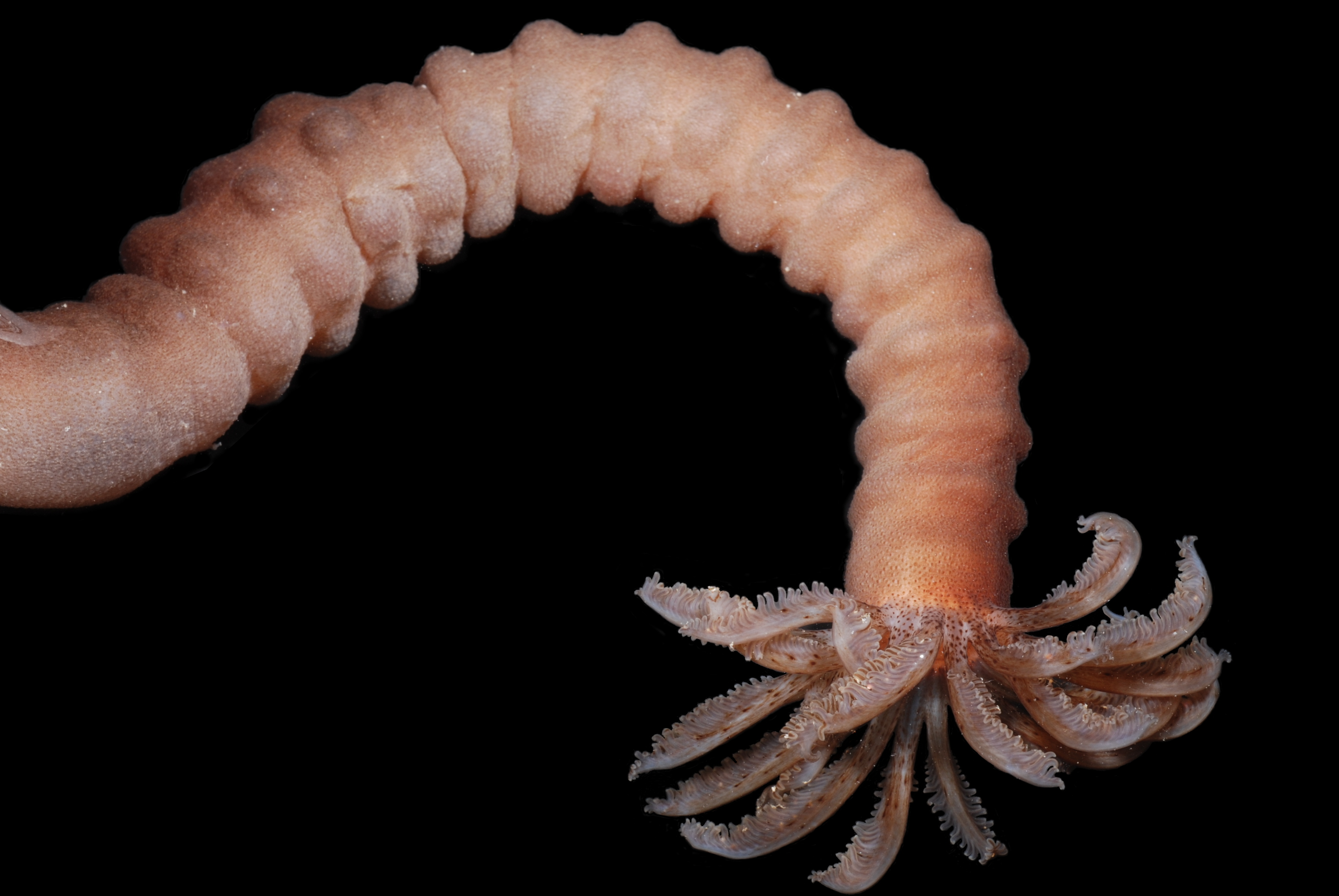
Polyplectana kefersteinii

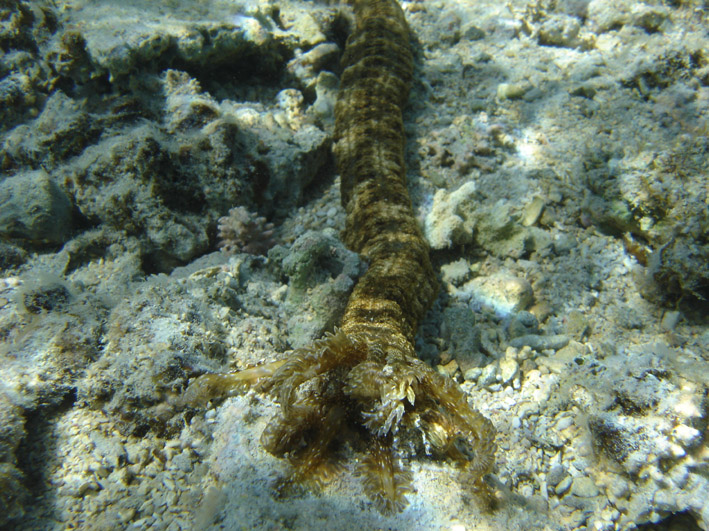
Synapta maculata

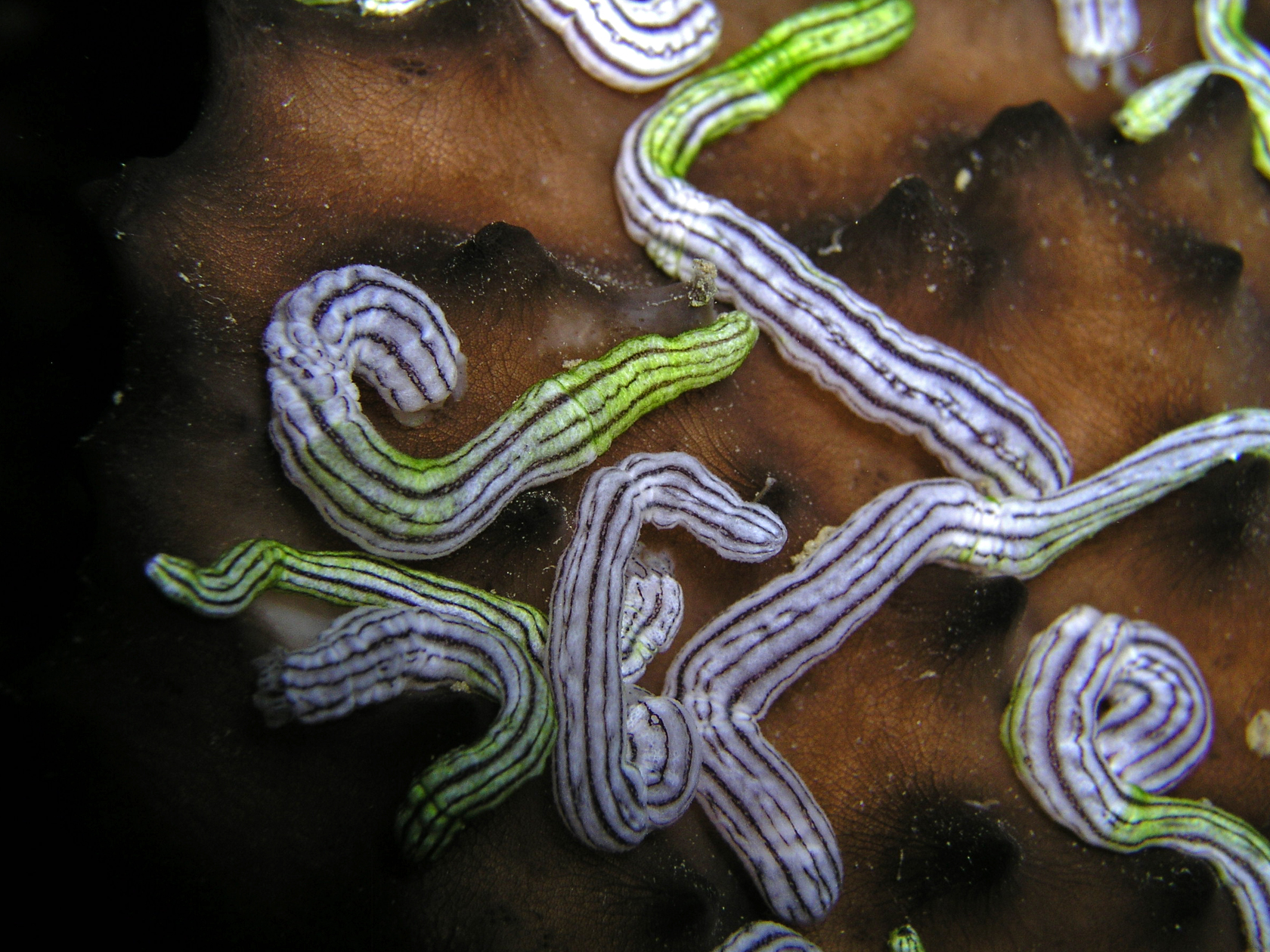
Synaptula lamperti
