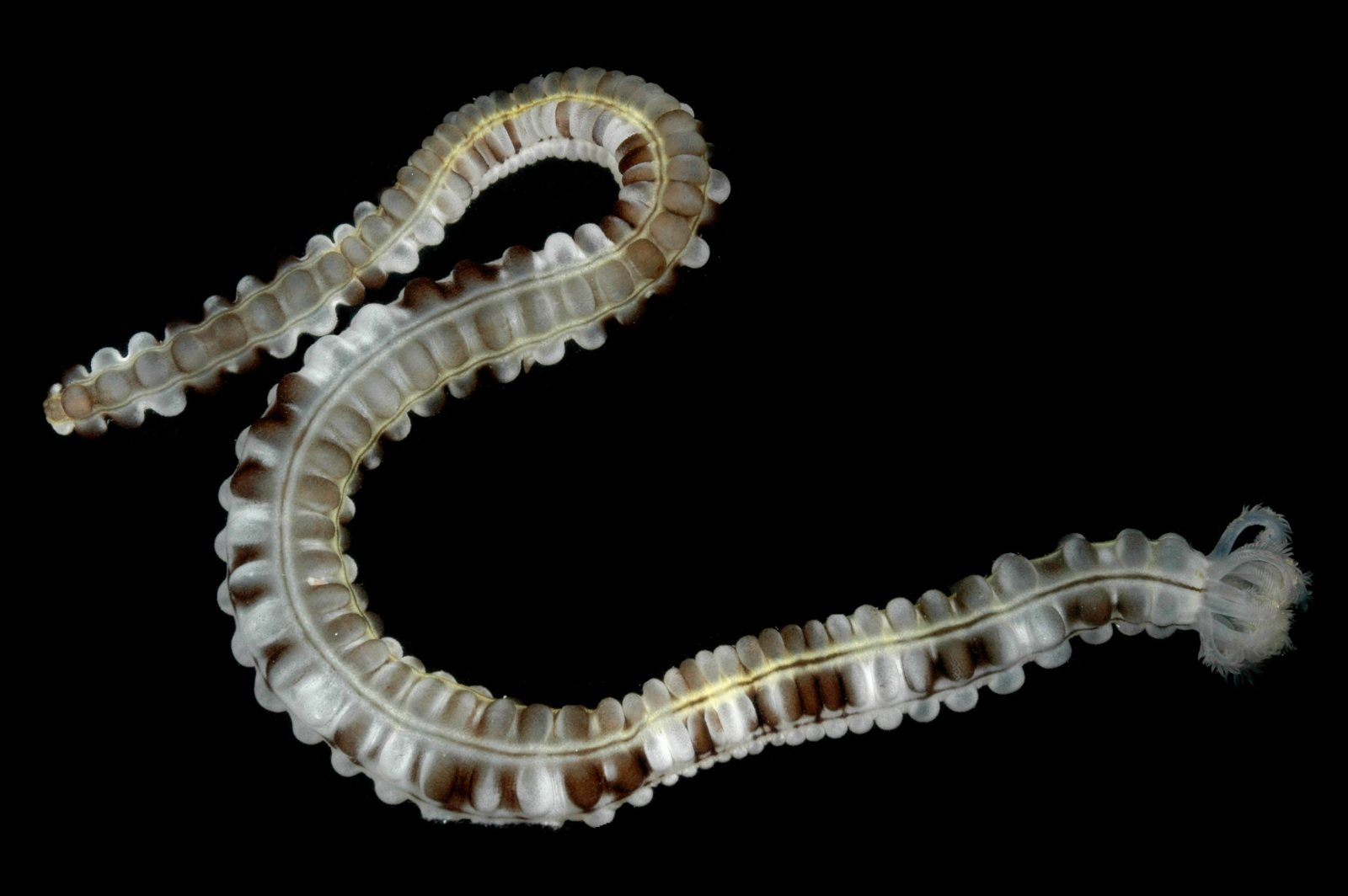
- Euapta godeffroyi

Scientific classification
- Kingdom: Animalia
- Phylum: Echinodermata
- Class: Holothuroidea
- Subclass: Paractinopoda
- Order: Apodida

Families
- †Achistridae; Chiridotidae; Myriotrochidae; Synaptidae

Synonyms
- Apoda [Variant spelling]; Synaptida

= Apodida =

Order of sea cucumbers

Apodida is an order of littoral to deep-sea, largely infaunal holothurians, sea cucumbers. This order comprises three families, 32 genera and about 270 known species, called apodids, "without feet".

== Characteristics ==
These sea cucumbers are vagile holothurians with an elongated shape (up to 3 meters for Synapta maculata), worm or snake-like. Their shape is adapted for burrowing through the sediment, sometimes in a fashion similar to earthworms. Their mouth is surrounded with 10-25 pinnate or peltate tentacles. The absence of tube feet gives the order its name, Apodida meaning without feet : they move by crawling on the sediment, hence they need flat bottoms with few current. Members of this order have a circum-oral ring and tentacles, but do not have tube feet or radial canals. They also lack the complex respiratory trees found in other sea cucumbers, and respire and excrete nitrogenous waste through their skin.

The ossicles, minute calcareous plates embedded in the skin and characteristic of each species, can include wheel and anchor shapes.

== List of families ==
This order contains 3 extant families, consisting in 32 genera in total, for 270 known species.

- family Chiridotidae Östergren, 1898
- family Myriotrochidae Théel, 1877
- family Synaptidae Burmeister, 1837
- family †Achistridae Frizzell and Exline, 1955
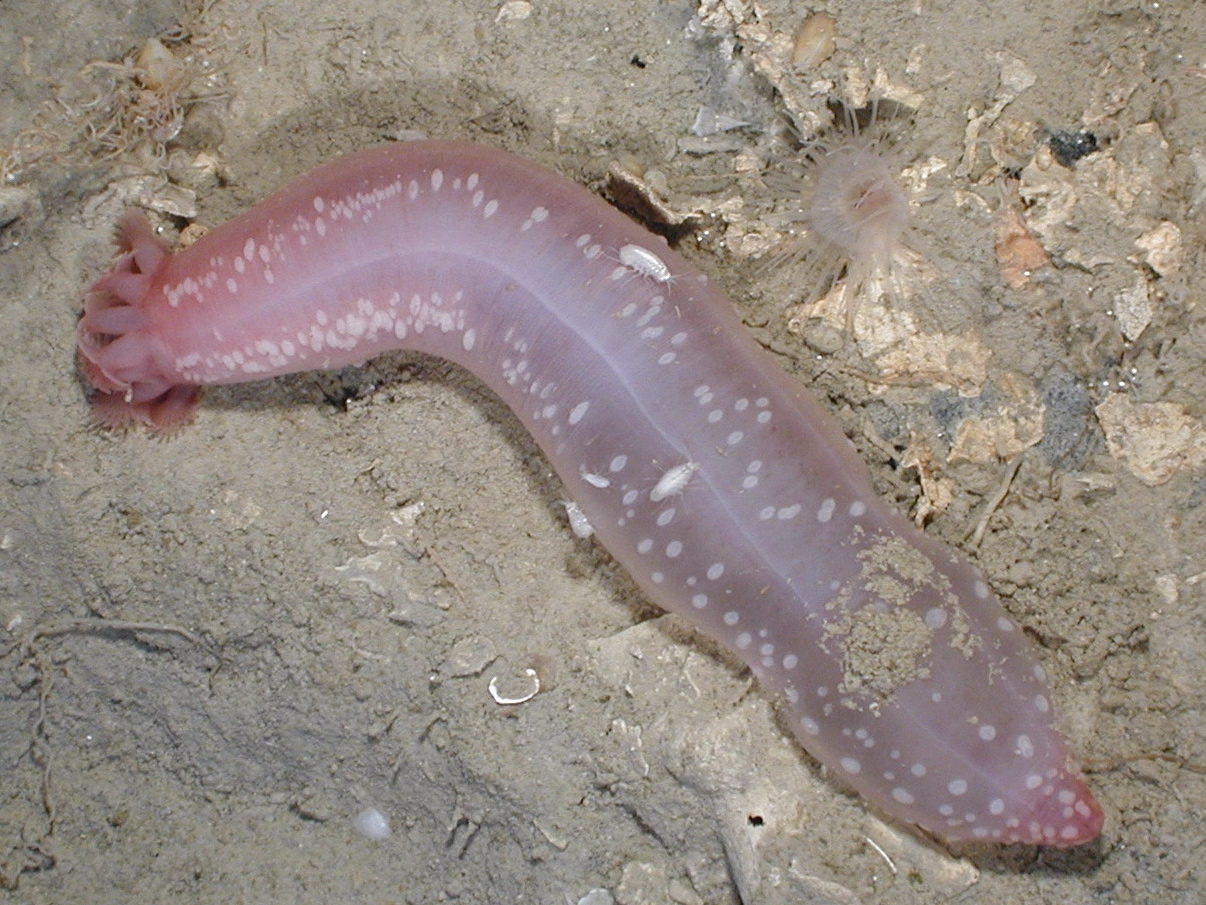
Chiridota hydrothermica

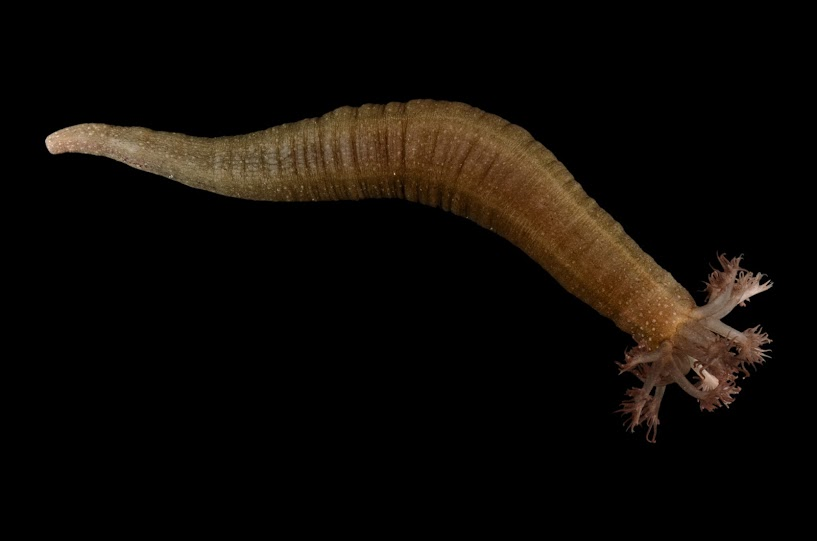
Polycheira rufescens

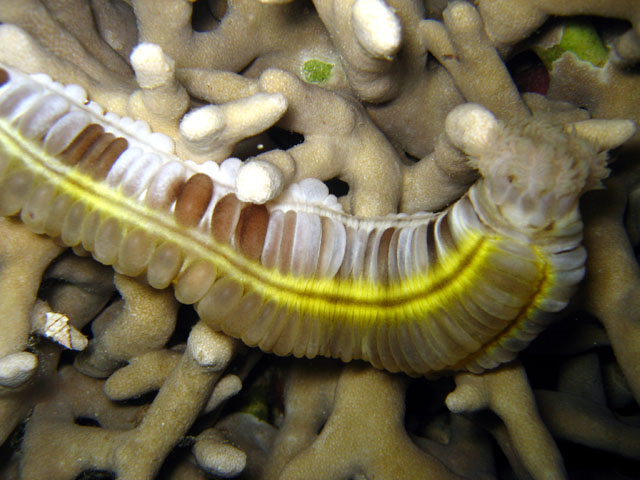
Euapta godeffroyi

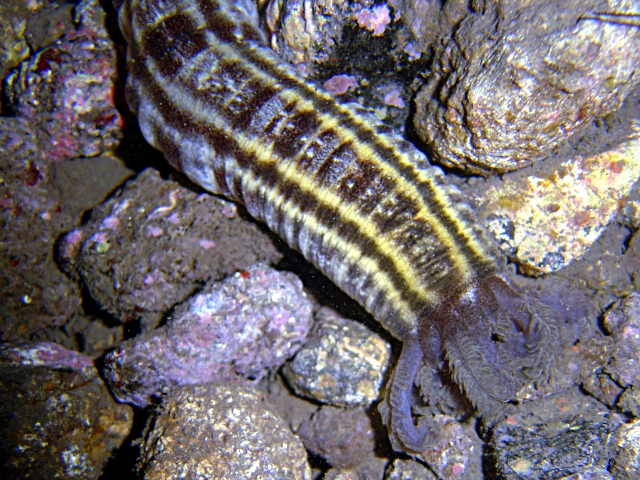
Euapta lappa

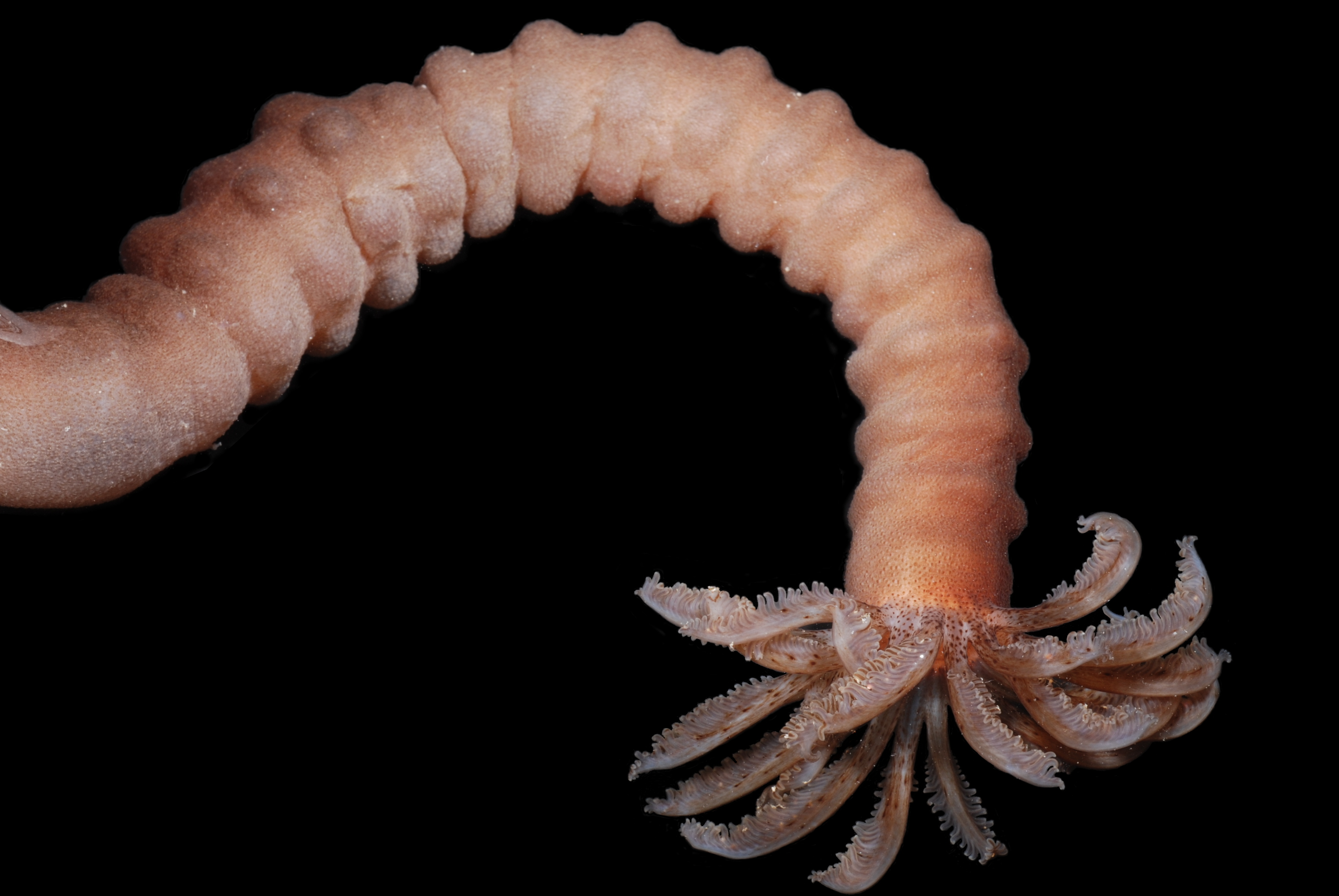
Polyplectana kefersteinii

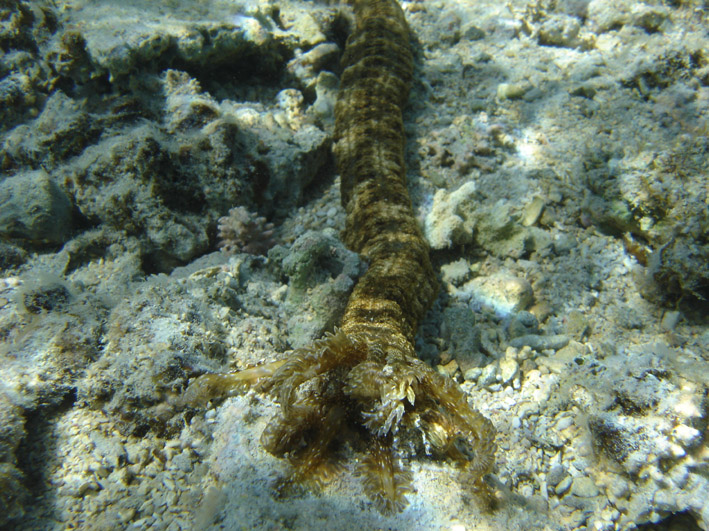
Synapta maculata

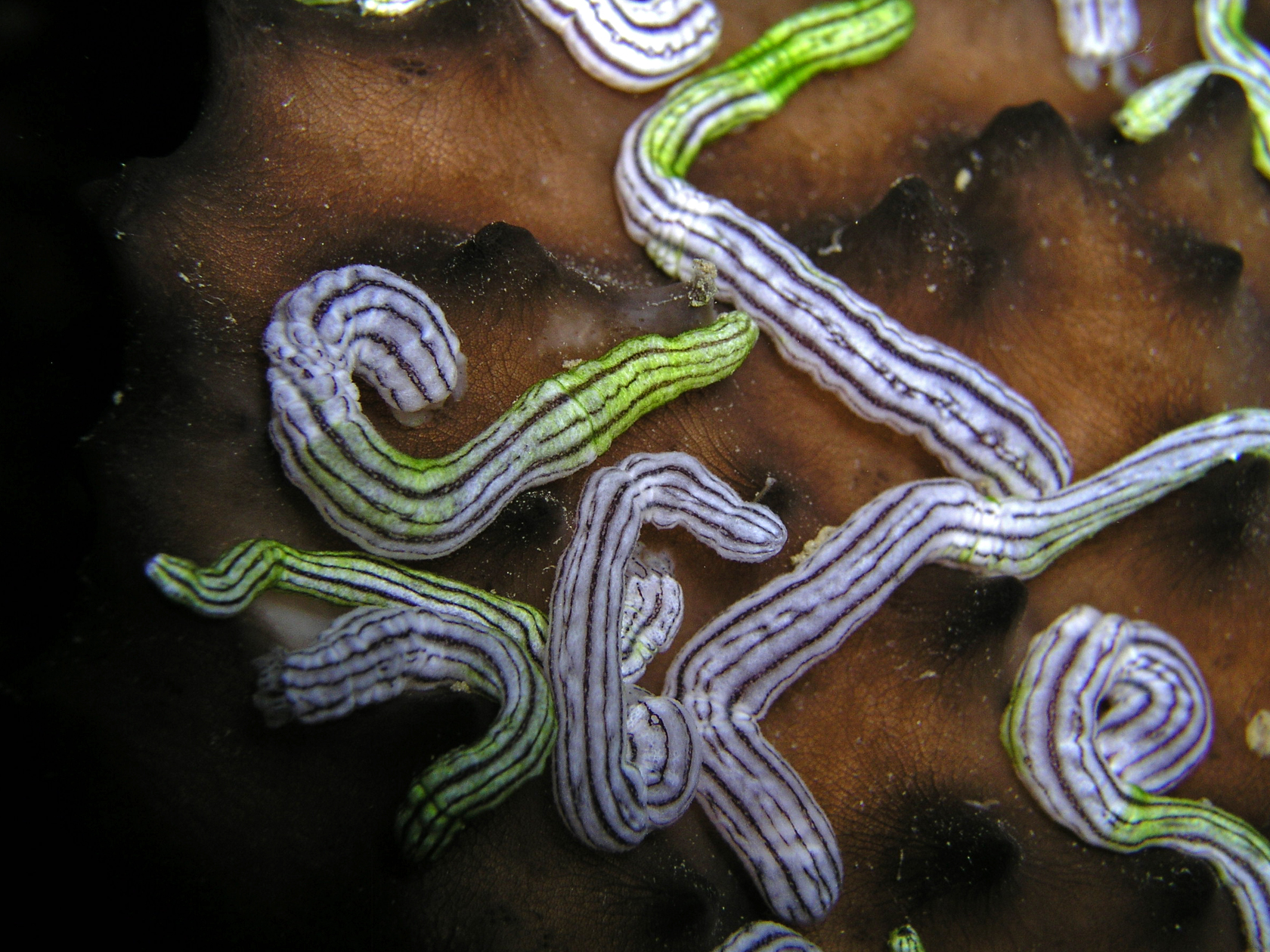
Synaptula lamperti
