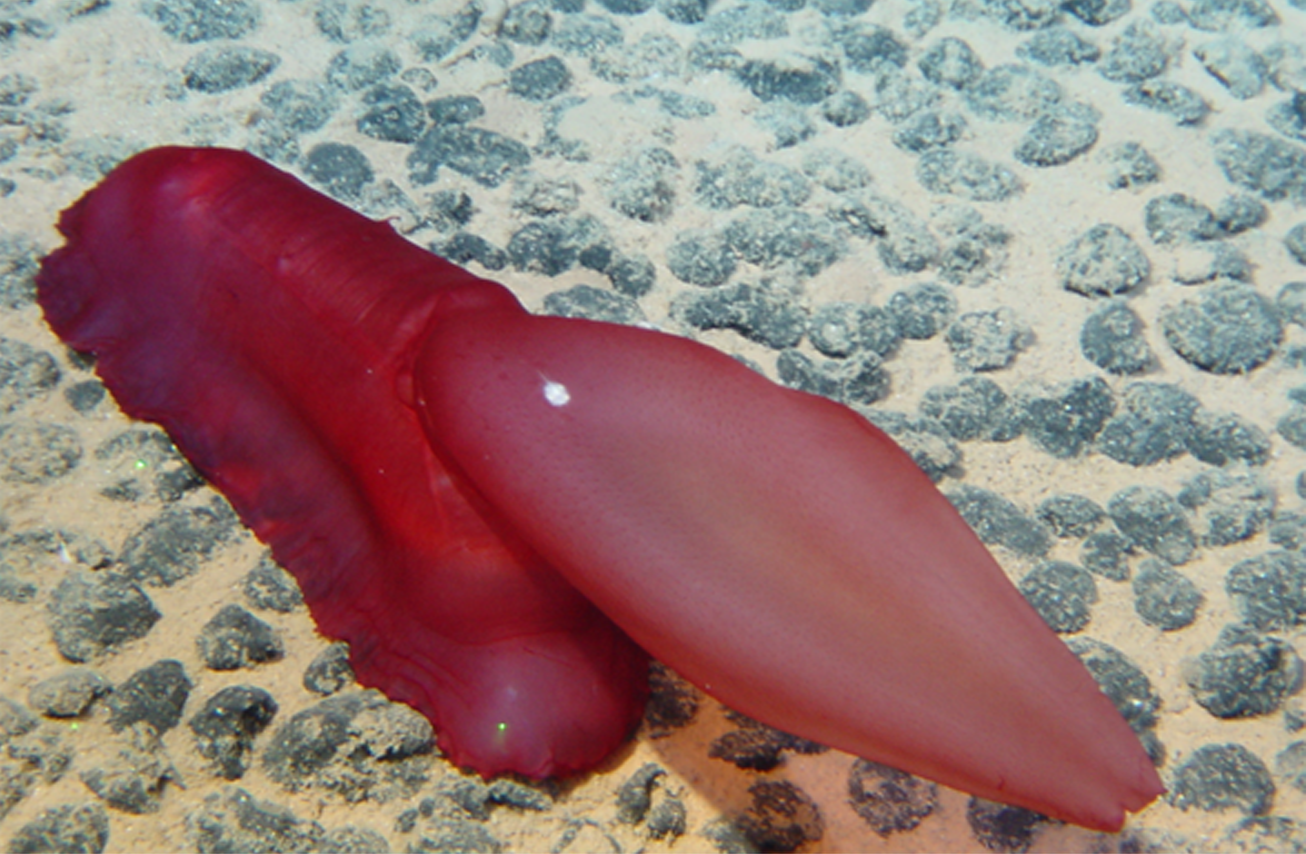
- On manganese nodules

Scientific classification
- Kingdom: Animalia
- Phylum: Echinodermata
- Class: Holothuroidea
- Order: Elasipodida
- Family: Psychropotidae
- Genus: Psychropotes
- Species: P. semperiana

Binomial name
- Psychropotes semperiana Théel, 1882

Synonyms
- Euphronides anchora Hérouard, 1912; Euphronides kerhervei (Hérouard, 1896); Psychropotes kerhervei Hérouard, 1902

= Psychropotes semperiana =

Species of sea cucumber

Psychropotes semperiana is a species of sea cucumber in the family Psychropotidae.
