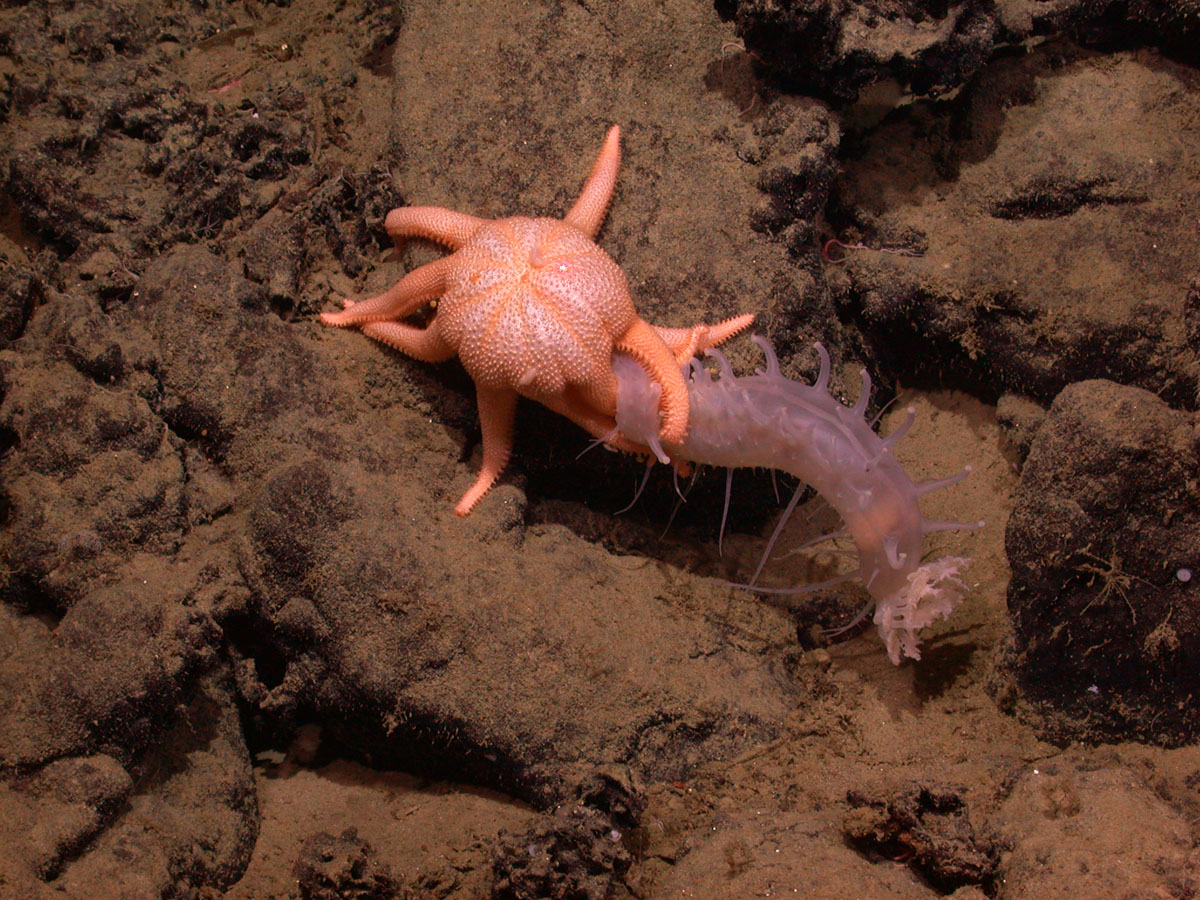
- A Solaster feeding on Pannychia moseley

Conservation status
- Secure (NatureServe)

Scientific classification
- Kingdom: Animalia
- Phylum: Echinodermata
- Class: Holothuroidea
- Order: Elasipodida
- Family: Laetmogonidae
- Genus: Pannychia
- Species: P. moseleyi

Binomial name
- Pannychia moseleyi Théel, 1882

= Pannychia moseleyi =

Species of sea cucumber

Pannychia moseleyi is a sea cucumber in the family Laetmogonidae. It was first described by Johan Hjalmar Théel in 1882. It can be up to 200 mm long and 40 mm wide. It occurs in the benthic zone at depths greater than 400 m.

== Bioluminescence ==
Pannychia moseleyi produces bioluminescence in the form of waves of blue and green light travelling along its body.
