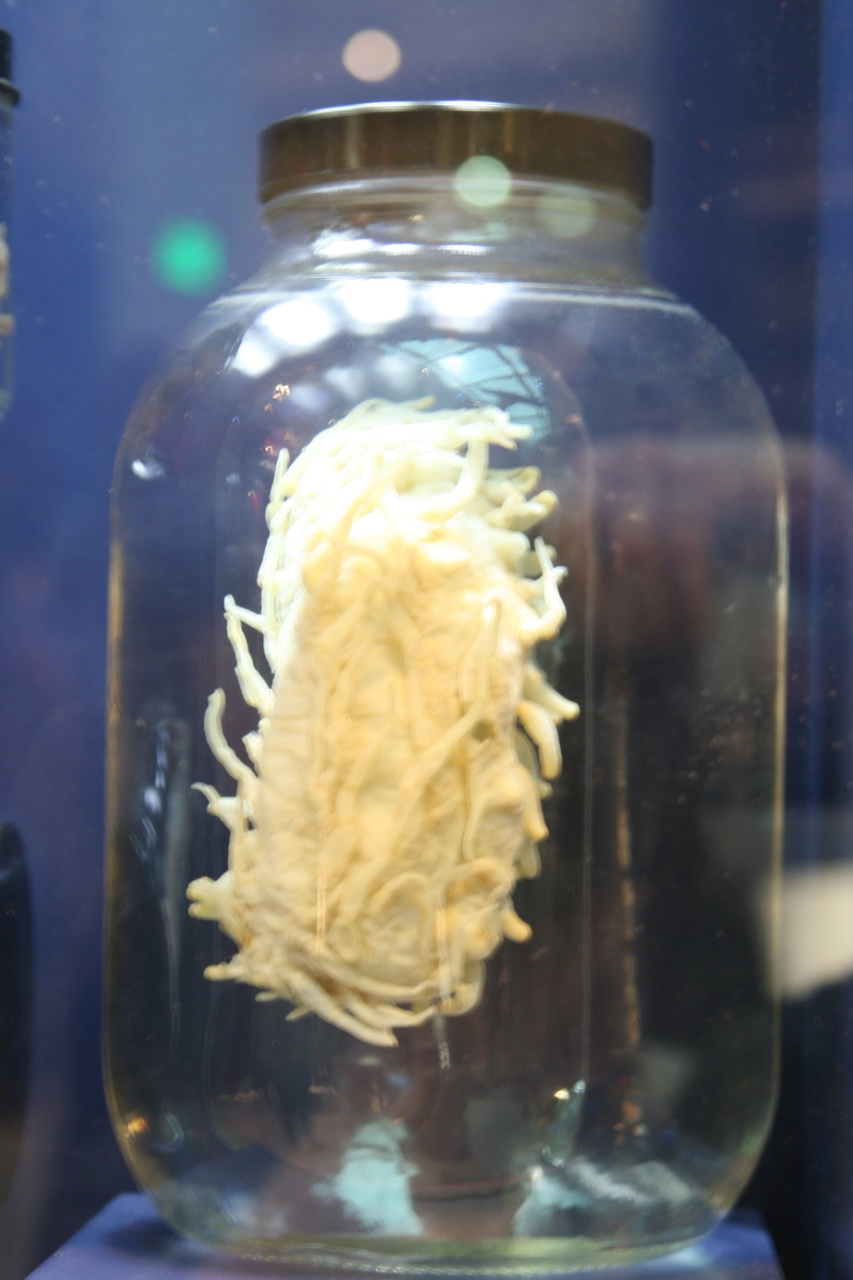

Scientific classification
- Kingdom: Animalia
- Phylum: Echinodermata
- Class: Holothuroidea
- Order: Synallactida
- Family: Deimatidae
- Genus: Oneirophanta
- Species: O. mutabilis

Binomial name
- Oneirophanta mutabilis Théel, 1879

= Oneirophanta mutabilis =

Species of sea cucumber

Oneirophanta mutabilis is a species of sea cucumbers in the family Deimatidae. It is the type species of the genus Oneirophanta. It is found on the seabed at abyssal depths. It was first described by the Swedish zoologist Hjalmar Théel in 1879, being one of the many deep sea animals discovered during the Challenger expedition of 1872–1876.

== Etymology ==
The generic name is from Greek όνειρο (oneiro), 'dream', and φαίνομαι (phainomai), 'to appear', the thing that appears as in a dream. The specific name is Latin mutabilis, meaning changeable.

== Description ==
This sea cucumber has an elongate body that can be up to 160 mm (6.3 in) long and 60 mm (2.4 in) wide. The mouth is at the anterior end of the ventral surface and is surrounded by a ring of twenty tentacles of varying lengths, the tip of each of which has eight projections round the margin. The tube feet on the ventral surface vary in number and are usually in a single row or scattered irregularly. A further row of peg-like tube feet run along each side and the dorsal surface is dotted with papillae (conical fleshy projections of the body wall with sensory tube feet at their apices) that vary from 2 to 50 mm (0.1 to 2.0 in) in length, the longer ones resembling tentacles. The skin is rough, brittle and somewhat transparent and the colour of preserved specimens is white, pale brown or dark brown.

== Distribution and habitat ==
Oneirophanta mutabilis is found on the seabed at abyssal depths in most of the world's oceans. There is little current here and the temperature is permanently about 2 °C (36 °F). In the nearly level Porcupine Abyssal Plain in the Atlantic Ocean there is a bed of sediment that has been gradually accumulating for millennia and Oneirophanta mutabilis is one of a number of sea cucumbers that make up about 90% of the megafauna here.

== Behaviour ==
Oneirophanta mutabilis moves slowly across the sediment on the seabed leaving a trail on the surface. As it progresses it ingests the sediment, processes it through its gut, removes the nutritive organic content and voids the indigestible remains.

Little is known of the reproduction of this species. The eggs are smaller than 400 μm in diameter with little nutritive tissue present which suggests some form of abbreviated development. Whatever it is, it appears to be a successful breeding strategy because this species is very abundant.
