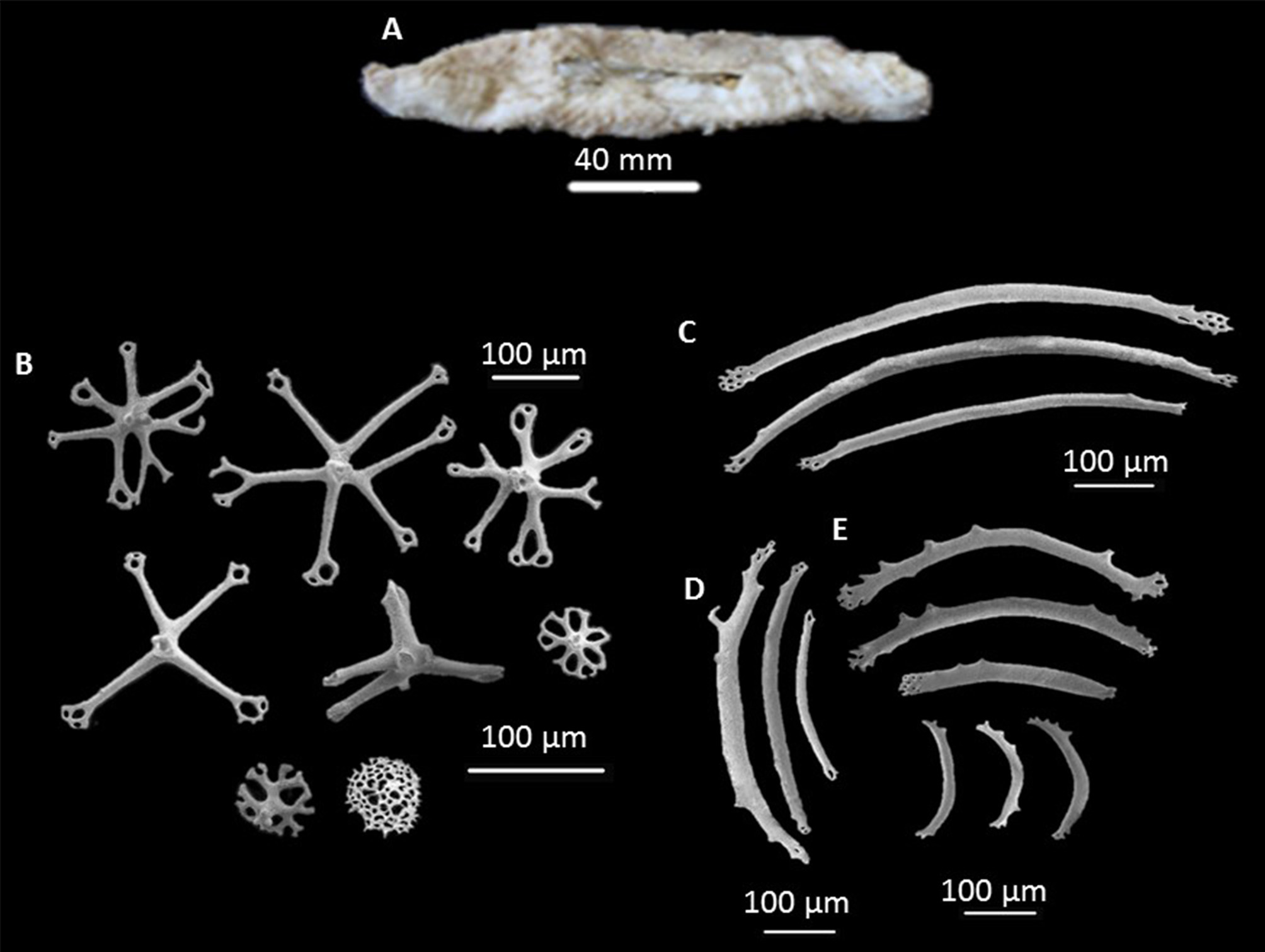
- Synallactes quatrami

Scientific classification
- Kingdom: Animalia
- Phylum: Echinodermata
- Class: Holothuroidea
- Order: Synallactida
- Family: Synallactidae
- Genus: Synallactes; Ludwig, 1894

Synonyms
- Paradeima (Heding, 1940)

= Synallactes =

Genus of echinoderms

Synallactes is a genus of sea cucumbers in the family Synallactidae. The type species of this genus is Synallactes alexandri.

== Species ==
The following species are recognised in the genus Synallactes:

- Synallactes aenigma (Ludwig, 1894)
- Synallactes alexandri (Ludwig, 1894)
- Synallactes challengeri (Théel, 1886)
- Synallactes chuni (Augustin, 1908)
- Synallactes crucifera (Perrier R., 1898)
- Synallactes discoidalis (Mitsukuri, 1912)
- Synallactes dubius (Koehler & Vaney, 1905)
- Synallactes elongata (Heding, 1940)
- Synallactes gilberti (Ohshima, 1915)
- Synallactes heteroculus (Heding, 1940)
- Synallactes horridus (Koehler & Vaney, 1905)
- Synallactes laguardai (Solis-Marin, 2005)
- Synallactes longipapillata (Sibuet, 1978)
- Synallactes mcdanieli (Solís Marín, Caballero Ochoa & Conejeros-Vargas, 2024)
- Synallactes mollis (Cherbonnier, 1952)
- Synallactes monoculus (Sluiter, 1901)
- Synallactes multivesiculatus (Ohshima, 1915)
- Synallactes nozawai (Mitsukuri, 1912)
- Synallactes profundus (Koehler & Vaney, 1905)
- Synallactes quatrami (Thandar, 2018)
- Synallactes rigidus (Koehler & Vaney, 1905)
- Synallactes robertsoni (Vaney, 1908)
- Synallactes sagamiensis (Augustin, 1908)
- Synallactes samyni (Thandar, 2008)
- Synallactes triradiata (Mitsukuri, 1912)
- Synallactes virgulasolida (Massin & Hendrickx, 2010)
- Synallactes viridilimus (Cherbonnier, 1952)
