= Amperima rosea =

Scientific classification
- Kingdom: Animalia
- Phylum: Echinodermata
- Class: Holothuroidea
- Order: Elasipodida
- Family: Elpidiidae
- Genus: Amperima
- Species: A. rosea

Binomial name
- Amperima rosea (R. Perrier, 1896)

Species of sea cucumber

Amperima rosea is a species of sea cucumber in the family Elpidiidae. It is found on the seabed at abyssal depths of 4,000 m (2.5 mi) or more. Around 1996, its numbers in the Porcupine Abyssal Plain in the northeastern Atlantic increased dramatically from a few individuals per hectare to over six thousand per hectare, a phenomenon that became known as the "Amperima event".

== Distribution and habitat ==
Amperima rosea is a small sea cucumber growing to a length of between 20 and 35 mm (0.8 and 1.4 in). It occurs on the sediment-covered seabed of the deeper parts of the Pacific, Indian and Atlantic Oceans, including the Porcupine Abyssal Plain in the northeastern Atlantic.

== Behaviour ==
Amperima rosea is a detritivore and feeds on phytodetritus by sifting through the sediment on the seabed. The phytodetritus is the remains of phytoplankton from shallow water locations which drifts down like snow or under certain conditions sinks rapidly to the sea floor. Amperima rosea breeds at any time of year. The eggs are small (less than 200μm in diameter) and lack much yolk indicating that larval development is likely to be planktonic. The species displays a high level of fecundity and it is likely that mass spawning takes place after some external stimulus such as a sudden increase in food supply.

== Amperima event ==
In the mid-1990s in the Porcupine Abyssal Plain, the density of Amperima rosea on the seabed increased from pre-1995 levels of two or three individuals per hectare to over six thousand per hectare, and this new high population level was maintained in subsequent years. During the same period, other species of sea cucumber in the area also increased in number but decreased in average size and the brittle star Ophiocten hastatum also had an explosive increase in population density. The rate at which 100% of the surface layer of the seabed was completely turned over was reduced from two and a half years to six weeks. The increase in density of the sea cucumbers has been linked to a greater abundance of phytodetritus and this in turn may be due to higher surface water temperatures caused by climate change. The rapid increase in sea cucumber populations as a response to increased food supply may have reduced the build-up of organic materials in the sediment which would otherwise have occurred.
