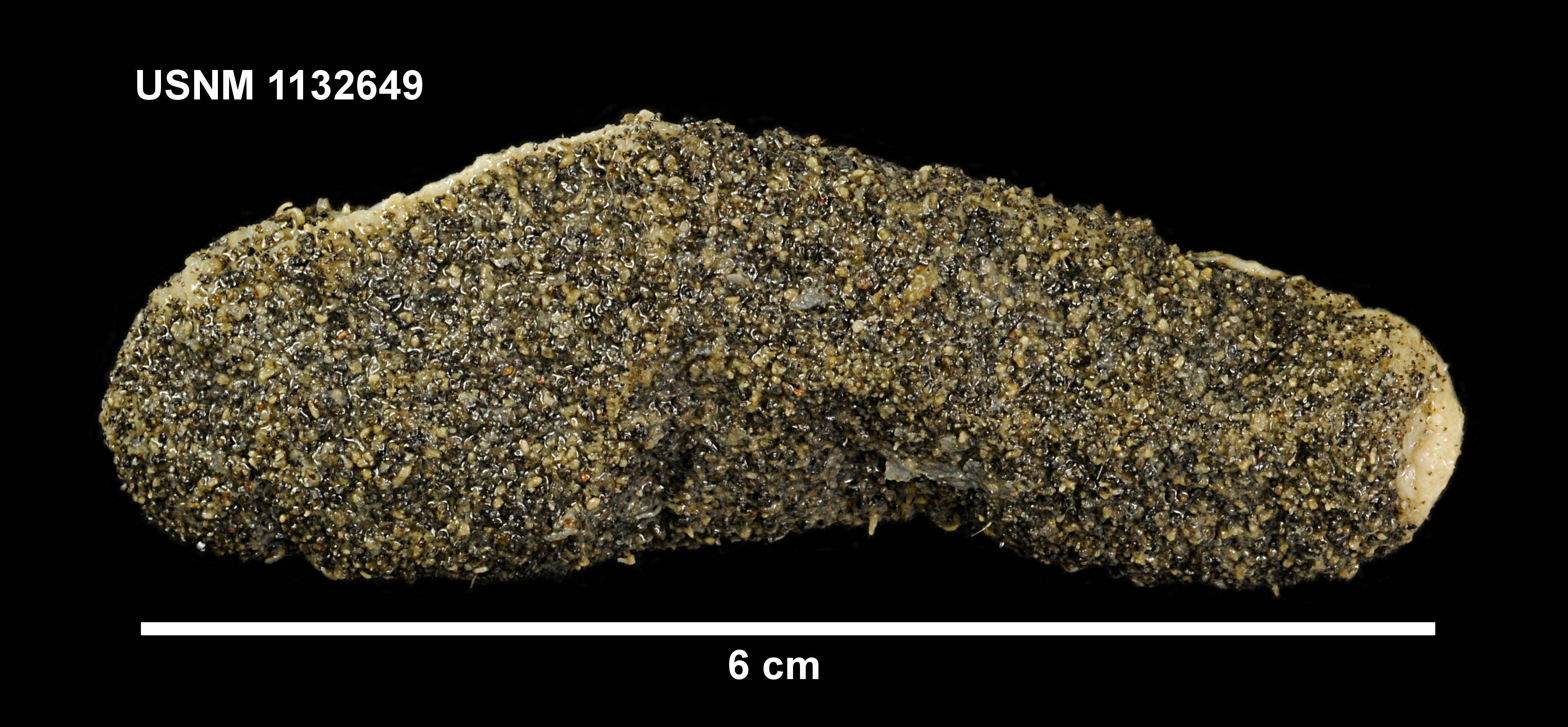
- Pseudostichopus peripatus

Scientific classification
- Kingdom: Animalia
- Phylum: Echinodermata
- Class: Holothuroidea
- Order: Persiculida
- Family: Pseudostichopodidae; Kerr, Paulay, Reich, Wilson, Carvajal & Rouse, 2017
- Genus: Pseudostichopus; Théel, 1886

Synonyms
- (Genus): Filithuria Koehler & Vaney, 1905; Peristichopus Djakonov, 1949; Plicastichopus Heding, 1940; Pseudostichopus (Pseudostichopus) Heding, 1940; Pseudostichopus (Trachostichopus) Heding, 1940; Trachostichopus Heding, 1940

= Pseudostichopus =

Genus of echinoderms

Pseudostichopus is a genus of sea cucumbers belonging to the monotypic family Pseudostichopodidae. The genus has a cosmopolitan distribution.

== Species ==
The following species are recognised in the genus Pseudostichopus:

- Pseudostichopus aemulatus Solis-Marin & Billett in Solis-Marin et al., 2004
- Pseudostichopus echinatus Thandar, 1992
- Pseudostichopus elegans (Koehler & Vaney, 1905)
- Pseudostichopus hyalegerus (Sluiter, 1901)
- Pseudostichopus langeae Thandar, 2009
- Pseudostichopus mollis Théel, 1886
- Pseudostichopus occultatus Marenzeller von, 1893
- Pseudostichopus papillatus (D'yakonov, 1949)
- Pseudostichopus peripatus (Sluiter, 1901)
- Pseudostichopus profundi D'yakonov, 1949
- Pseudostichopus spiculiferus (O'Loughlin, 2002)
- Pseudostichopus tuberosus O'Loughlin & Ahearn, 2005
