= Porcupine Abyssal Plain =

Stretch of seabed near Ireland

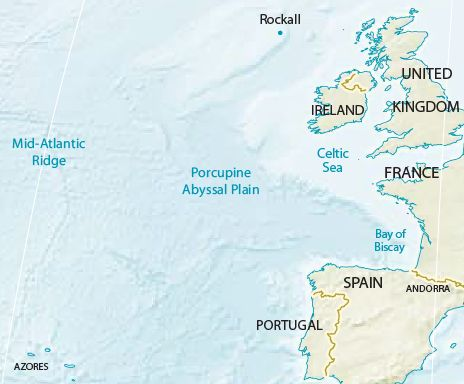
Porcupine Abyssal Plain.

The Porcupine Abyssal Plain (PAP) is located in international waters, adjacent to the Irish continental margin. The PAP lies beyond the Porcupine Bank's deepest point and is southwest of it. It has a muddy seabed, with scattered abyssal hills that covers an area approximately half the size of Europe's landmass. Its depth ranges from 4,000 metres (13,000 ft) to 4,850 m (15,910 ft).

== Characteristics ==
The Porcupine Abyssal Plain is a vast, relatively level stretch of seabed with a depth range of 4,000 to 4,850 m (13,120 to 15,910 ft). It has a muddy floor in the abyssopelagic zone and scattered rocky abyssal hills that rise into the bathypelagic zone forming seamounts and knolls. The water at this depth is relatively stable and moving slowly towards the south and southeast. There is a downward flow of organic detritus derived from primary production in the upper layers of ocean that settles on the sea floor.

== Fauna ==
A large number of marine invertebrates inhabit the abyssal plain. About 90% by number and biomass of the macrobenthos are sea cucumbers and some of the commonest species are Oneirophanta mutabilis, Pseudostichopus villosus and Psychropotes longicauda. These animals are increasing in number as more phytodetritus falls to the seabed. Each species is found to feed on a slightly different portion. Another sea cucumber, Amperima rosea, saw a great leap in its abundance in the years 1995 and 1996, increasing from two or three individuals per hectare to more than six thousand. Before 1995 it took about two and a half years for the sea cucumbers to churn up the surface layers of the sediment but since 1996 this process takes only about six weeks.

The ecosystem is profoundly changed by the reworking and consequent aeration of the seabed surface layers. The starfish Psilaster andromeda which feeds mainly on molluscs is present on the abyssal plain. The detritivore starfish Hyphalaster inermis and Styracaster chuni, both of which feed by ingesting mud, are also common. There are a number of species of sea anemone present, also sea spiders, tunicates and dumbo octopuses (Grimpoteuthis spp). The ecosystem is also home to the xenophyophores Occultammina, Reticulammina, and Galeathammina.

== Porcupine Abyssal Plain Observatory ==
The observatory is multidisciplinary and moored, and was deployed early on 7 October 2002 at 49° N and -16° 30' W. It is coordinated by the National Oceanography Centre and provides time-series datasets used for monitoring and analysing the effects of climate change on the deep Atlantic Ocean and its ecosystems. A full-depth mooring was established in 2012, with autonomous sensors to measure ocean temperature, salinity, chlorophyll fluorescence, carbon dioxide and nitrate. A 2010 collaboration between the Natural Environment Research Council and the United Kingdom Met Office has led to simultaneous monitoring of the ocean and atmosphere.

The datasets are open access and available in near real time. They are uploaded to MyOcean and other websites daily for use in modelling activities. The datasets can be combined to show short-term variations on a daily or seasonal basis and longer term trends. The consequences of storms and other events can also be monitored.
