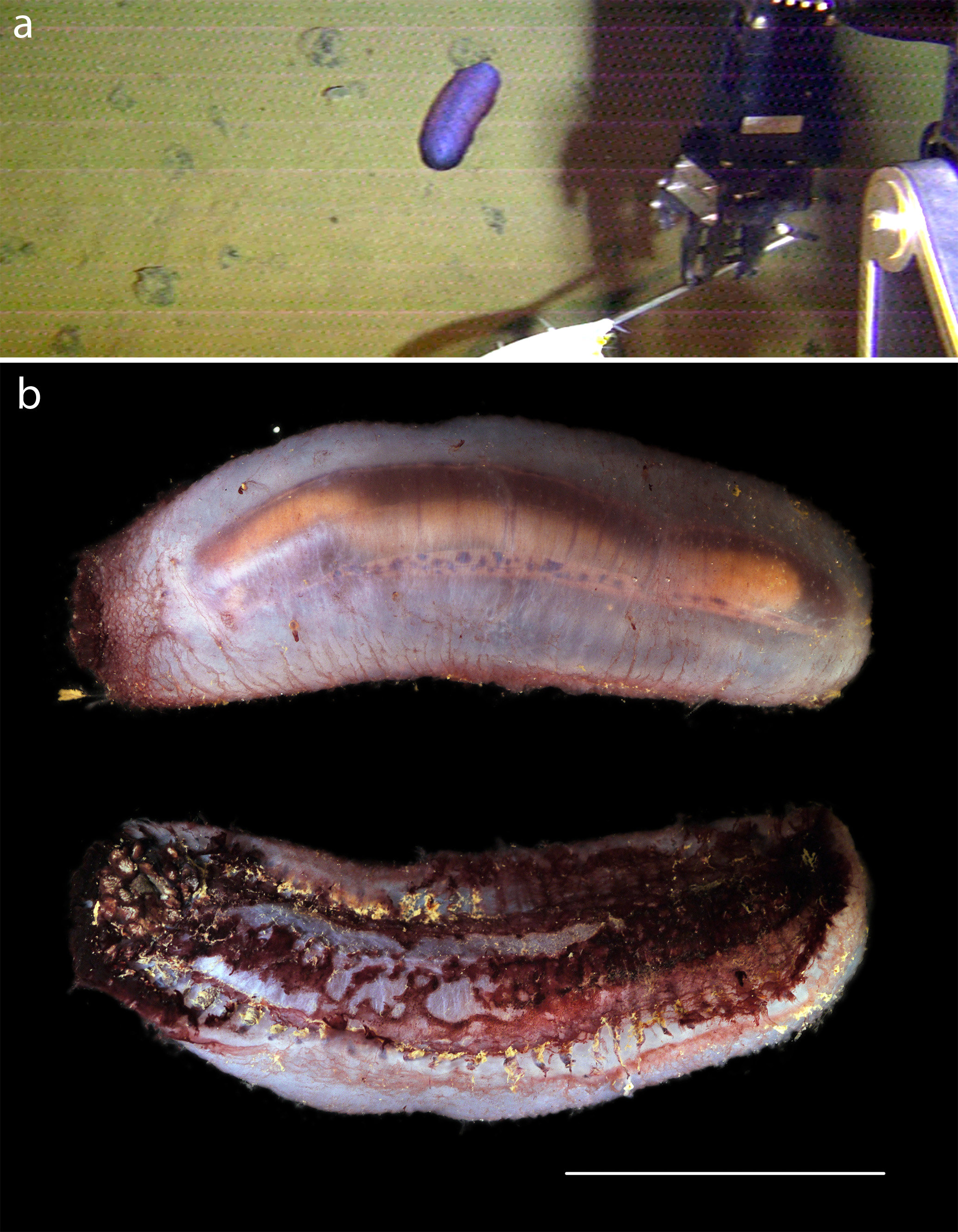
- Benthodytes sanguinolenta

Scientific classification
- Kingdom: Animalia
- Phylum: Echinodermata
- Class: Holothuroidea
- Order: Elasipodida
- Family: Psychropotidae
- Genus: Benthodytes; Théel, 1882

= Benthodytes =

Genus of sea cucumbers

Benthodytes is a genus of sea cucumbers in the family Psychropotidae.

== Discovery ==
This group of sea cucumbers was first described by scientists aboard the H.M.S. Challenger during its 1873-1876 voyage. Théel described the genus: "Body more or less depressed, with the anterior part of its brim rather large. Mouth ventral, at a greater distance from the foremost extremity of the body. Anus posterior, dorsal, usually almost terminal. Tentacles (?) twelve to twenty. Pedicels arranged in a single row round the brim of the body and in a double one along the odd ambulacrum. The dorsal surface seldom naked, commonly with a greater or smaller number of retractile or non-retractile, more or less inconsiderable processes, arranged in a single row all along each ambulacrum or in an irregular double row, or scattered over the lateral interambulacrae." Théel also documented the details of species B. typica, B. sanguinolenta, and B. abyssicola.

== Anatomy ==
Among Psychropotidae, Benthodytes (synonym Benthodites) are characterized by "soft retractile tentacles, circum-oral or post-oral papillae and the absence of an unpaired dorsal appendage."

== Significance ==
Several species of Benthodytes are good indicators of the potential impacts of deep-sea mining and have been the subject of multiple studies. Identification of distinct species is most often based on photography, since the delicate anatomy of the sea cucumbers is often damaged in the process of sampling. Genome sequencing technology is paving the way for more accurate accounts of the evolution and taxonomy of Benthodytes species, starting with B. rosea and B. typica. Additionally, the mitochondrial genome of B. marianensis has been sequenced and was found to contain a novel gene arrangement among holothurians that could be an adaptation allowing for survival at great depths.

== Species ==
Several species included in the genus Benthodytes have been reclassified using different nomenclature. This list is subject to change as phylogenetic data clarifies the relationships among difficult-to-identify creatures whose soft appendages are often lost in the process of sample collection.

- Benthodytes abyssicola
- Benthodytes gosarsi
- Benthodytes incerta
- Benthodytes lingua
- Benthodytes manuensis
- Benthodytes marianensis
- Benthodytes plana
- Benthodytes sanguinolenta
- Benthodytes sibogae
- Benthodytes superba
- Benthodytes typica
- Benthodytes valdiviae
- Benthodytes violeta
- Benthodytes wolffi
