= Leunis =

Leunis is a Flemish-origin surname. Notable people with the surname include:

- Joanna Leunis (born 1981), Belgian dancer
- Johannes Matthias Joseph Leunis (1802–1873), German clergyman naturalist
