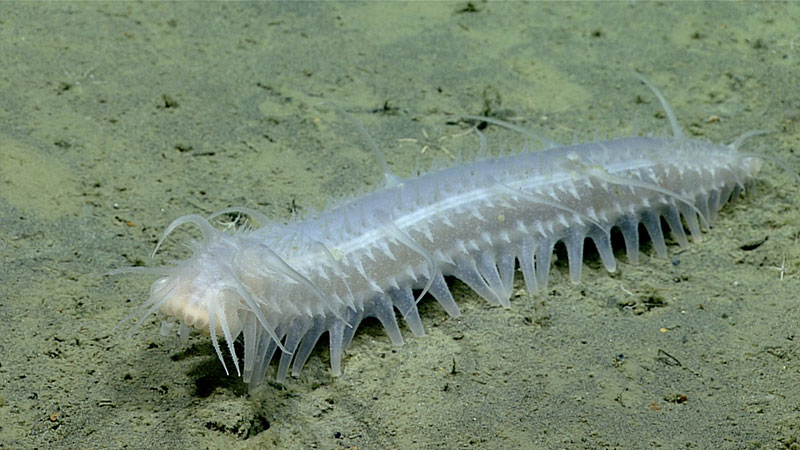

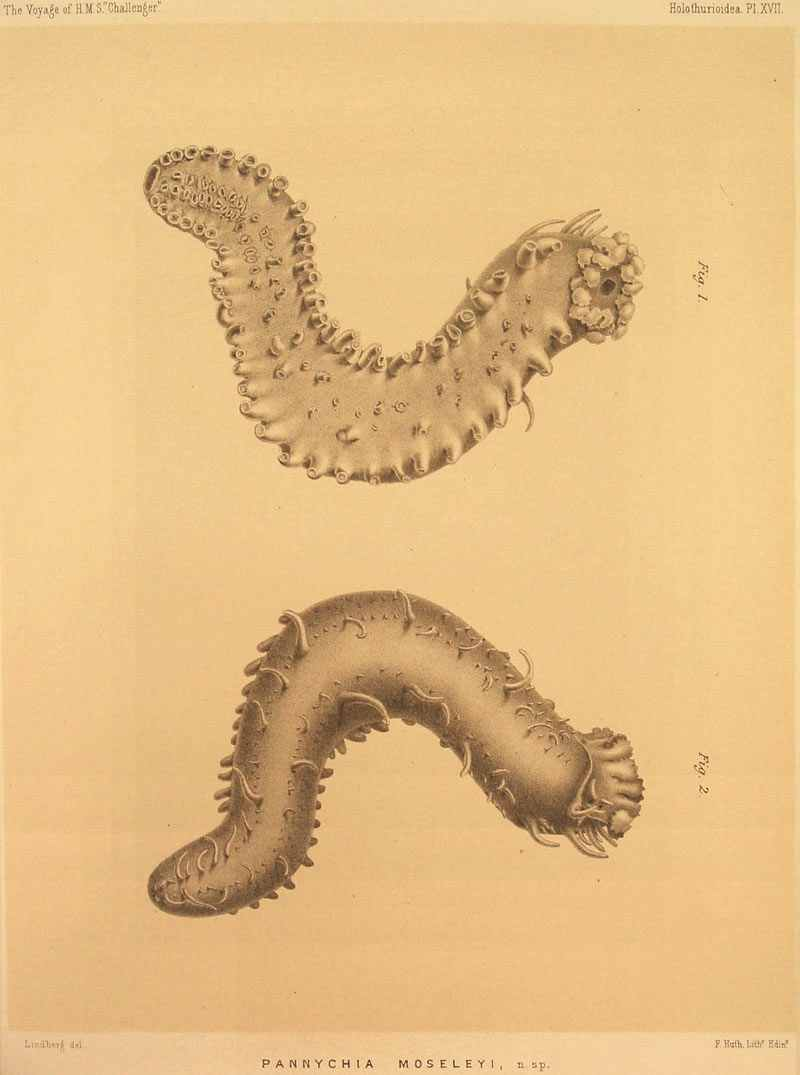

Scientific classification
- Kingdom: Animalia
- Phylum: Echinodermata
- Class: Holothuroidea
- Order: Elasipodida
- Family: Laetmogonidae
- Genus: Pannychia; Théel, 1882

Type species
- Pannychia moseleyi Théel, 1882
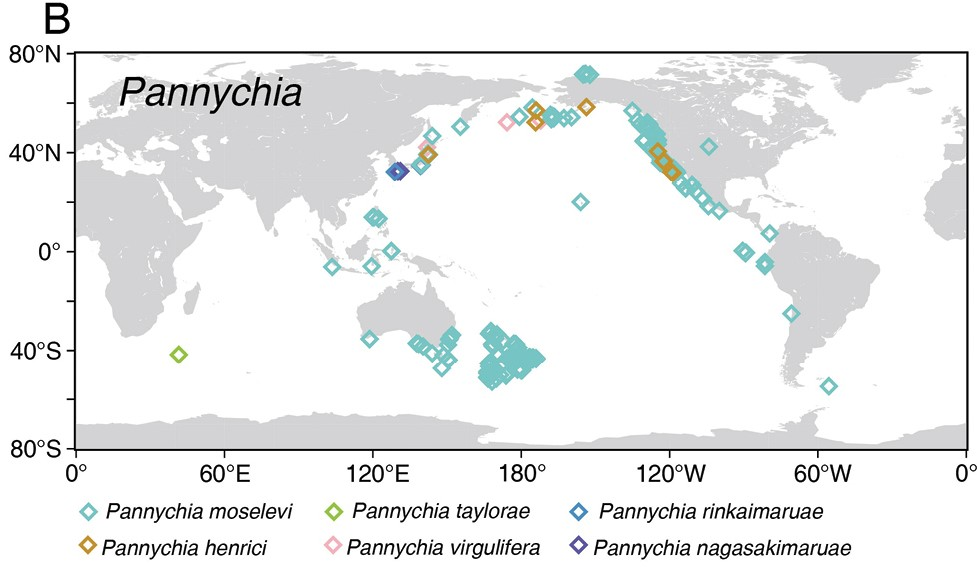

Synonyms
- Laetmophasma Ludwig, 1893

= Pannychia =

Genus of holothurians (sea cucumbers)

Pannychia is a genus of sea cucumber of the family Laetmogonidae. They are part of the benthos, preferring habitats with soft sediment, and inhabiting depths of 212 to 2,598 metres (696 to 8,524 ft). Within these habitats in the North Pacific Ocean, they are known to dominate the ecosystem.

== Description ==
The genus is diagnosed by the possession of a subventral mouth without any papillae surrounding it, though there are numerous, slender papillae elsewhere across the body.16-20 non-retractile tentacles are also present, and possess digitiform discs. Pannychia's ossicles are prominent. These are predominantly wheel-shaped, though ossicles described as "arched rods" occur in P. henrici and P. virgulifera. There are also larger and smaller forms of the wheel ossicles. The tube feet are variable in size. Pannychia can be distinguished from all other Elasipodida through two synapomorphies: the presence of "dorsal papillae on ventro-lateral ambulacra and large wheel ossicles with brim teeth", and from other Laetmogonids through the presence of tube feet on the mid-ventral radius. They differ from Laetmogone by their shorter papillae.

In life, Pannychia species vary from white to dark violet, and some may be light-yellow or pale-brown.

=== Genera ===
Seven species are currently recognized in this genus:

- Pannychia fecundum (Ludwig, 1893)
- Pannychia henrici Ludwig, 1894
- Pannychia moseleyi Théel, 1882
- Pannychia nagasakimaruae Ogawa, Kobayashi, Kohtsuka & Fujita, 2023
- Pannychia rinkaimaruae Ogawa, Kobayashi, Kohtsuka & Fujita, 2023
- Pannychia taylorae O'Loughlin in O'Loughlin et al., 2013
- Pannychia virgulifera Ohshima, 1915

Historically, seven species/subspecies of Pannychia were recognized, but along with Laetmophasama they were all synonymized into P. moseleyi. A 2022 would "rehabilitate" P. henrici and P. virgulifera, rendering these names valid again.

The following cladogram is based on a bayesian inference and Maximum Likelihood phylogenetic analysis, based on analysis of mitochondrial cytochrome c oxidase subunit I (COI):

- Psychronaetes
- - Benthogone abstrusa
  - Pannychia
    - - Pannychia cf. moseleyi
      - - Pannychia henrici
        - Pannychia moseleyi
    - - - Pannychia nagasakimurae
        - Pannychia rinkaimaruae
      - Pannychia virgulifera
