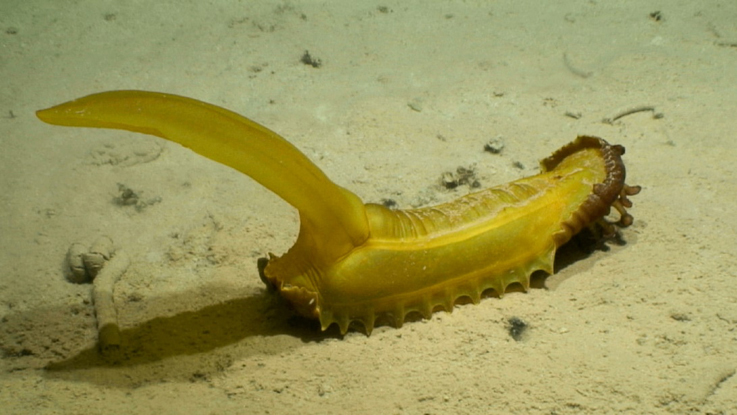

Scientific classification
- Kingdom: Animalia
- Phylum: Echinodermata
- Class: Holothuroidea
- Order: Elasipodida
- Family: Psychropotidae
- Genus: Psychropotes
- Species: P. longicauda

Binomial name
- Psychropotes longicauda Théel, 1882

Synonyms
- List: Euphronides dyscrita Clark, 1920; Nectothuria translucida Belyaev & Vinograd, 1969; P. brucei Vaney, 1908; P. buglossa Perrier E., 1886; P. dubiosa Ludwig, 1893; P. fucata Perrier, 1896; P. furcata Perrier, 1896; P. grimaldii Hérouard, 1896; P. laticauda Vaney, 1908; P. longicauda var. antarctica Vaney, 1908; P. longicauda var. fusco-purpurea Théel, 1882; P. longicauda var. monstrosa Théel, 1882; P. raripes Ludwig, 1893

= Psychropotes longicauda =

Species of sea cucumber

Psychropotes longicauda is a species of sea cucumber in the family Psychropotidae. It inhabits the deep sea where the adult is found on the seabed. The larva is pelagic and has an appendage shaped like a sail on its back which may enable it to move through the water.

The animal is sometimes called the "gummy squirrel" because it looks like a squirrel-shaped gummy bear.

== Description ==
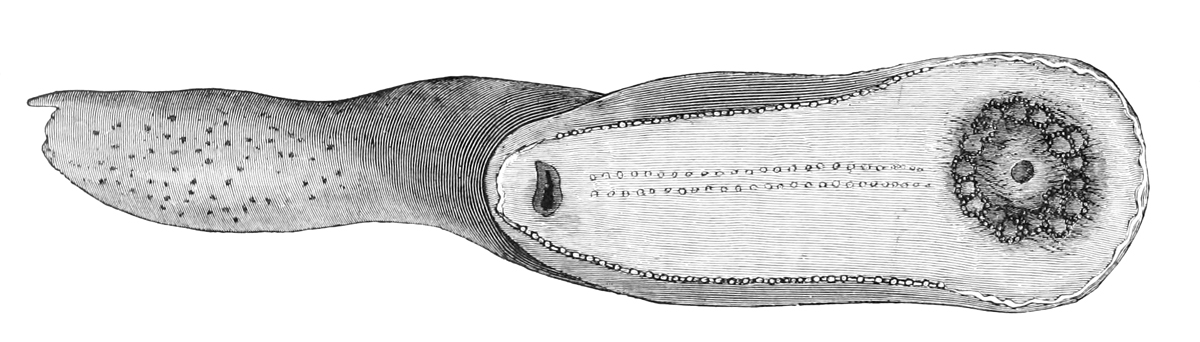
Ventral view

As an adult, Psychropotes longicauda has eighteen short feeding tentacles, each with a leathery terminal disc with retractile processes projecting around the margin. Its body is very flexible and can grow to a length of between 14 and 32 cm (5.5 and 12.6 in). It is approximately cylindrical but broadest and somewhat flattened near the anterior end. At the posterior end there is a dorsal, tail-like appendage up to 12 cm (4.7 in) long, either pointed or with a pair of unequal-length tips. There is a double row of small tube feet along the ventral surface and a single row of larger tube feet on each side of the body. The skin is soft and pliable and the colour is violet in preserved specimens.

The larva has ten tentacles and is transparent with a reddish hue at the anterior end. It has an unpaired gelatinous dorsal appendage. Larvae can grow to at least 23 mm (0.91 in) in length excluding the appendage which may be nearly as long as the body.

== Distribution and habitat ==
Psychropotes longicauda is a cosmopolitan abyssal species of sea cucumber and is found on the seabed throughout the world's deep oceans. Its larva is pelagic and is often found more than 500 m (1,600 ft) above the ocean floor but still in the abyssal zone.

== Behaviour ==
Adult Psychropotes longicauda are found on soft sediments through which they sift with the aid of their feeding tentacles. The eggs, with a diameter of 4.4 mm (0.17 in), are the largest of any echinoderm. The size of the eggs, and the fact that the larvae do not appear to feed, makes it so that the yolk nourishes them for an extended time and that they can therefore disperse widely.
