= Psycheotrephes =

Scientific classification
- Kingdom: Animalia
- Phylum: Echinodermata
- Class: Holothuroidea
- Order: Elasipodida
- Family: Psychropotidae
- Genus: Psycheotrephes; Théel, 1882

Genus of sea cucumbers

Psycheotrephes is a genus of sea cucumbers in the family Psychropotidae.

== Species ==
The following species are recognised in the genus Psycheotrephes:

- Psycheotrephes discoveryi Rogacheva & Cross in Rogacheva et al., 2009
- Psycheotrephes exigua Théel, 1882
- Psycheotrephes magna Hansen, 1975
- Psycheotrephes recta (Vaney, 1908)
