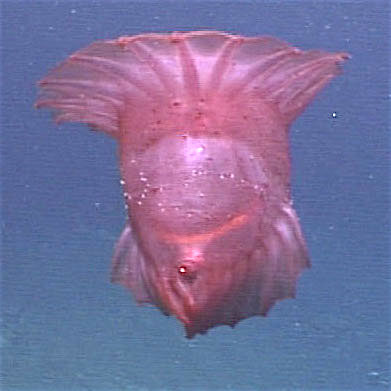

Scientific classification
- Kingdom: Animalia
- Phylum: Echinodermata
- Class: Holothuroidea
- Order: Elasipodida
- Family: Pelagothuriidae
- Genus: Enypniastes
- Species: E. eximia

Binomial name
- Enypniastes eximia Théel, 1882

Synonyms
- List (Genus): Euriplastes Koehler & Vaney, 1905; Euryplastes Koehler & Vaney, 1905; Planktothuria Gilchrist, 1920; (Species): Enypniastes atlanticus (Heding, 1940); Enypniastes decipiens Koehler & Vaney, 1910; Enypniastes diaphana (Gilchrist, 1920); Enypniastes ecalcarea (Sluiter, 1901); Enypniastes globosa Hansen & Madsen, 1956; Enypniastes obscura (Koehler & Vaney, 1905); Euriplastes atlanticus Heding, 1940; Euriplastes obscura Koehler & Vaney, 1905; Pelagothuria Bouvieri Hérouard, 1906; Peniagone ecalcarea Sluiter, 1901; Planktothuria diaphana Gilchrist, 1920

= Enypniastes =

Enypniastes eximia

Genus of sea cucumbers

Enypniastes (Note: Koine Greek: ἐνυπνιαστής, romanized: enupniastḗs, lit. 'dreamer') is a genus of deep-sea sea cucumber. It is monotypic, being represented by the single species Enypniastes eximia. Due to its unique appearance, the species has been dubbed the headless chicken fish, headless chicken monster, and the Spanish dancer. It is also known as the swimming sea cucumber, and some are called the pink see-through fantasia.

== Description ==
Species in this genus have developed webbed fin-like structures at the front and back of their bodies which enable them to swim up off the surface of the sea floor and to journey as much as 1,000 m (3,300 ft) up into the water column. This is thought to help the animals move to new feeding grounds and avoid predators.

The sea cucumber ranges in size from 11 to 25 centimeters (4.3 to 9.8 in). Its most distinct feature is its coloring, which is dictated by size: small Enypniastes are a bright pink, and larger individuals are a more reddish-brown color. It is also semi-transparent, and its intestine can be seen through its body, especially after feeding. The Enypniastes have a round bulbous body, bifurcated tentacles, and a large anterior sail. They can also be bioluminescent.

== Distribution and habitat ==
The enypniastes can be found mainly in the benthic zone of the ocean. They can be found all over the globe in many different regions. They spend most of their time in the water column, touching down on the seafloor only to eat.

The first sighting in the southern ocean waters occurred in October 2018, when a team from Australia's Department of the Environment and Energy caught an image of E. eximia on a camera that had been deployed in seas near East Antarctica.

== Feeding ==
The Enypniastes feed mostly on benthic sediment. They feed by pushing food into their mouths with their tentacles. They feed very quickly, staying on the seafloor for at most sixty four seconds. Since that is mostly enough time to feed fully, the Enypniastes feed episodically.

== Movement ==
The Enypniastes move using a few methods. The first is that they move their anterior veil in a rowing motion. The second is that when there is a current, the organism will use their tentacles to pull themselves down current. They also move using a pushing motion with their tentacles.

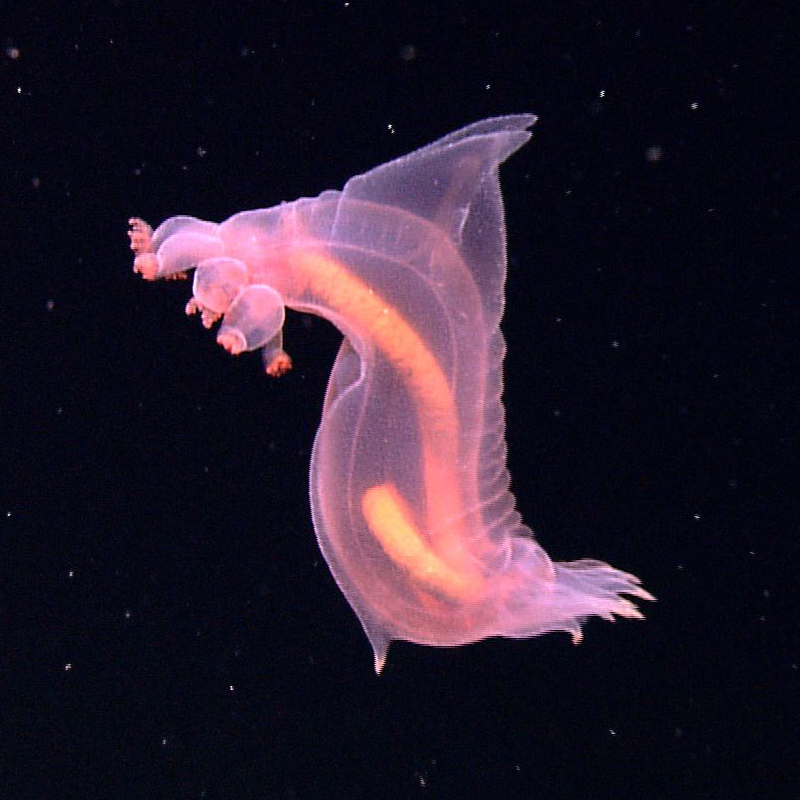
Enypniastes sp. showing bioluminescence at a depth of 3,200 metres

Video
