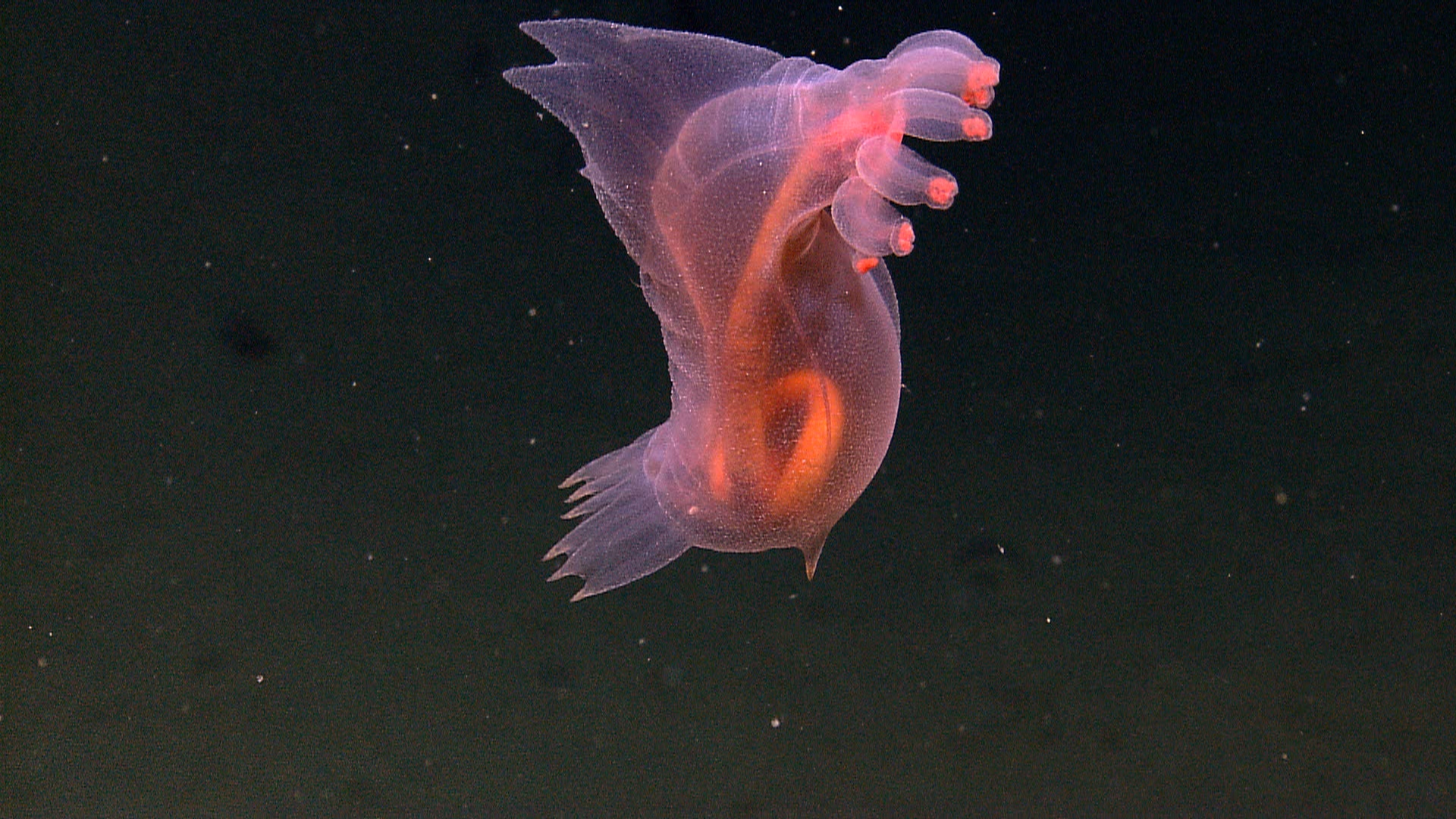
- Enypniastes eximia

Scientific classification
- Kingdom: Animalia
- Phylum: Echinodermata
- Class: Holothuroidea
- Order: Elasipodida
- Family: Pelagothuriidae; Ludwig, 1893

Type genus
- Pelagothuria Ludwig, 1893

Genera
- Enypniastes Théel, 1882; Pelagothuria Ludwig, 1893

Synonyms
- Enypniastidae Östergren, 1907; Planktothuridae Gilchrist, 1920; Planktothuriidae Gilchrist, 1920

= Pelagothuriidae =

Pelagothuriidae is a family of deep-sea swimming Sea cucumber. Members of this family are morphologically distinct from other sea cucumbers, possessing numerous appendages such as conical papillae and leaf-like tentacles. Most members of the order inhabit deep-sea environments, including species such as Enypniastes, and are benthopelagic, living in the water column just above the sea floor.

The species Pelagothuria natatrix is unique within the family as the only true pelagic holothurian, capable of surviving in open water and exhibiting jellyfish-like characteristics. It is also the only known true pelagic echinoderm.

== Classification ==
Family: Pelagothuriidae

- genus Enypniastes Théel, 1882
- genus Pelagothuria Ludwig, 1893

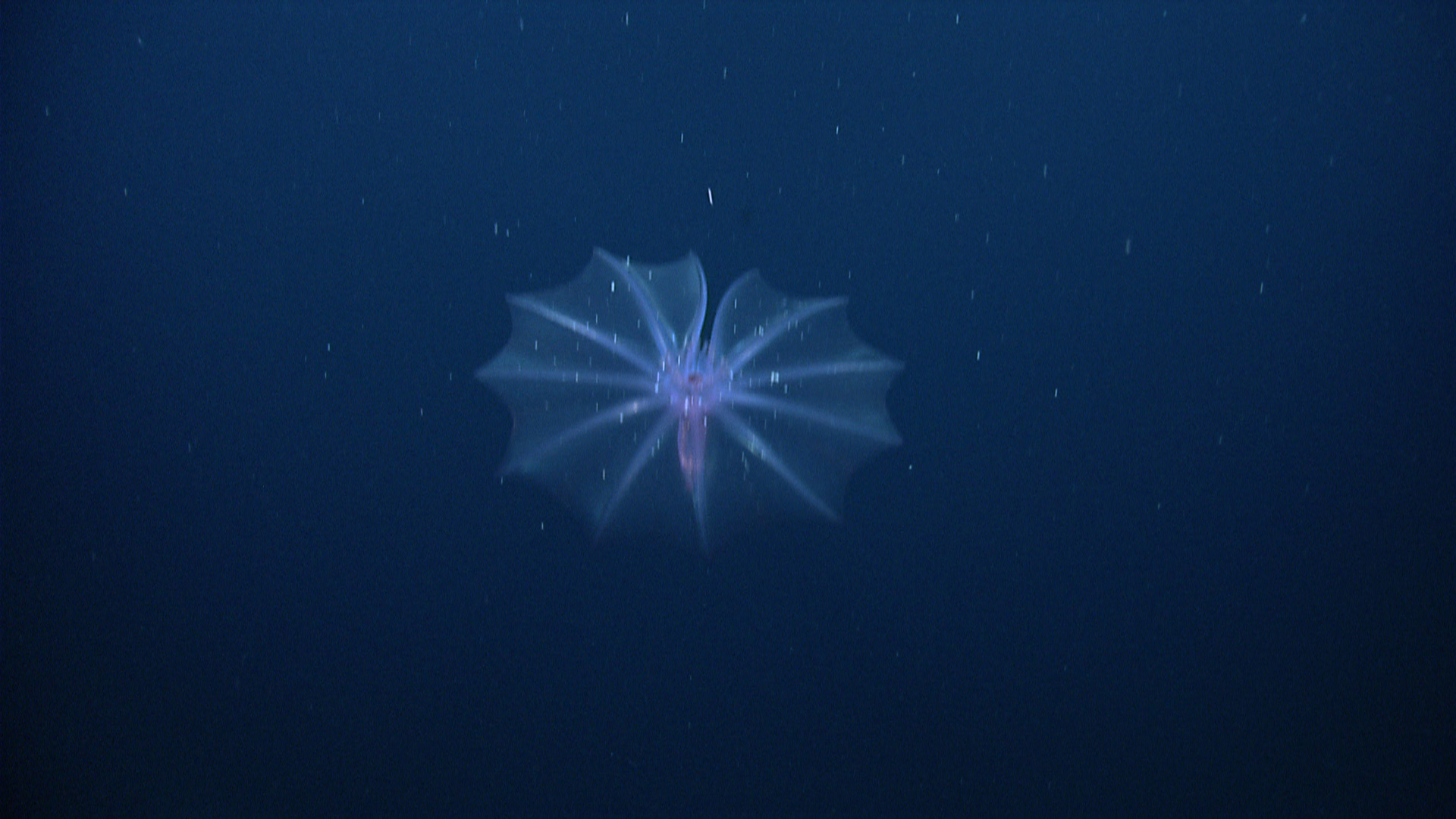
The only true pelagic echinoderm known to date : Pelagothuria natatrix (here close to the Galapagos).
