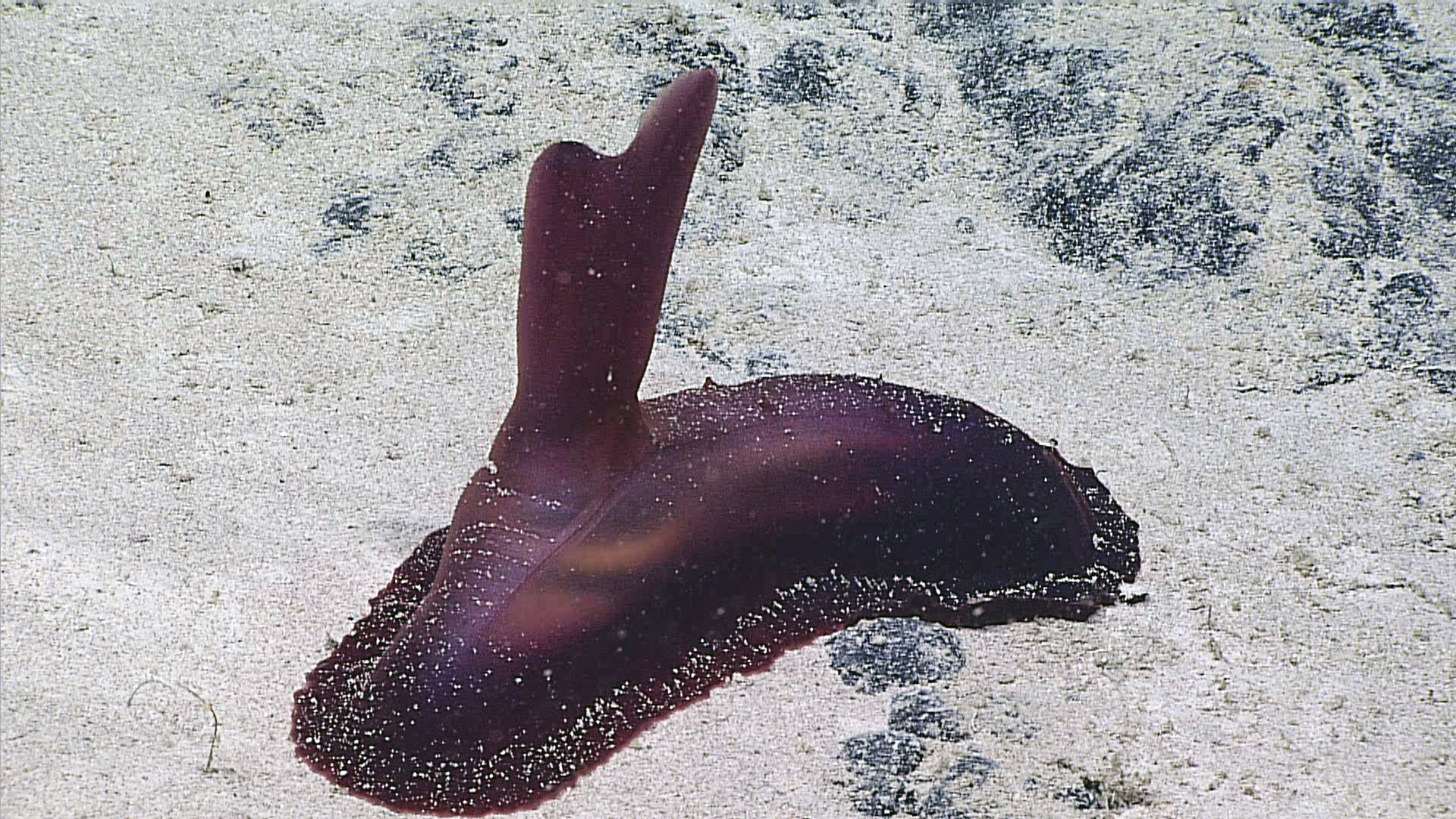
- Psychropotes semperiana

Scientific classification
- Kingdom: Animalia
- Phylum: Echinodermata
- Class: Holothuroidea
- Order: Elasipodida
- Family: Psychropotidae
- Genus: Psychropotes; Théel, 1882

Synonyms
- Euphronides Théel, 1882; Nectothuria Belyaev & Vinogradov, 1969; Triconus Hérouard, 1909

= Psychropotes =

Genus of sea cucumbers

Psychropotes is a genus of sea cucumbers in the family Psychropotidae. The members of this genus possess the ability to swim, although this is only facultative.

== Description ==
As adults, species of Psychropotes are roughly cylindrical in shape and red to violet in colour. They have a sail-like appendage which can be used for swimming during the larval stage, but is no longer needed when it is fully grown. Larvae of Psychropotes species are benthopelagic and swim around using the aforementioned appendage, however researchers are still trying to understand its use when the holothurian is fully grown. Larvae are transparent and can grow to around 2 cm long.

== Species ==
The following species are recognised in the genus Psychropotes:

- Psychropotes belyaevi Hansen, 1975
- Psychropotes depressa (Théel, 1882)
- Psychropotes dubiosa Ludwig, 1893
- Psychropotes dyscrita (Clark, 1920)
- Psychropotes fuscopurpurea Théel, 1882
- Psychropotes hyalinus Pawson, 1985
- Psychropotes longicauda Théel, 1882
- Psychropotes loveni Théel, 1882
- Psychropotes minuta (Koehler & Vaney, 1905)
- Psychropotes mirabilis Hansen, 1975
- Psychropotes monstrosa Théel, 1882
- Psychropotes moskalevi Gebruk & Kremenetskaia in Gebruk et al., 2020
- Psychropotes pawsoni Gebruk & Kremenetskaia in Gebruk et al., 2020
- Psychropotes raripes Ludwig, 1893
- Psychropotes scotiae (Vaney, 1908)
- Psychropotes semperiana Théel, 1882
- Psychropotes verrucicaudatus Xiao, Gong, Kou & Li, 2019
- Psychropotes verrucosa (Ludwig, 1894)
- Psychropotes xenochromata Rogacheva & Billett, 2009
