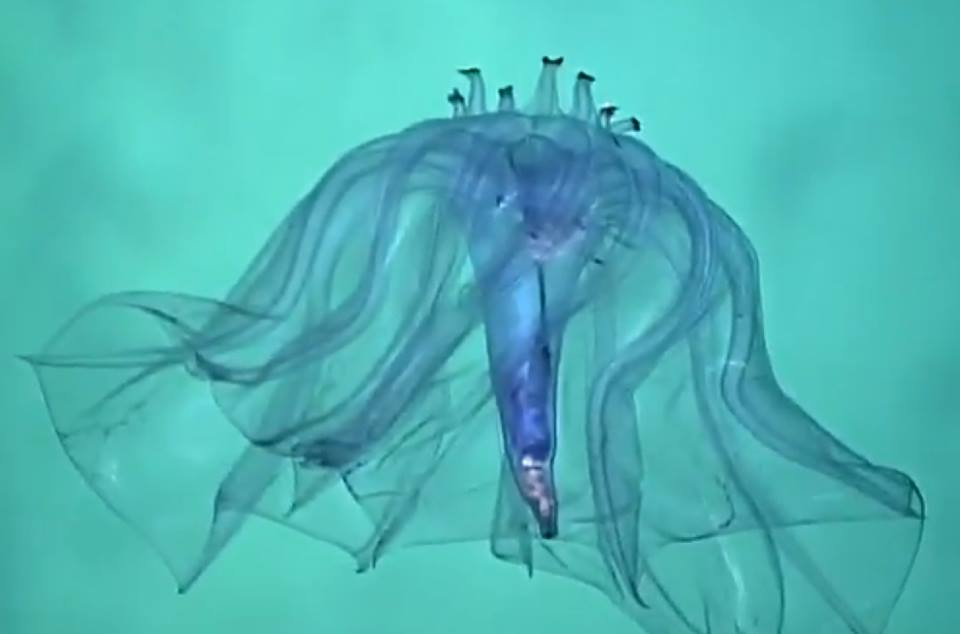

Scientific classification
- Kingdom: Animalia
- Phylum: Echinodermata
- Class: Holothuroidea
- Order: Elasipodida
- Family: Pelagothuriidae
- Genus: Pelagothuria; Ludwig, 1893
- Species: P. natatrix

Binomial name
- Pelagothuria natatrix Ludwig, 1893

= Pelagothuria =

Species of sea cucumber

Pelagothuria is a genus of sea cucumber in the family Pelagothuriidae. It is monotypic, being represented by the single species Pelagothuria natatrix.

== Characteristics ==
Pelagothuria is somewhat unusual in appearance in comparison with other sea cucumbers (and even within its family), as it looks more like a jellyfish with its large umbrella-like swimming structure supported by a ring of around 12 highly modified oral tentacles, its small tapered body and its swimming position with the mouth on top. The body is translucent with a pale purple pigmentation. The mouth is surrounded by around 15 short feeding tentacles like any sea cucumber, and the veil can be contracted like jellyfishes do (it is interrupted at the central ventral radius). The animal seems to reach around 16 cm in total diameter.

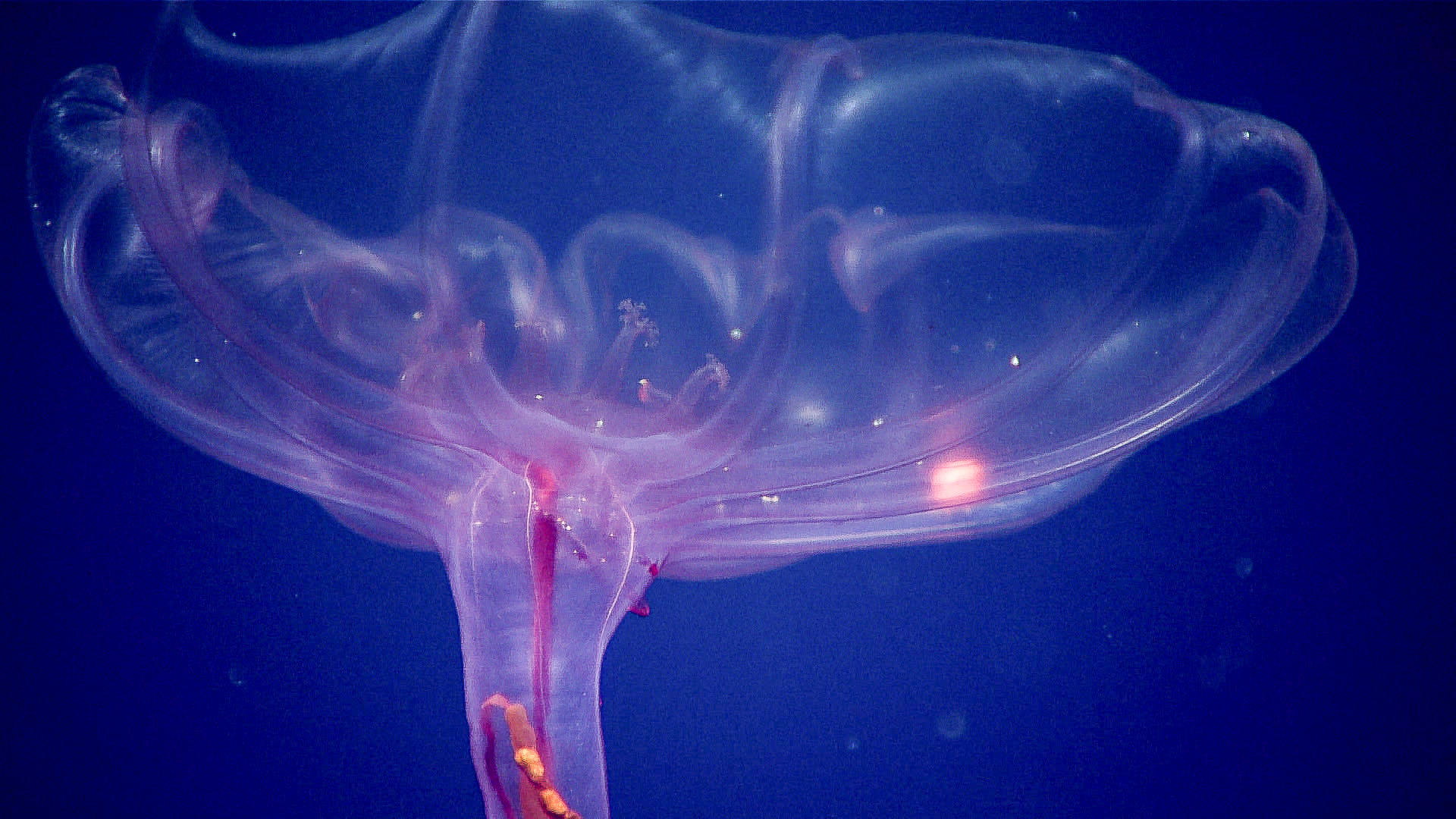
Observation at a depth of 1,400 metres (4,600 ft) in the central Pacific Ocean

This species constitutes the only true pelagic holothurian (and even echinoderm) known to date. However, its swimming seems mostly passive, more like slightly controlled drifting.

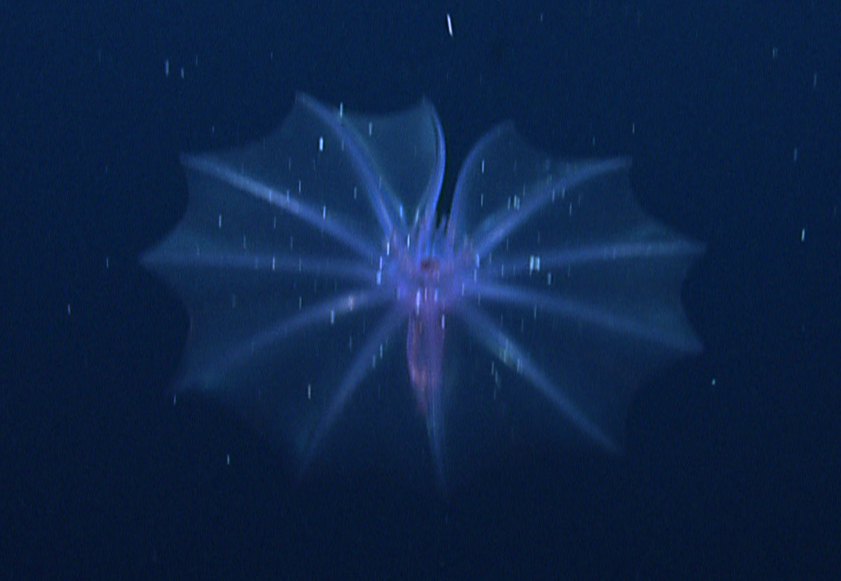
Pelagothuria natatrix observed in 2011 off the Galápagos Islands.

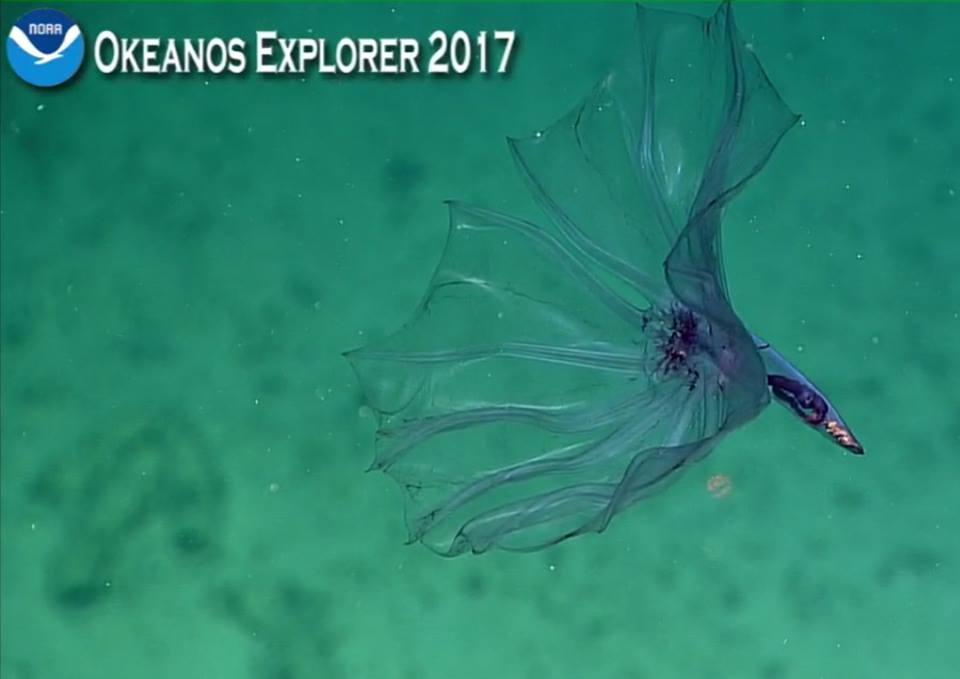
2017 observation off the Samoa islands.

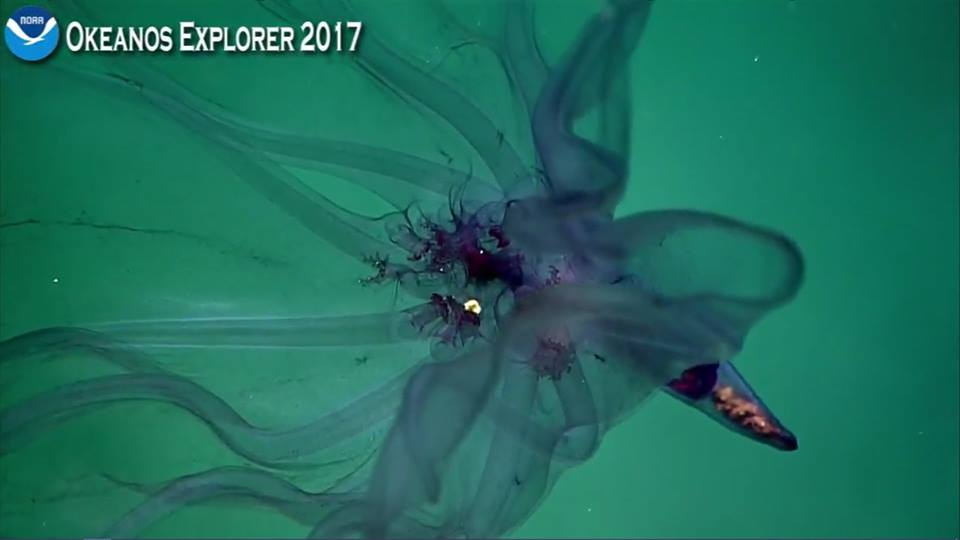
Closer view from same 2017 NOAA Okeanos Explorer observation

== Habitat and repartition ==
Pelagothuria is extremely rare, but its geographic range seems very wide: it has been collected in the Atlantic, Pacific and Indian Oceans, between 200 and 4,433 m of depth.

== Discovery ==
Pelagothuria was described by Hubert Jacob Ludwig in 1893 based on trawled specimens collected in 1891 by the USS Albatross between the Gulf of Panama and the Galápagos Islands (605–3,350 m deep).

It was not until 1989 that the first in situ footage of the species was obtained thanks to a scientific expedition in the Galapagos (542 m deep off San Cristóbal Island), followed by a scientific review of deep-sea swimming sea cucumbers from John Miller and David Pawson in 1990.

In 2011, the American scientific expedition NOAAS Okeanos Explorer photographed what scientists first believed to be an unknown jellyfish, but the picture was formally identified in 2014 by Smithsonian Institution experts Christopher Mah and David Pawson as Pelagothuria natatrix. A second observation was made in March 2017 by the same mission off the Samoa Islands (443 m deep near Howland Island), identified by NOAA expert Steve Auscavitch, and this time included a high-resolution video of the animal swimming in the water column.

Since then, more attention has been brought to this unusual species, and it has been observed more than 100 times by NOAA.
