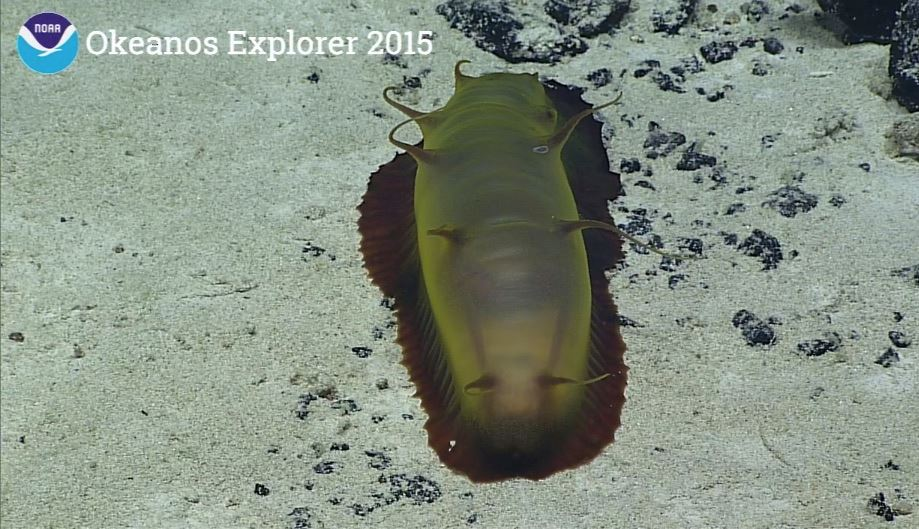
- Benthodytes in the family Psychropotidae

Scientific classification
- Kingdom: Animalia
- Phylum: Echinodermata
- Class: Holothuroidea
- Order: Elasipodida
- Family: Psychropotidae; Théel, 1882

Genera
- Benthodytes Théel, 1882; Psycheotrephes Théel, 1882; Psychropotes Théel, 1882

= Psychropotidae =

Family of sea cucumbers

Psychropotidae is a family of deep-sea swimming sea cucumbers. The geographic range of some psychropotids is very extensive at abyssal depths, whereas other species are found within more restricted ranges.

== Description ==
"Psychropotidae are elongate in shape, with the anterior part of the dorsal surface depressed. Many psychropotids have a large posterior appendage. They usually have 10-20 tentacles and ventrolateral radii, each with a single row of many small tube feet." Like all holothurians, psychropotids have calcareous deposits, vestigial elements of the usual Echinoderm skeleton. "In psychropotids, These are essentially similar to other Holothuroidea, differing in a very low degree of calcification", instead consisting mainly of connective tissue. The calcareous ring and spicules of Holothuroidea are useful in determining phylogeny, as they vary greatly and are believed to have evolved independently as species adapted to various biotopes. In psychropotidae there are usually four armed spicules with arms projecting inward and a single large central process projecting outwards. The calcareous ring is incomplete and has 5 independent parts. "The longitudinal axis of sclerites in papillae is transverse to the longitudinal axis of the papilla". "Concave sclerites of Laetmogonidae are probably homologous to concave cruciform sclerites of Elpidiidae and Psychropotidae". Sclerites can be absent in some specimens of the species Benthodytes typica and Benthodytes sanguinolenta. "In Elasipodida all three mesenteries suspending the intestine in the anterior and middle part of the body are attached to the body wall dorsally and only in the posterior part of the body, the mesentery holding the second descending part of the intestine enters the right ventral interradius and is attached to the body wall near the mediadorsal muscular band".

== Behavior ==
All psychropotidae can swim short distances, yet certain species, such as Psychropotes longicauda spend much of their juvenile phase in the pelagic zone. "Mortensen, 1927, speculated that 'The long tail probably is a swimming apparatus"; his suggestion is apparently true for juveniles of this species, but not for adults". Several authors describe the ability of a number of Psychropotes species to use a large, unpaired dorsal appendage as a 'sail' to move with the prevailing current, contorting their body so as to steer their movement. The great variation of this appendage throughout the Holothuroid family suggests that this adaptation is significant in allowing species to access food sources in the food-scarce environments in which they live. "Ostergren (1938) noted that most species in the Family Psychropotidae and some synallactids such as genus Paelopatides are darker in color ventrally than dorsally. He suggested that the differing colors may conceal swimming animals from predators above and below."

== Taxonomy ==
Using traditional taxonomic methods, Psychropotidae have been placed in the same taxon as the family Deimatidae. Recent molecular phylogenetic data, however, has suggested that the taxon is polyphyletic, with Deimatidae separated from all other Elasipoda families.

== Reproduction ==
"In the psychropotid species the ovary is a large thick-walled nodular structure containing oocytes with an interspecific maximum size of 1.2 mm to 3 mm". "In the psychropotids the testes are well-developed structures packed with spermatozoa except in those specimens that are infested with protozoan parasites". Hansen (1975) noted a maximum egg size of 4.4 mm for Psychropotes longicauda, the largest egg known in holothurians.
