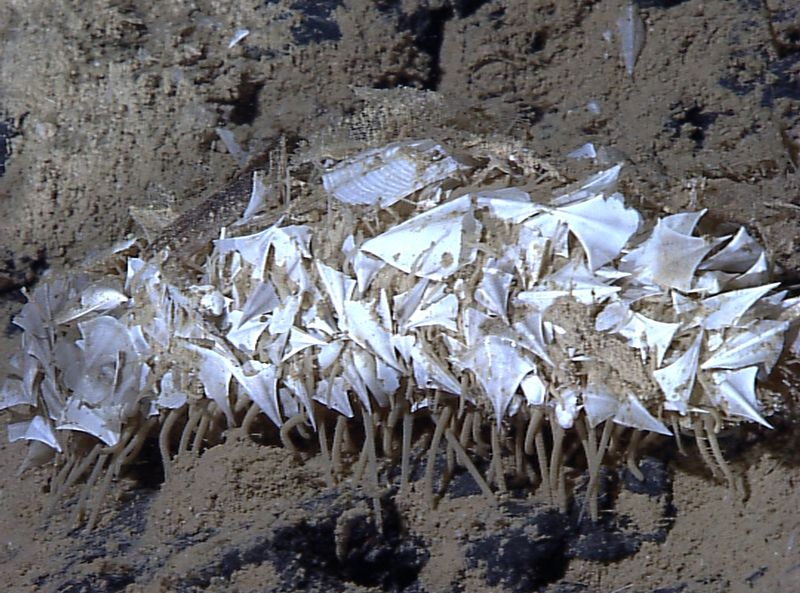
- Oloughlinius sp.

Scientific classification
- Domain: Eukaryota
- Kingdom: Animalia
- Phylum: Echinodermata
- Class: Holothuroidea
- Order: Persiculida; Miller, Kerr, Paulay, Reich, Wilson, Carvajal & Rouse, 2017

Families
- Gephyrothuriidae; Molpadiodemidae; Pseudostichopodidae; Persiculida incertae sedis

= Persiculida =

Clade of sea cucumbers

Persiculida is an order of sea cucumbers. Taxa within the order Persiculida were previously classified in an order called Aspidochirotida, which was determined to be polyphyletic in 2017.
