= Molpadiodemas =

Scientific classification
- Kingdom: Animalia
- Phylum: Echinodermata
- Class: Holothuroidea
- Order: Persiculida
- Family: Molpadiodemidae; Miller, Kerr, Paulay, Reich, Wilson, Carvajal & Rouse, 2017
- Genus: Molpadiodemas; Heding, 1935

Synonyms
- (Genus): Platystichopus Heding, 1940

Genus of sea cucumbers

Molpadiodemas is a genus of sea cucumbers belonging to the monotypic family Molpadiodemidae. The genus has an almost cosmopolitan distribution.

== Species ==
The following species are recognised in the genus Molpadiodemas:

- Molpadiodemas atlanticus (R.Perrier, 1898)
- Molpadiodemas constrictus O'Loughlin & Ahearn, 2005
- Molpadiodemas crinitus O'Loughlin & Ahearn, 2005
- Molpadiodemas depressus (Hérouard, 1902)
- Molpadiodemas epibiotus O'Loughlin & Ahearn, 2005
- Molpadiodemas helios O'Loughlin & Ahearn, 2005
- Molpadiodemas involutus (Sluiter, 1901)
- Molpadiodemas morbillus O'Loughlin & Ahearn, 2005
- Molpadiodemas neovillosus O'Loughlin & Ahearn, 2005
- Molpadiodemas pediculus O'Loughlin & Ahearn, 2005
- Molpadiodemas porphyrus O'Loughlin & Ahearn, 2005
- Molpadiodemas pustulosus (Sluiter, 1901)
- Molpadiodemas translucens O'Loughlin & Ahearn, 2005
- Molpadiodemas ustulatus O'Loughlin & Ahearn, 2005
- Molpadiodemas villosus (Théel, 1886)
- Molpadiodemas violaceus (Théel, 1886)
