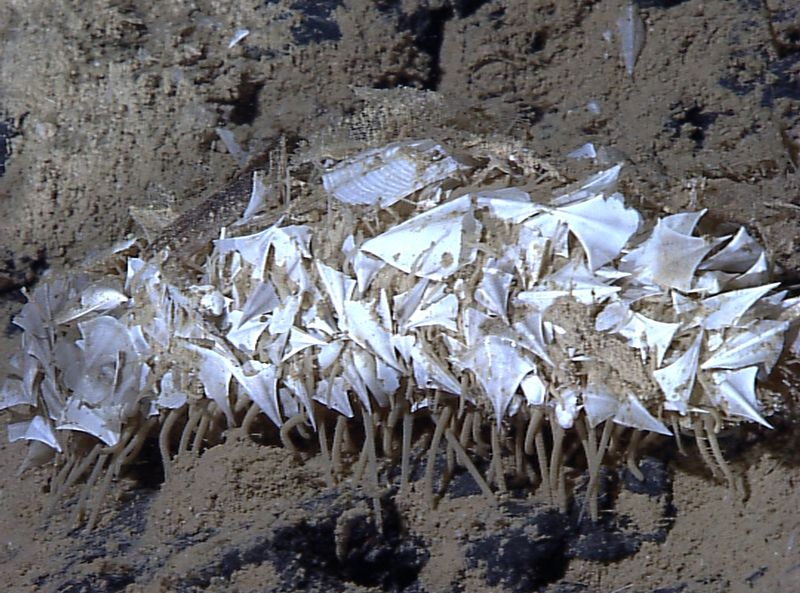
- Meseres sp.

Scientific classification
- Kingdom: Animalia
- Phylum: Echinodermata
- Class: Holothuroidea
- Order: Synallactida
- Family: Synallactidae; Haeckel, 1896

Genera
- See text

= Synallactidae =

Family of sea cucumbers

The Synallactidae are a family of sea cucumbers, part of the order Synallactida.

== Genera ==
- Allopatides Koehler & Vaney, 1905
- Amphigymnas Walsh, 1891
- Bathyplotes Östergren, 1896
- Capheira Ludwig, 1893
- Dendrothuria Koehler & Vaney, 1905
- Galatheathuria Hansen & Madsen, 1956
- Paelopatides Théel, 1886
- Pseudothuria Koehler & Vaney, 1905
- Scotothuria Hansen, 1978
- Synallactes Ludwig, 1894
