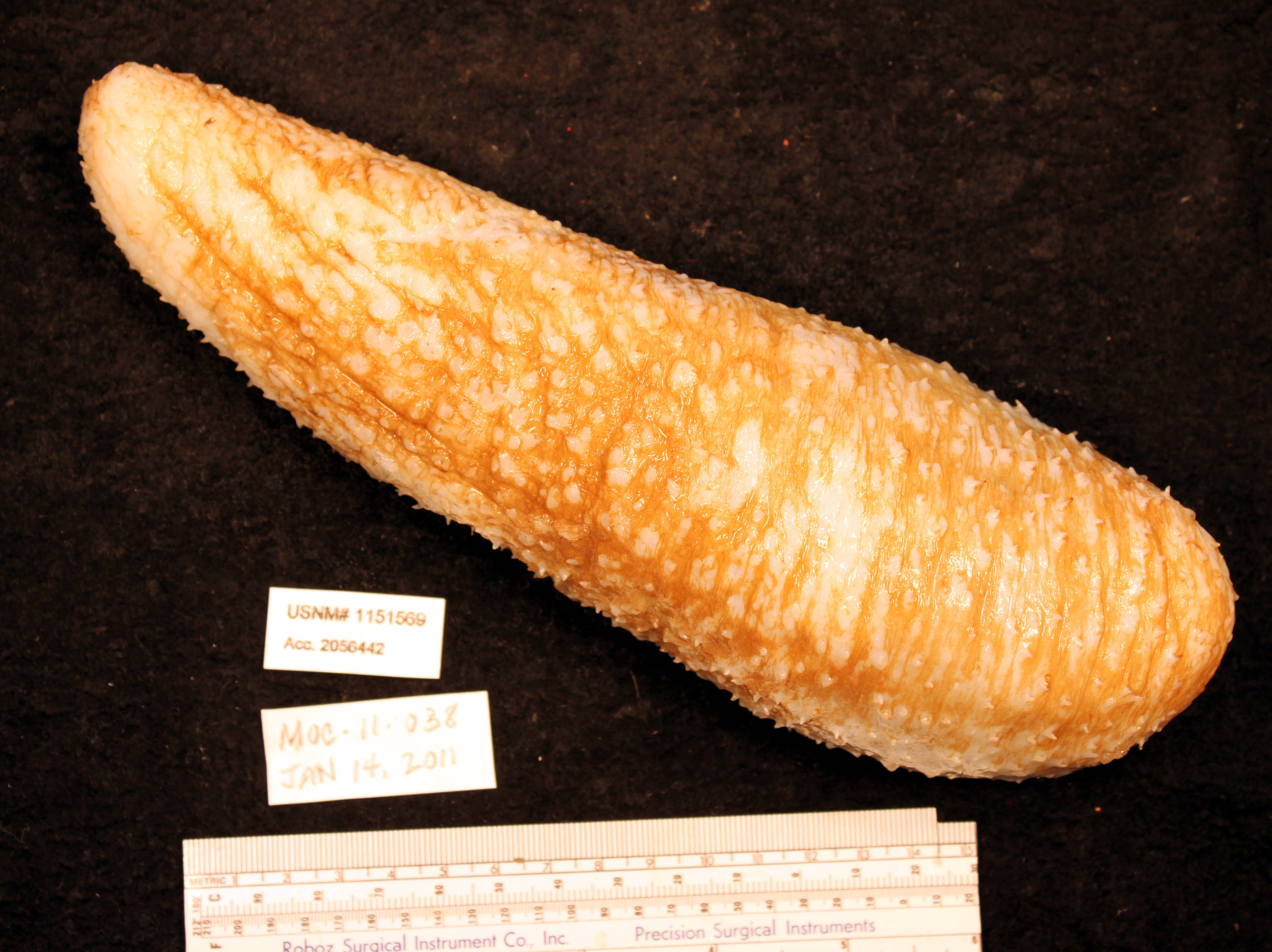
- Paroriza sp.

Scientific classification
- Kingdom: Animalia
- Phylum: Echinodermata
- Class: Holothuroidea
- Order: Persiculida
- Family: Gephyrothuriidae; Koehler & Vaney, 1905

Synonyms
- Gephyrothuriidae Deichmann, 1940

= Gephyrothuriidae =

Family of sea cucumbers

Gephyrothuriidae is a family of sea cucumbers belonging to the order Persiculida.

== Genera ==
Two genera are recognised in the family Gephyrothuriidae:

- Gephyrothuria Koehler & Vaney, 1905
- Paroriza Hérouard, 1902
