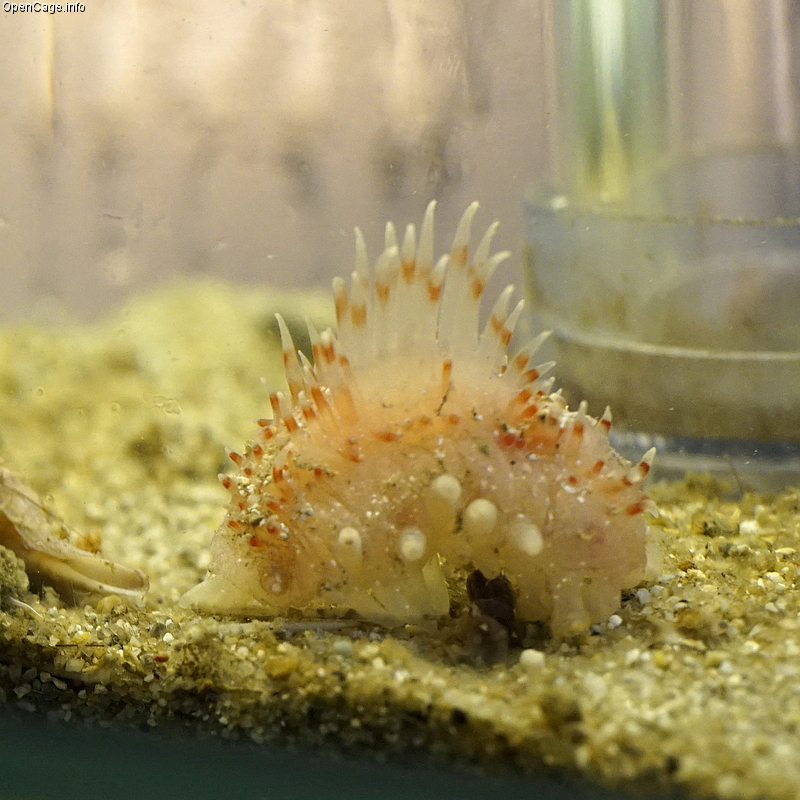
- Laetmogone maculata

Scientific classification
- Kingdom: Animalia
- Phylum: Echinodermata
- Class: Holothuroidea
- Order: Elasipodida
- Family: Laetmogonidae; Ekman, 1926

Synonyms
- †Palaeocaudinidae Boczarowski, 2001

= Laetmogonidae =

Family of sea cucumbers

Laetmogonidae is a family of sea cucumbers.

== Genera ==
The following genera are recognised in the family Laetmogonidae:

- Apodogaster Walsh, 1891
- Benthogone Koehler, 1895
- Gebrukothuria Rogacheva & Cross, 2009
- Laetmogone Théel, 1879
- †Palaeocaudina Boczarowski, 1997
- Pannychia Théel, 1882
- Psychronaetes Pawson, 1983
