= Johannes Leunis =

German clergyman, naturalist and botanist

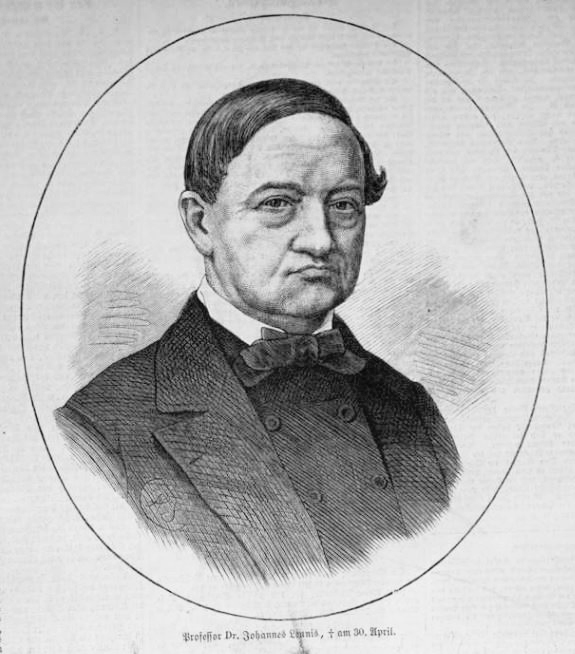
Johannes Leunis

Johannes Matthias Joseph Leunis (2 June 1802 – 30 April 1873) was a German clergyman, naturalist and botanist. He was a co-founder of the Roemer Museum in Hildesheim.

== Life and work ==
Leunis was born in Mahlerten to Flemish-origin farmer and shop-owner Ferdinand and his wife Dorothea née Plötze. He went to school in the Josephinum Gymnasium from 1815 and then went to study theology in 1822 and joined the Episcopal Seminarium.

He then joined the Josephinum as a teacher from 1824 and was ordained as a priest in 1826 at Paderborn. He was elected vicar in 1844. Leunis published several books on natural history particularly to meet the needs of the education system in Hanover that he was involved in reorganizing. He received an honorary doctorate from the University of Göttingen in 1855. Several of his books, particularly his Schulnaturgeschichte and Analytischer Leitfaden were in use as textbooks for half a century with several editions produced after his death. The third edition was completely rewritten by Hubert Ludwig (1852-1913). These books were noted for the use of keys for identifying animals and plants. A collection of natural history that Leunis established as the Leunis museum was bequeathed to the town of Hildesheim and this was merged into the Hermann-Roemer Museum in 1844. This was merged later with the Pelizaeus-Museum containing Egyptian artefacts into the Roemer-Pelizaeus-Museum in 1958. He was elected into the Leopoldina Academy in 1861.

Leunis died following complications after a stroke. A museum in his memory was opened in 1914 at the Josephinum Gymnasium and plant genus Leunisia was named in his honour. A street in Hildesheim is named in his memory.

The standard author abbreviation Leunis is used to indicate this person as the author when citing a botanical name.
