= Hubert Ludwig =

German zoologist and marine biologist

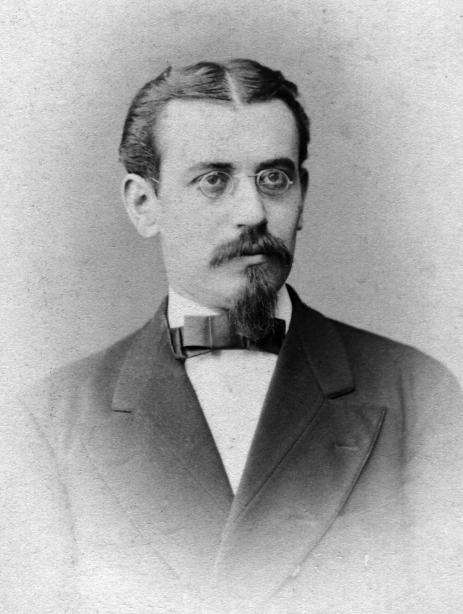
Around 1880. From Museum für Naturkunde, Berlin

Hubert Jakob Ludwig (22 March 1852 – 17 November 1913) was a German zoologist and marine biologist best known for his studies of echinoderms. He also rewrote and produced the third edition of the textbook of zoology written by Johannes Leunis in 1883.

Ludwig was born in Trier in the Kingdom of Prussia where his father Jakob was a goldsmith. Ludwig went to the local Gymnasium before studying medicine at Würzburg from 1871. He then shifted to the study of zoology after attending the classes of Carl Semper (1832–1893). His doctorate in 1874 was on egg development in the animal kingdom. He then became an assistant at the University of Göttingen under Ernst Ehlers and completed his habilitation in 1875 and became a privatdozent. In 1878 he moved to Bremen as the director of the state collections of natural history and ethnography (now the Übersee-Museum Bremen). In 1881 he joined Giessen University as a professor of zoology and in 1887 he shifted to Bonn University where he worked until his death from pneumonia. He became a rector for the university in 1901–2. At the university he was involved in the admission of women researchers resulting in Maria Countess von Linden becoming the first woman research assistant. He was elected to the Deutsche Akademie der Naturforscher Leopoldina in 1881. In 1897 he spent some time at the Naples marine biological research station. His most well known publication was the monograph on the Holothuroidea, Die Seewalzen, which was published as part of the series of Heinrich Georg Bronn's Klassen und Ordnungen des ThierReichs ("Classes and Orders of the Animal Kingdom"). Ludwig's students included August Reichensperger, Michael Britten, Ernst Siegfried Becher, Wilhelm J. Schmidt , Willy Erwe, Wilhelm Adolf Reiffen, and August Ackermann.
