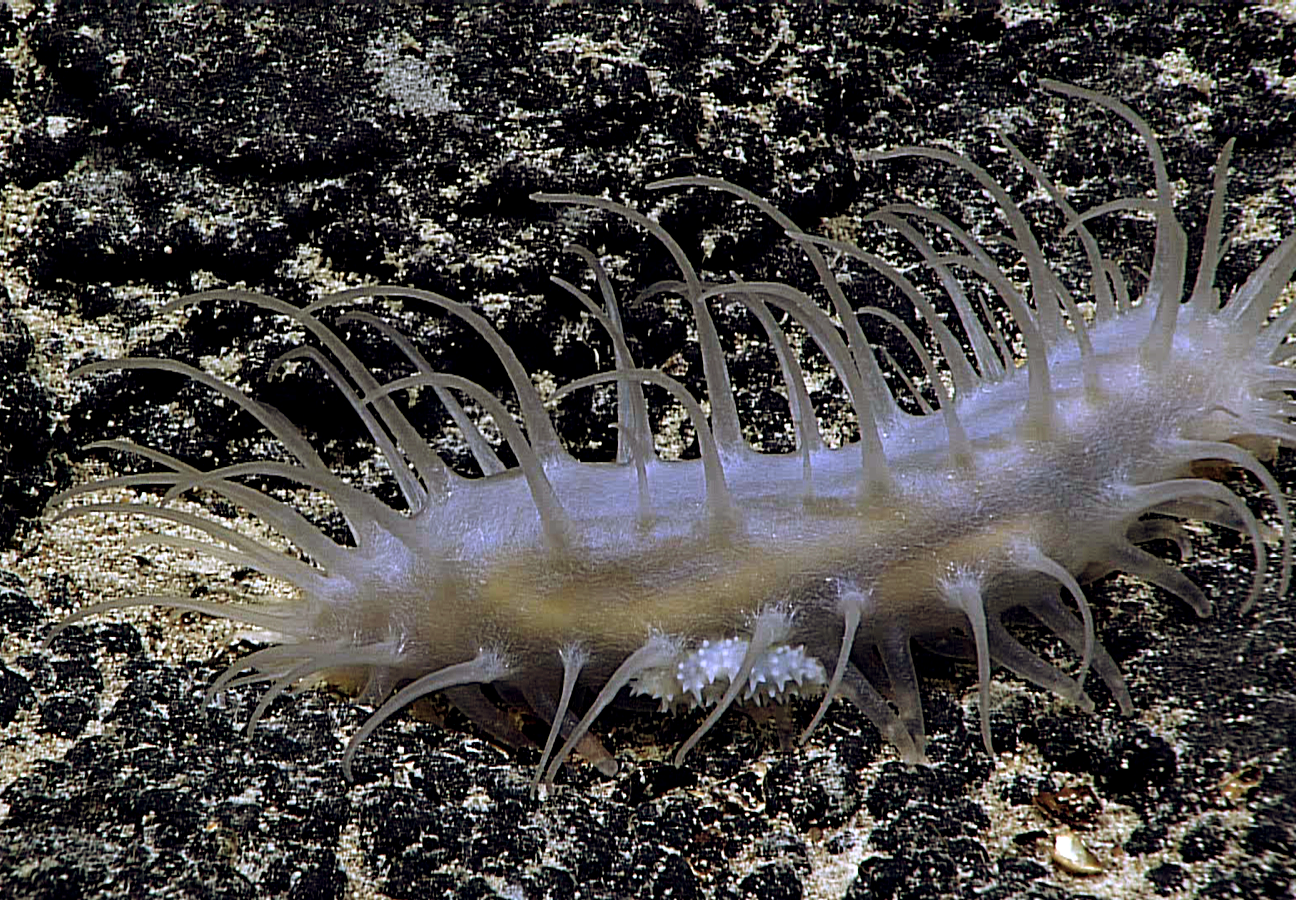
- Oneirophanta sp.

Scientific classification
- Kingdom: Animalia
- Phylum: Echinodermata
- Class: Holothuroidea
- Order: Synallactida
- Family: Deimatidae; Théel, 1882

= Deimatidae =

Family of sea cucumbers

Deimatidae is a family of sea cucumbers belonging to the clade Synallactida.

== Genera ==
The following genera are recognised in the family Deimatidae:

- Deima Théel, 1879
- Oneirophanta Théel, 1879
- Orphnurgus Théel, 1879
