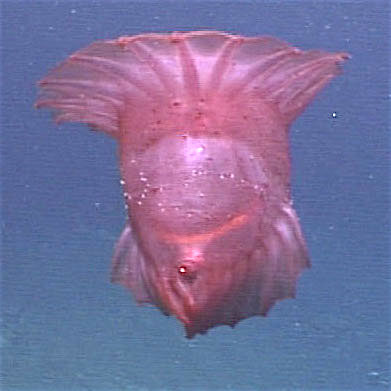
- Enypniastes sp.

Scientific classification
- Kingdom: Animalia
- Phylum: Echinodermata
- Class: Holothuroidea
- Order: Elasipodida; Théel, 1882

Families
- See Text

= Elasipodida =

Order of sea cucumbers

Elasipodida is an order of sea cucumbers. They have numerous appendages, including conical papillae and leaf-like tentacles. Although many species are benthic, a number are pelagic, and may have their appendages modified to form sails or fins. Most members of the order inhabit deep-sea environments, such as the species of the genus Enypniastes.

== Classification ==
The following families are recognised in the order Elasipodida:

- family Elpidiidae Théel, 1882
- family Laetmogonidae Ekman, 1926
- family †Palaeolaetmogonidae Reich, 2012
- family Pelagothuriidae Ludwig, 1893
- family Psychropotidae Théel, 1882
- family Deimatidae? Théel, 1882 Synonym of Benthodytes, Psycheotrephes, and Psychropotes.
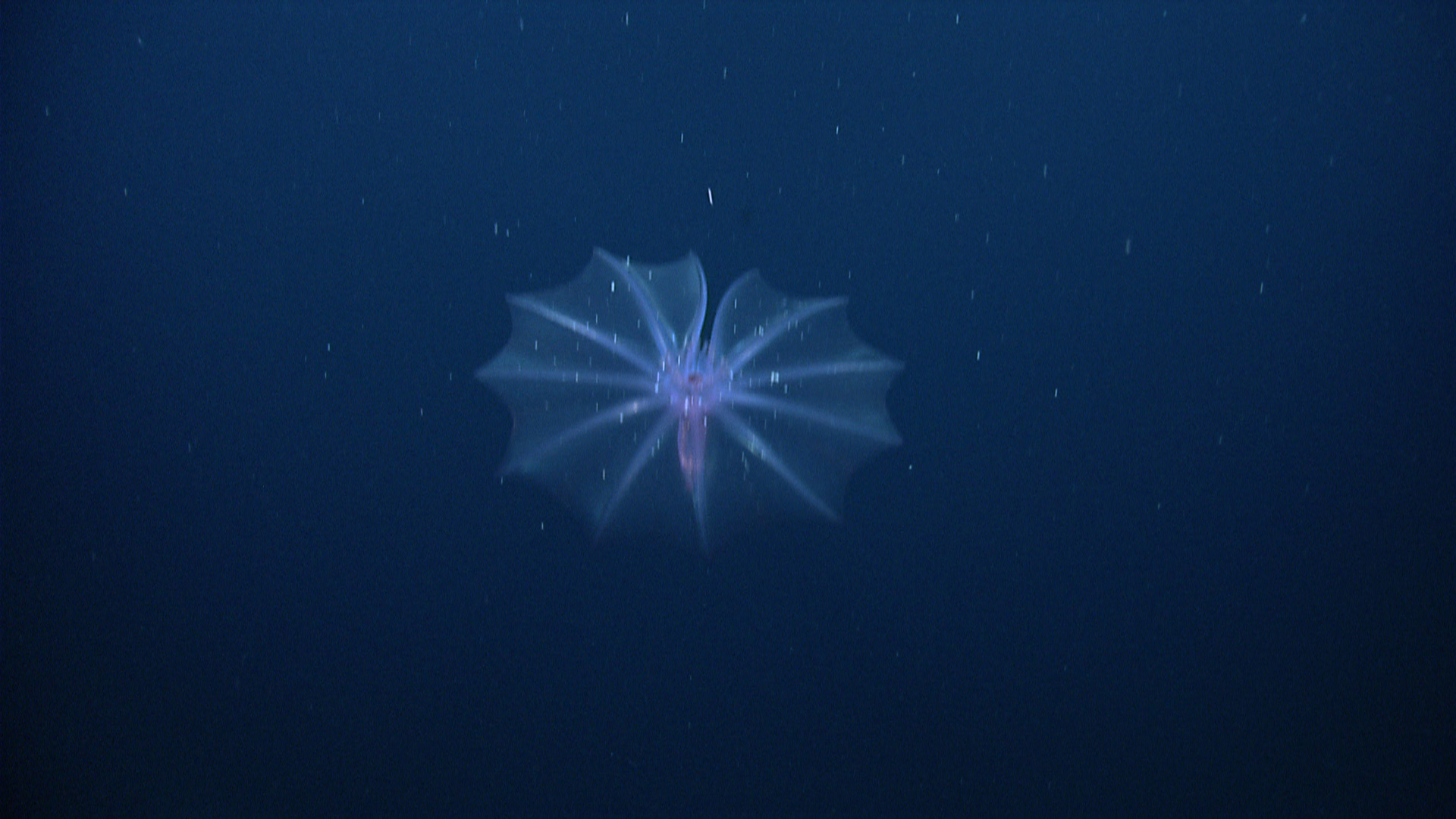
The only true pelagic echinoderm known to date: Pelagothuria natatrix (here close to the Galápagos).

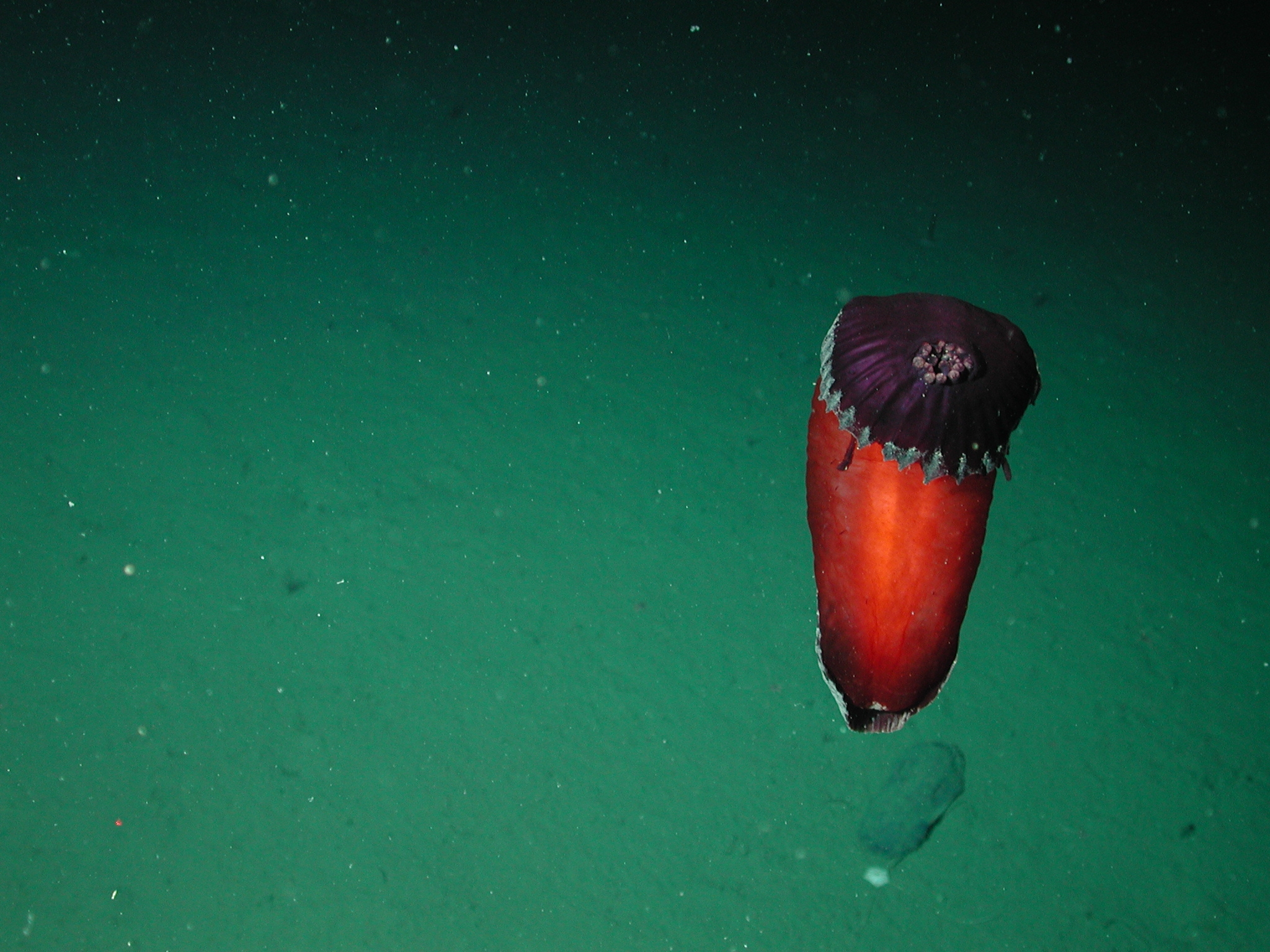
Benthodytes sp.

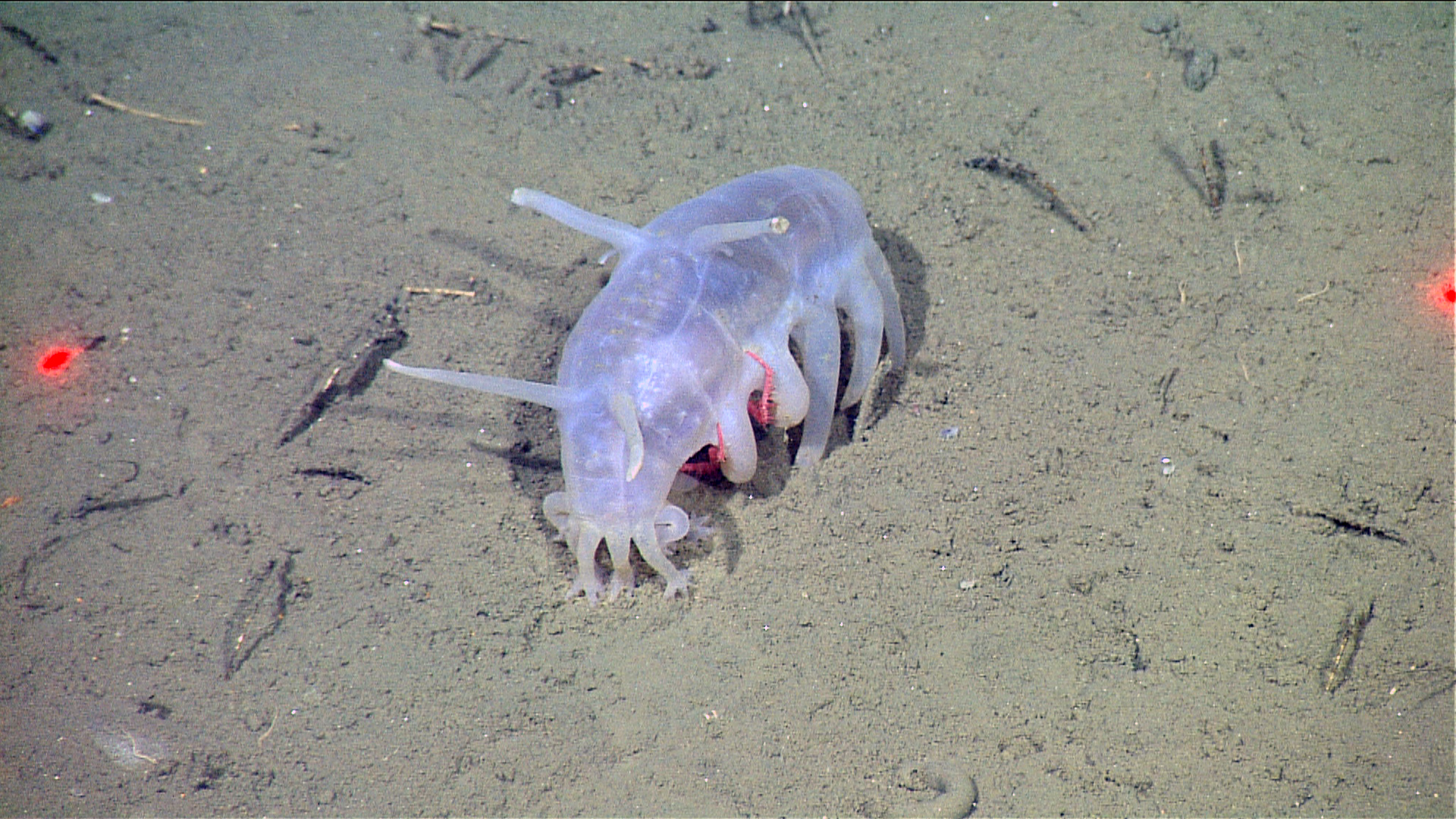
Scotoplanes globosa (a.k.a. "sea pig", family Elpidiidae)

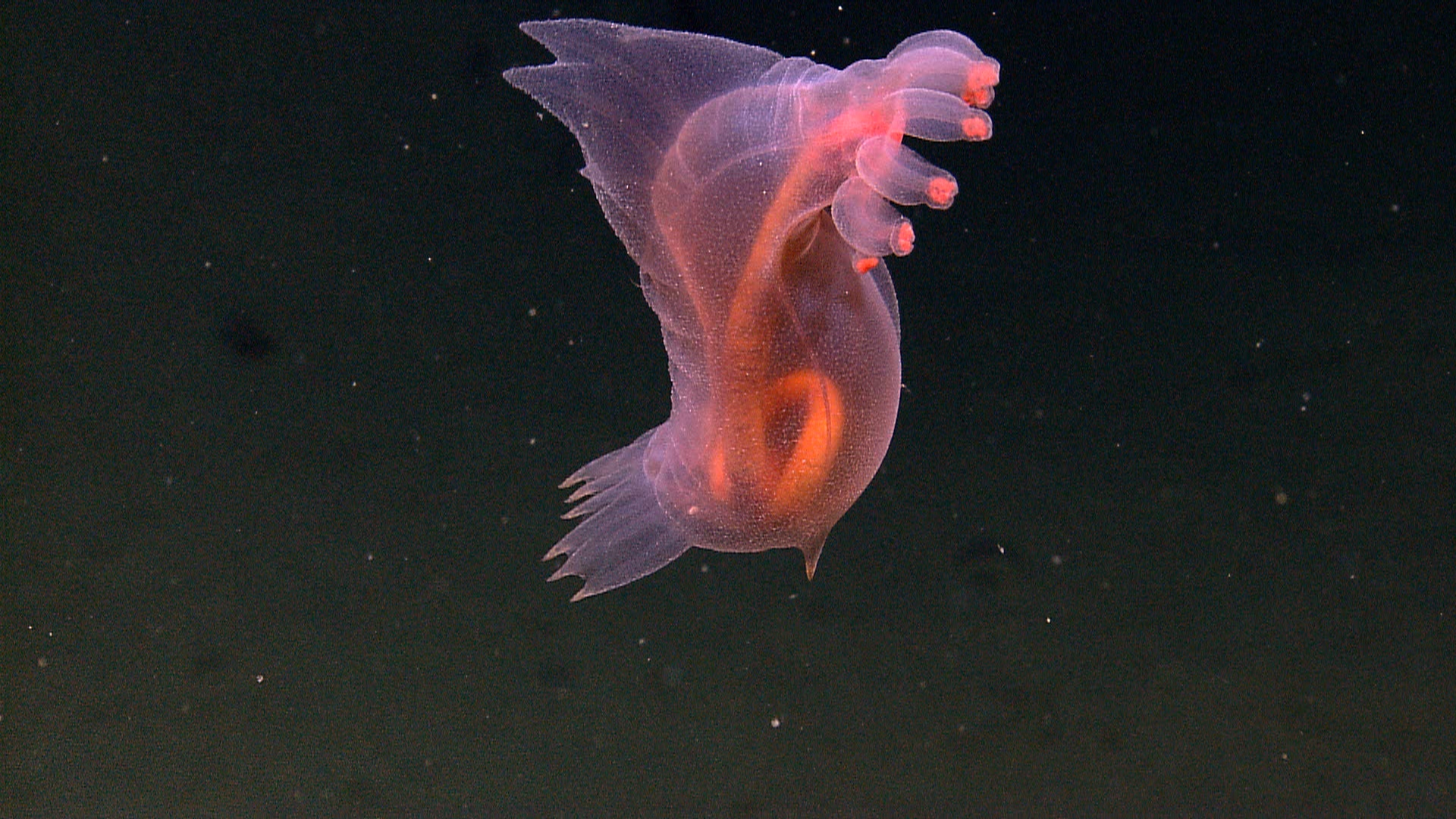
A Pelagothuriidae

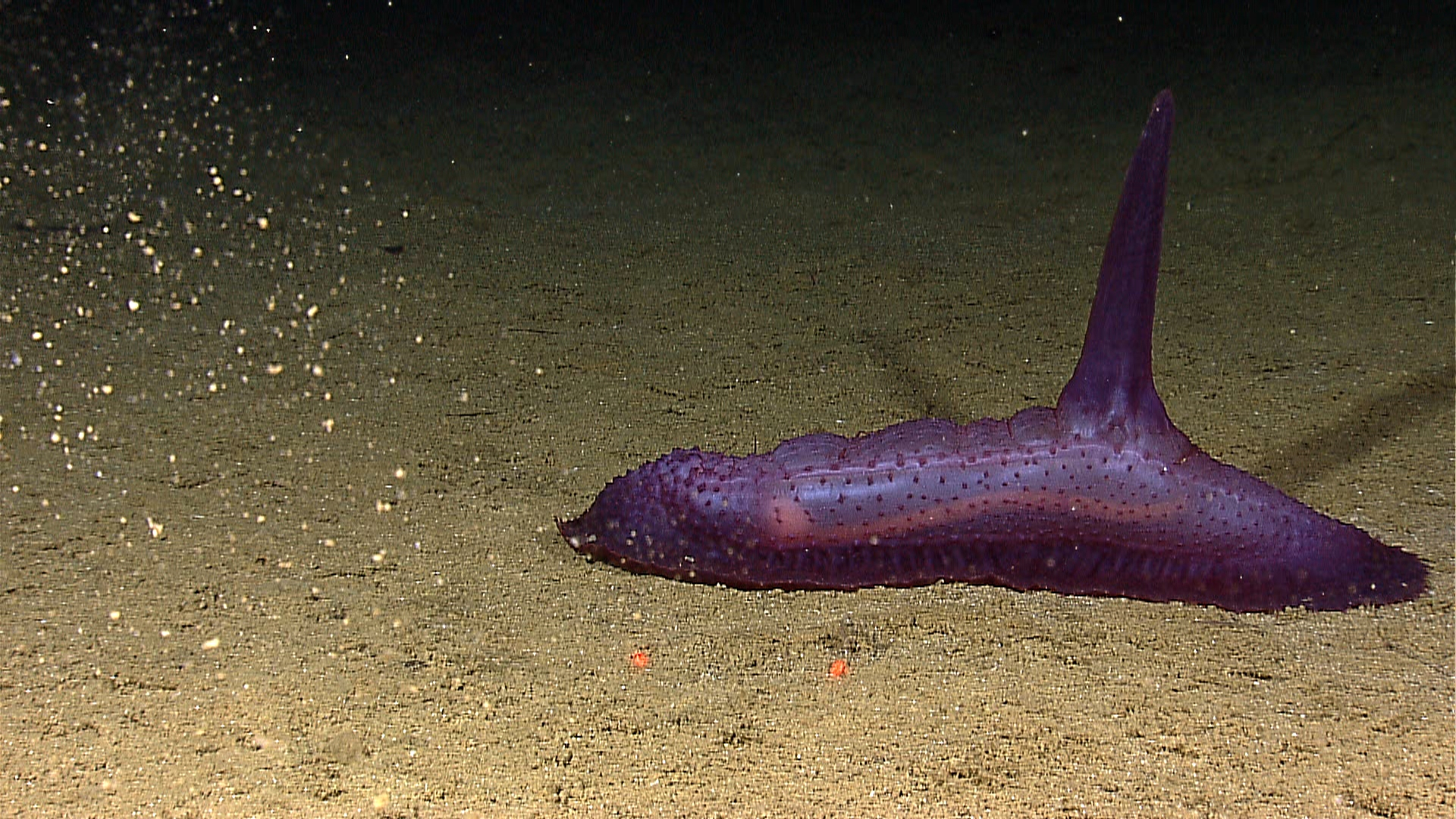
A Psychropotidae

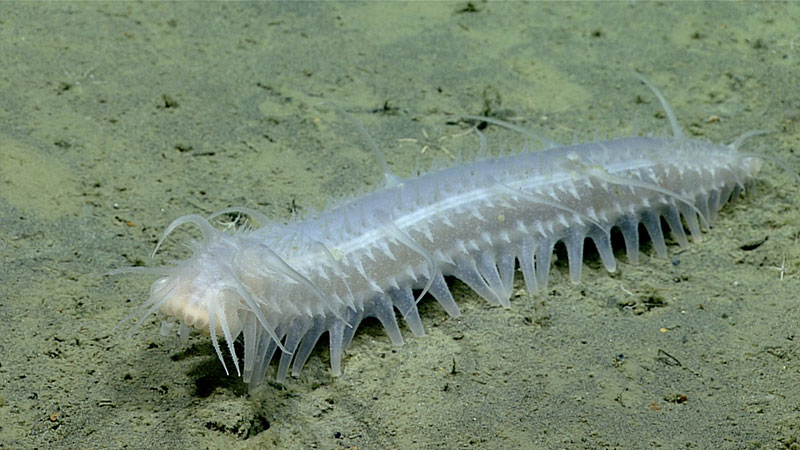
Pannychia sp. (Laetmogonidae)
