= Johan Hjalmar Théel =

Swedish zoologist and university professor

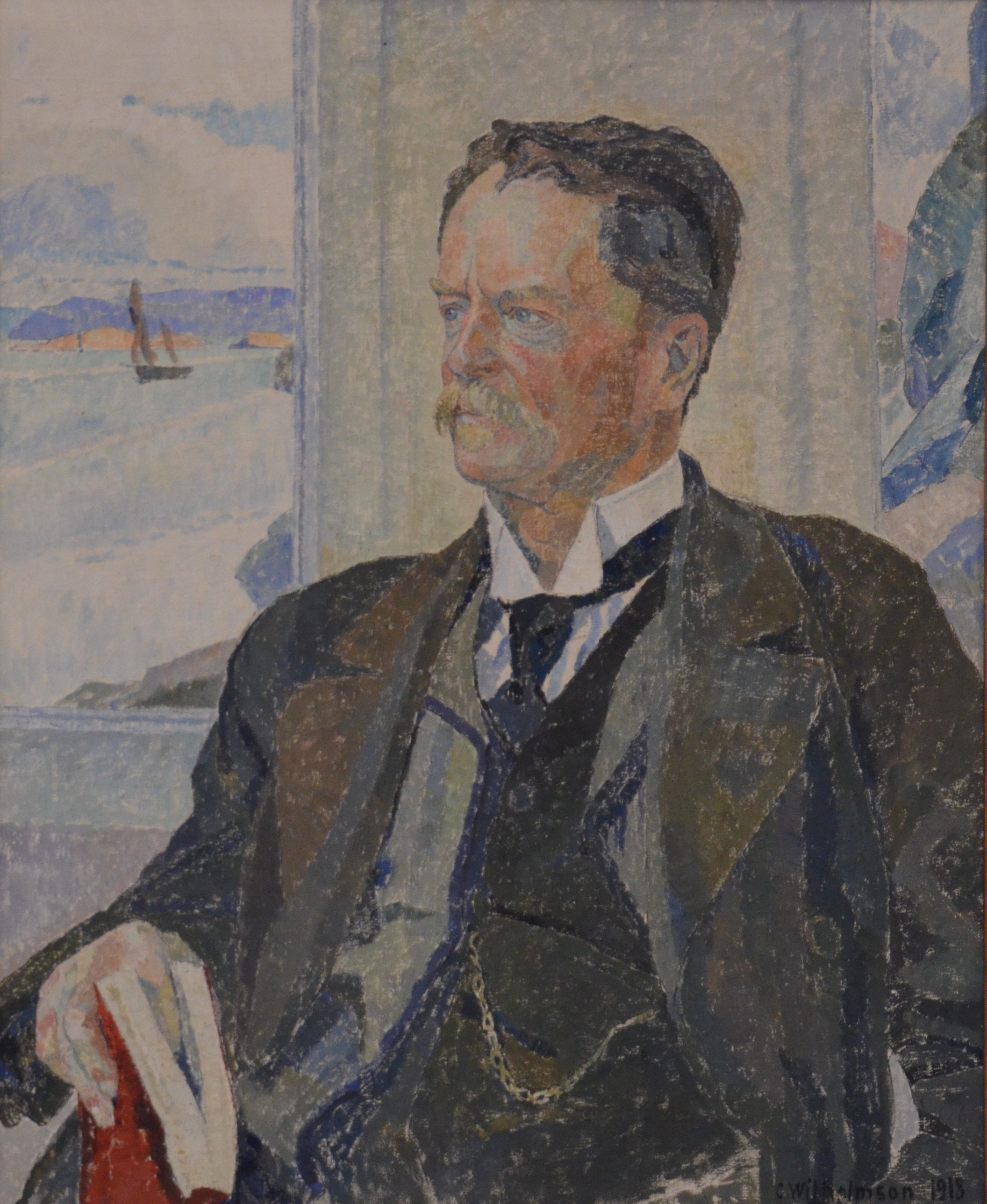
Carl Wilhelmson's portrait of Hjalmar Théel, painted in 1913

Johan Hjalmar Théel (14 June 1848 – 20 July 1937) was a Swedish zoologist and university professor.

== Early life ==
Théel was born on 14 June 1848 in Säter, Sweden. He used to go on hunting trips along the coast of Norway in his youth and became fascinated by the plants and animals he encountered, especially the marine life. He met the zoologist Sven Ludvig Lovén who sparked his interest in sipunculid or peanut worms, especially the genus Phascolion. He studied at Uppsala University and Phascolion was the subject for his thesis, written in 1875. He was also an artist and included his own illustrations in his published articles. In 1875, he accompanied the explorer Adolf Erik Nordenskiöld to the mouth of the Yenisei River in an attempt to find the Northeast Passage. He joined him on a similar voyage the following year and discovered a sea cucumber new to science, which he named Elpidia glacialis. He was inducted into the Royal Swedish Academy of Sciences in 1884.

== Career ==
Théel became a lecturer at Uppsala University and was appointed professor of zoology in 1889. He was curator of the invertebrate department of the Swedish Museum of Natural History from 1892 to 1916 and was involved in cataloguing the large collection of northern and Arctic marine invertebrates. He also became director of the Kristinebergs Zoological Station at Fiskebäckskil in 1892, remaining in this post until 1908.

Théel was asked to classify the sea cucumbers, class Holothuroidea, that had been collected during the Challenger expedition, a British scientific expedition that investigated the deep sea and its fauna. He published his findings in the "Report on the Scientific Results of the Exploring Voyage of HMS Challenger 1873–76". His report came in two parts. The first (1881) deals with the order Elasipodida and is fundamental to the knowledge of this group, and the second (1885) covers other holothurians. Théel died on 20 July 1937 in Stockholm, Sweden.

== See also ==
- Pannychia moseleyi
