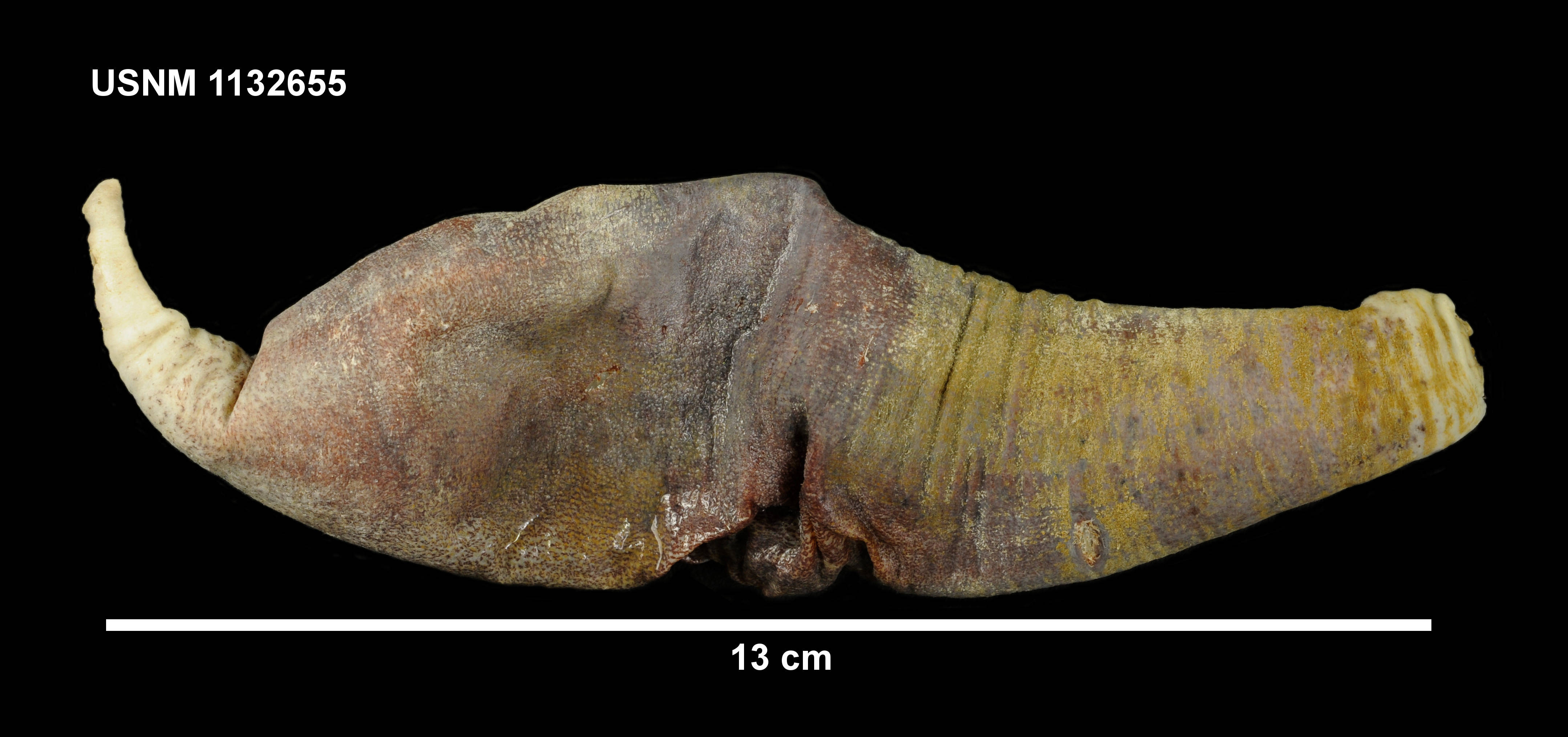
- Preserved specimen

Scientific classification
- Domain: Eukaryota
- Kingdom: Animalia
- Phylum: Echinodermata
- Class: Holothuroidea
- Order: Molpadida
- Family: Molpadiidae
- Genus: Molpadia
- Species: M. musculus

Binomial name
- Molpadia musculus Risso, 1826

Synonyms
- Ankyroderma danielsseni Théel, 1886; Ankyroderma hispanicum Petit, 1883; Ankyroderma loricatum Perrier R., 1898; Ankyroderma musculus (Risso, 1826); Ankyroderma perrieri Petit, 1883; Eumolpadia asaphes Heding, 1935; Haplodactyla mediterranea Grube, 1840; Molpadia danielsseni Théel, 1886; Molpadia loricata (R. Perrier, 1898); Trochostoma violaceum Théel, 1886

= Molpadia musculus =

Species of sea cucumber

Molpadia musculus is a species of sea cucumber in the family Molpadiidae. It is found in deep waters in the Atlantic Ocean, burrowing in the mud.

== Distribution and habitat ==
Molpadia musculus is found in the northern Atlantic Ocean at depths of about 2,000 to 5,000 m (6,600 to 16,400 ft). It lives buried in the mud on the seabed with its anterior (mouth end) directed downwards and its posterior (rear end) on the surface of the sediment. This sea cucumber can be very common on the deep seabed, with up to 220 per square metre having been recorded.

== Ecology ==
Molpadia musculus is a detritivore, ingesting the mud through which it burrows, extracting the nutritious fragments as the mud passes through the gut and voiding the rest onto the surface of the sediment. The mud has a high content of bacteria, archaea and other prokaryote organisms, especially the top centimetre. There is also a large diversity of micro-organisms present in the sea cucumber's gut; however, research has shown that the fauna of the gut are different from the fauna present in the sediment. To provide an explanation for this, the researchers hypothesized that the fauna in the gut were living there as commensals, to the mutual benefit of themselves and the sea cucumber. It seems that the sea cucumber does not need to build up a gut community of bacteria where the sediment is rich in organic matter, as in the Nazaré Canyon, but such a community is necessary where the sediment quality is poor as in the Cascais Canyon.

Like other sea cucumbers, Molpadia musculus is gonochoric, with separate sexes. Fertilisation is external, the larvae are planktonic and settle on the seabed when sufficiently developed, undergoing metamorphosis into juveniles.
