= Caudina arenicola =

Scientific classification
- Kingdom: Animalia
- Phylum: Echinodermata
- Class: Holothuroidea
- Order: Molpadida
- Family: Caudinidae
- Genus: Caudina
- Species: C. arenicola

Binomial name
- Caudina arenicola (Stimpson, 1857)

Species of echinoderm

Caudina arenicola (common name sweet potato sea cucumber) is a species of sea cucumber of the family Caudinidae. The species was described in the Boston Journal of Natural History by American marine biologist William Stimpson in 1857.
