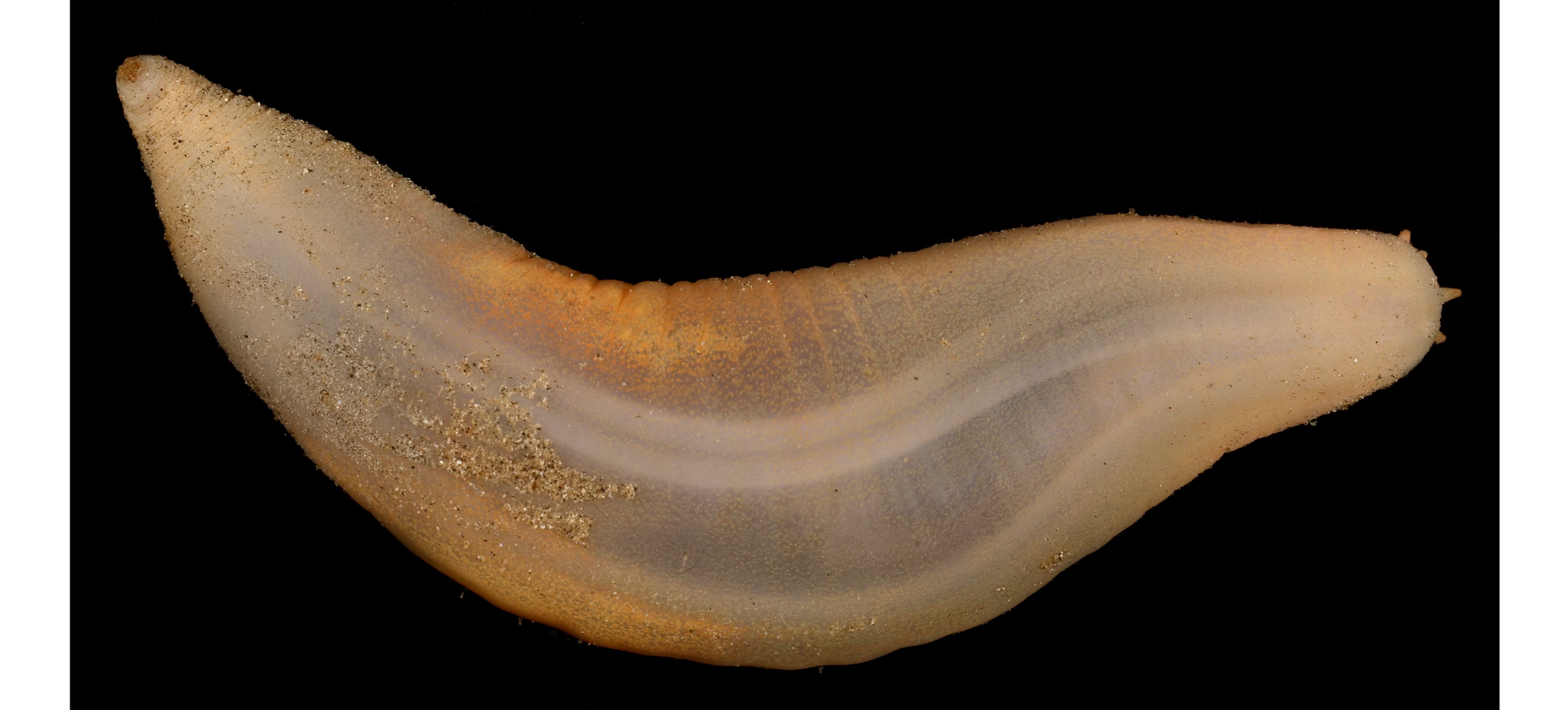
- Acaudina molpadioides

Scientific classification
- Kingdom: Animalia
- Phylum: Echinodermata
- Class: Holothuroidea
- Order: Molpadida
- Family: Caudinidae
- Genus: Acaudina; H.L. Clark, 1908

Species
- A. bacilla; A. demissa; A. leucoprocta; A. molpadioides; A. pellucida; A. punctata; A. rosettis; A. spinifera; A. suspecta

= Acaudina =

Genus of sea cucumbers

Acaudina is a genus of sea cucumbers of the family Caudinidae. They are small, smooth and spindle-shaped, with a thin body wall and are distinguished by their absence of a caudal appendage.

Acaudina are found in tropical and subtropical waters, with habitats ranging from intertidal and estuarine zones including reefs, sandbars, seagrass meadows or within soft-bottom and anoxic mudflats, where salinity is slightly reduced. They are benthic detritivores, which ingest sediments to extract organic matter and hence play an ecological role as bioturbators.

== Etymology ==
The genus was established by Hubert Lyman Clarke in 1907, to accommodate a species that is markedly different from other related genera within the order Molpadida. Its name is derived from the Latin "a", combined with "caudina", referring to the absence of a caudal (tail) appendage that is present in similar genera such as Caudina. This notable difference in the posterior body region was what led to its recognition as a separate genus.

It has been synonymized with the name Aphelodactyla (H. L. Clark, 1908), but this name is unaccepted.

== Taxonomy ==
Acaudina belong to the order Molpadida of sea cucumbers which do not have feeding feet apart from their tentacles. They are considered as apodous holthurians, which are slim, vermiform and have thin body walls.

The type species is Molpadia demissa Sluiter, 1901, later recognised as Acaudina demissa. This was originally described from a preserved specimen collected from the Madura Strait in Java. The species listed on WoRMS are as follows:

- Acaudina bacilla (Cherbonnier & Féral, 1981)
- Acaudina demissa (Sluiter, 1901)
- Acaudina leucoprocta (H.L. Clark, 1938)
- Acaudina molpadioides (Semper, 1867) (syn. Aphelodactyla delicata, Clark 1908, unaccepted)
- Acaudina pellucida (Semper, 1867)
- Acaudina punctata (Sluiter, 1887)
- Acaudina rosettis (O'Loughlin & Ong, 2015)
- Acaudina spinifera (Teoh & Woo, 2022)
- Acaudina suspecta (Cherbonnier & Féral, 1981)

Many species have been synonymized in the past. For instance, opinions have been divided as to whether A. australis is distinct from A. molpadioides and whether A. hualoeides constitutes a valid species. Conflicting assessments by various authors have led to ongoing taxonomic discussion, however WoRMS currently lists A. Australis and A. hualoeides as valid species.

== Morphology ==
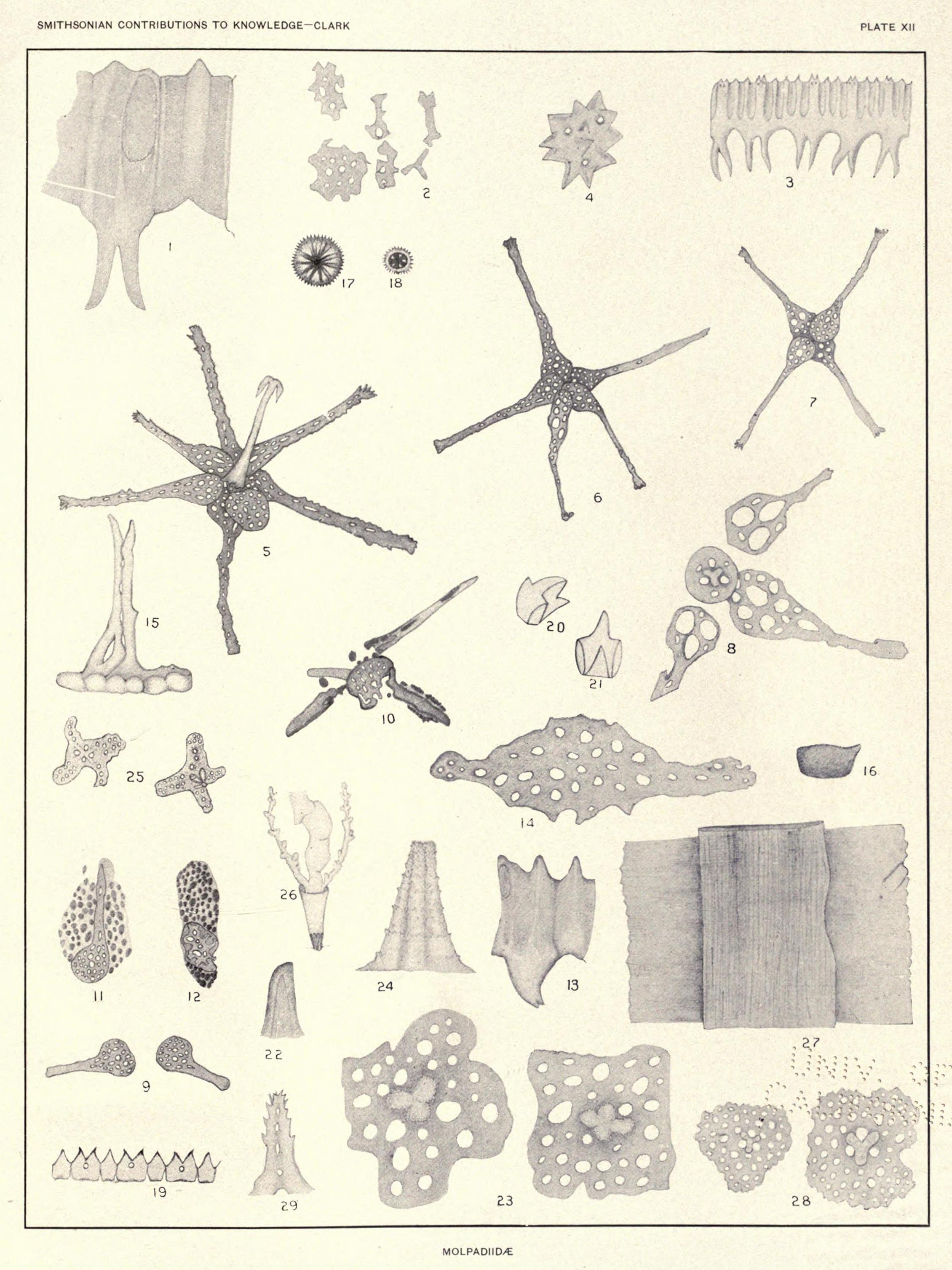
Illustrations showing various morphological features of genus Acaudina, Clark, Hubert Lyman, 1870-1947

Acaudina is characterized by a cylindrical stout body that does not taper toward a caudal region. Unlike Caudina, the posterior end is not distinctly set off as a tail or appendage, but rather blunt and rounded. They range from being of a darker grayish color, to semi-translucent, though some species may contain orange, brown or purple pigment. The lengths vary across species and specimen in the genus. The lengths of observed specimen of Acaudina molpadioides in Java were reported to range from 150-200mm.

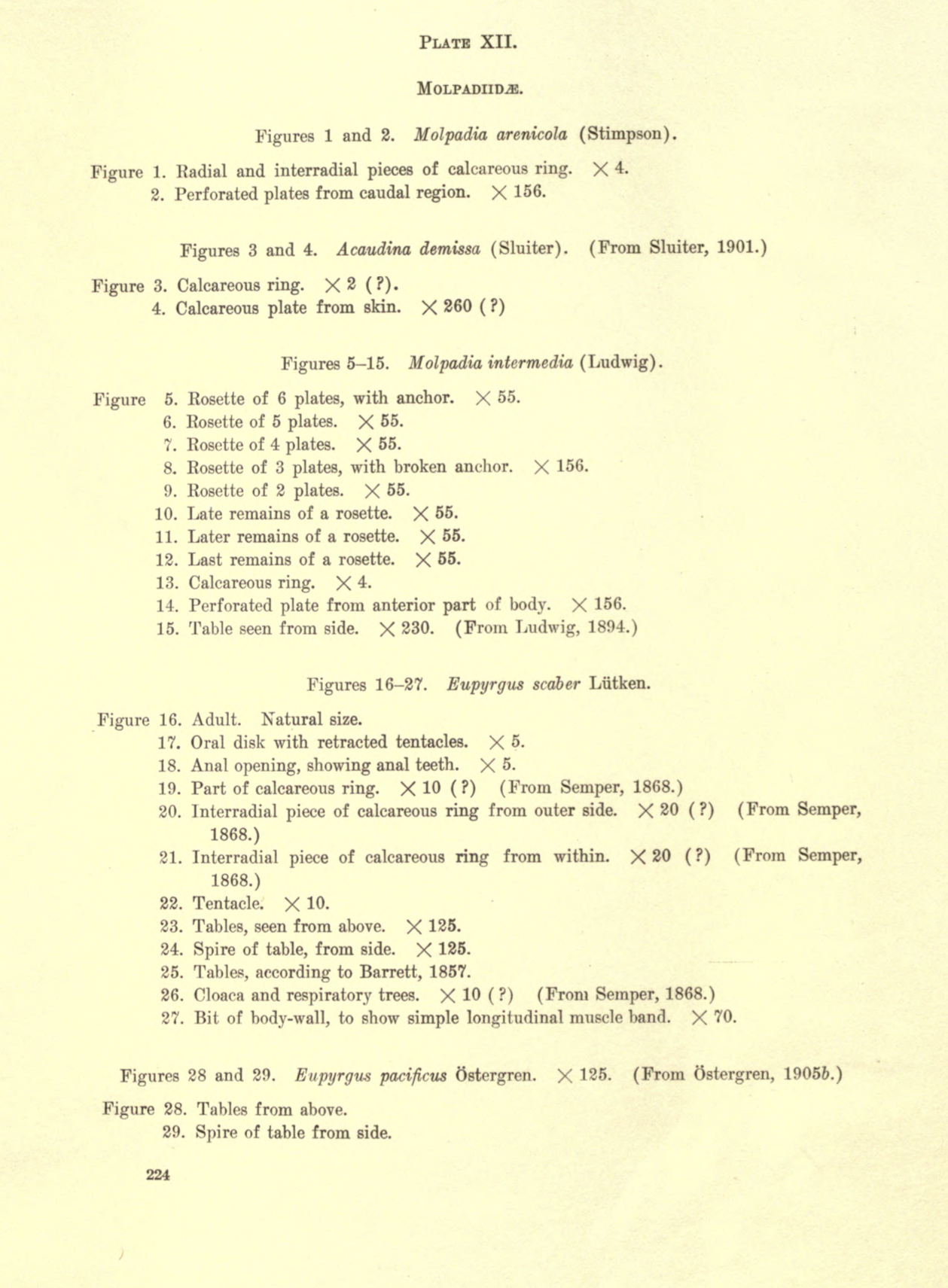
Descriptions for accompanying illustrations showing various morphological features of genus Acaudina, Clark, Hubert Lyman, 1870-1947

Most species possess 15 tentacles, each with a lateral digits pair. The radial pieces of the calcareous rings that are common across the genus show subtle, bifurcated posterior prolongations. Unlike many related genera, these deposits are formed into thick plates, which feature few and small perforations, with a number of sharp projections. Ossicles are present primarily in the posterior body wall and in the fingerlike anal papillae, which come in five sets, of two to four.

=== Genus-level traits ===
The following characteristics can be observed in specimen across species in Acaudina.

Characteristic	Description
Body surface	Smooth, lacking any external appendages
Skin deposits	Calcareous particles arranged in thick plates, each with few sharp projections and small perforations
Calcareous ring	Well-developed, with posterior prolongations
Tentacle count	15
Tentacle morphology	Each bears 2-4 short, blunt digits
Ampullae	Present on the tentacles
Posterior end	Blunt and rounded
Caudal appendage	Absent

=== Species-level traits ===
One report by Teoh and Woo provides an identification key to distinguish the species in the genus.

== Distribution ==
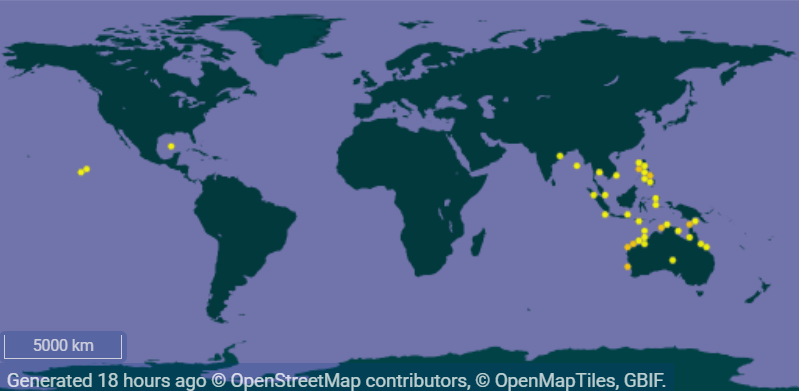
Map showing global distribution of occurrences of Acaudina genus, accessed from Great Biodiversity Informatics Facility website (GBIF)

Acaudina species can be found in the Indo-Pacific littoral region. Some species, (Acaudina leucoprocta, Acaudina molpadioides) found in shallow intertidal zones along the Johor Straits (4), while others (Acaudina bacilla) are found at greater depths of around 168-287m.

The distribution of species across the genus extends to but is not limited by the waters of India, Thailand, Malaysia, Australia, Indonesia, Iran, Singapore, Philippines and China.
