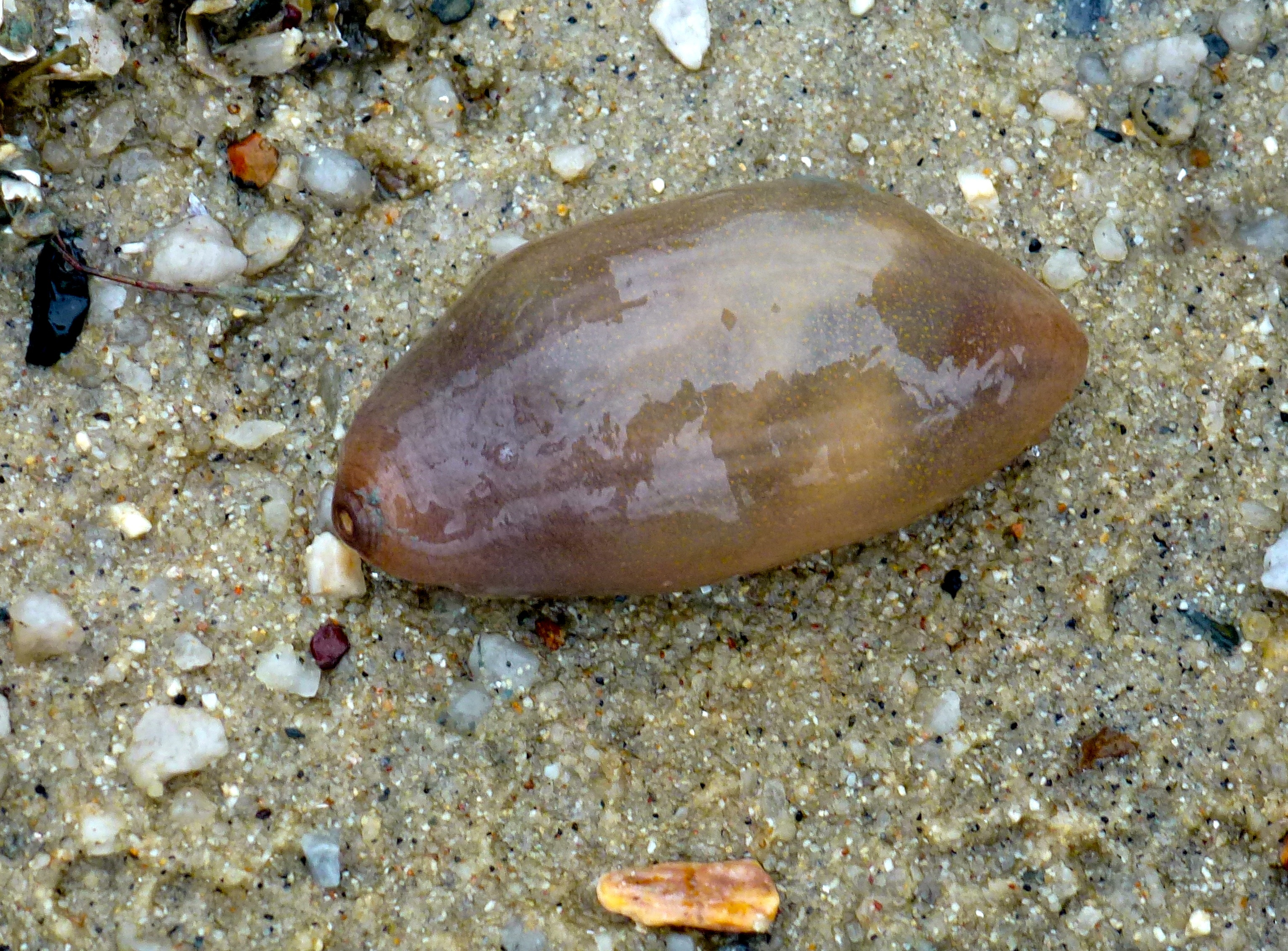

Scientific classification
- Domain: Eukaryota
- Kingdom: Animalia
- Phylum: Echinodermata
- Class: Holothuroidea
- Order: Molpadida
- Family: Caudinidae
- Genus: Acaudina
- Species: A. molpadioides

Binomial name
- Acaudina molpadioides (Semper, 1867)

= Acaudina molpadioides =

Species of sea cucumber

Acaudina molpadioides is a species of sea cucumber in the genus Acaudina. The species is found in the tropical waters of India, Thailand, Malaysia, Indonesia, Philippines and Australia. The cucumber is harvested for use in traditional medicine and as a food. It was first described by Semper in 1867 or 1868.
