= Sea cucumbers as food =

Marine foodstuff

Sea cucumber
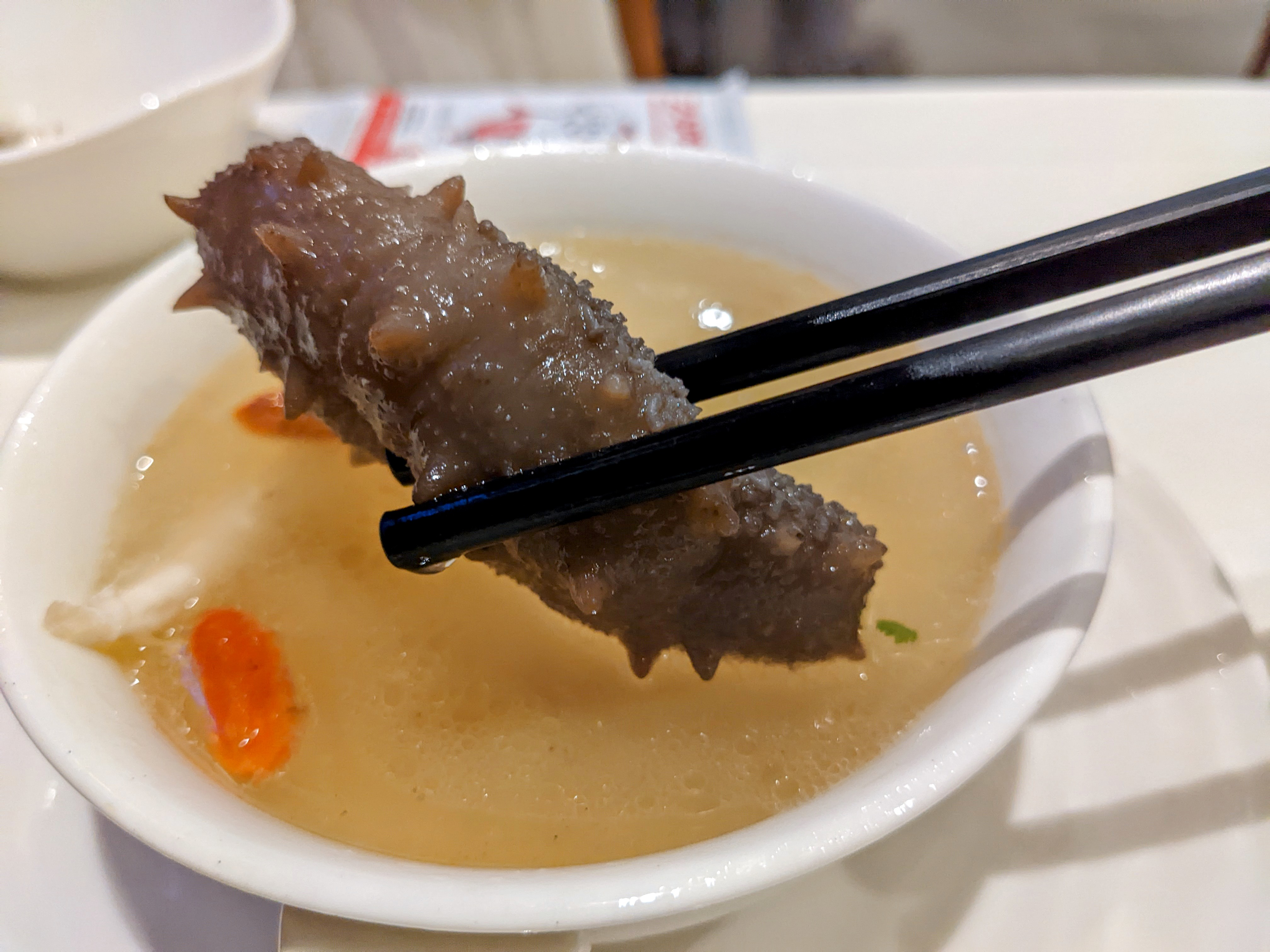

Chinese name
- Traditional Chinese: 海參
- Simplified Chinese: 海参
- Hanyu Pinyin: hǎishēn
- Jyutping: hoi2 sam1
- Literal meaning: sea ginseng
Transcriptions
Standard Mandarin
- Hanyu Pinyin: hǎishēn
Yue: Cantonese
- Jyutping: hoi2 sam1
Southern Min
- Hokkien POJ: hái-sam hái-sim hái-sum

Vietnamese name
- Vietnamese: hải sâm

Korean name
- Hangul: 해삼
- Hanja: 海蔘
Transcriptions
- Revised Romanization: haesam
- McCune–Reischauer: haesam

Sea cucumbers are benthic echinoderms of the class Holothuroidea that are consumed as seafood, in fresh or dried form, in various Asian and Oceanian cuisines. In some cultural contexts, they are thought to have medicinal value.

Sea cucumbers and the food product are commonly known as bêche-de-mer in French, from Portuguese bicho do mar (lit. 'sea animal'), espardenya in Catalan, trepang (or trīpang) in Indonesian, namako in Japanese, balatan in Tagalog, loli in Hawaiian, deniz patlıcanı ('sea aubergine') in Turkish and minch' i mari in Sicilian. In Malay, it is known as the gamat.

Most cultures in East and Southeast Asia regard sea cucumbers as a delicacy; in Chinese cuisine, it is one of the four sea delicacies. Several dishes are made with sea cucumber, and in most dishes, it has a slippery texture. Common ingredients that go with sea cucumber dishes include winter melon, conpoy, kai-lan, shiitake mushroom, and Chinese cabbage. Many sea cucumber species are endangered from overfishing due to the food industry's demand for their consumption.

== Harvest ==
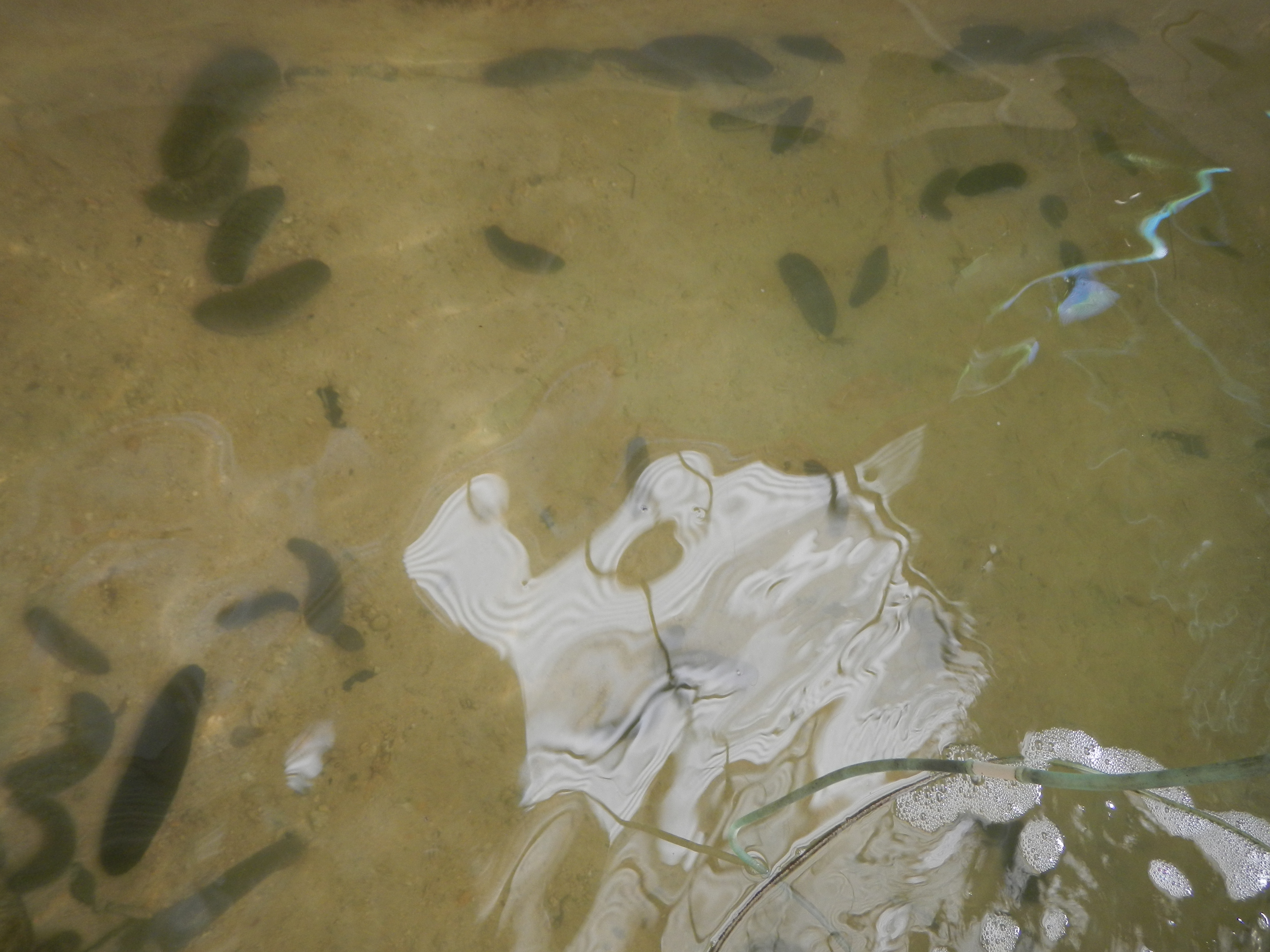
The Philippine balatan or sea cucumber breeding/harvesting

Sea cucumbers destined for food are traditionally harvested by hand from small watercraft, a process called "trepanging" after the Indonesian Malay word for sea cucumber teripang. They are dried for preservation, and must be rehydrated by boiling and soaking in water for several days. They are mainly used as an ingredient in Chinese cuisine soups and stews.

Many commercially important species of sea cucumber are harvested and dried for export for use in Chinese cuisine as 海参 (hǎishēn). Some of the more commonly found species in markets include:

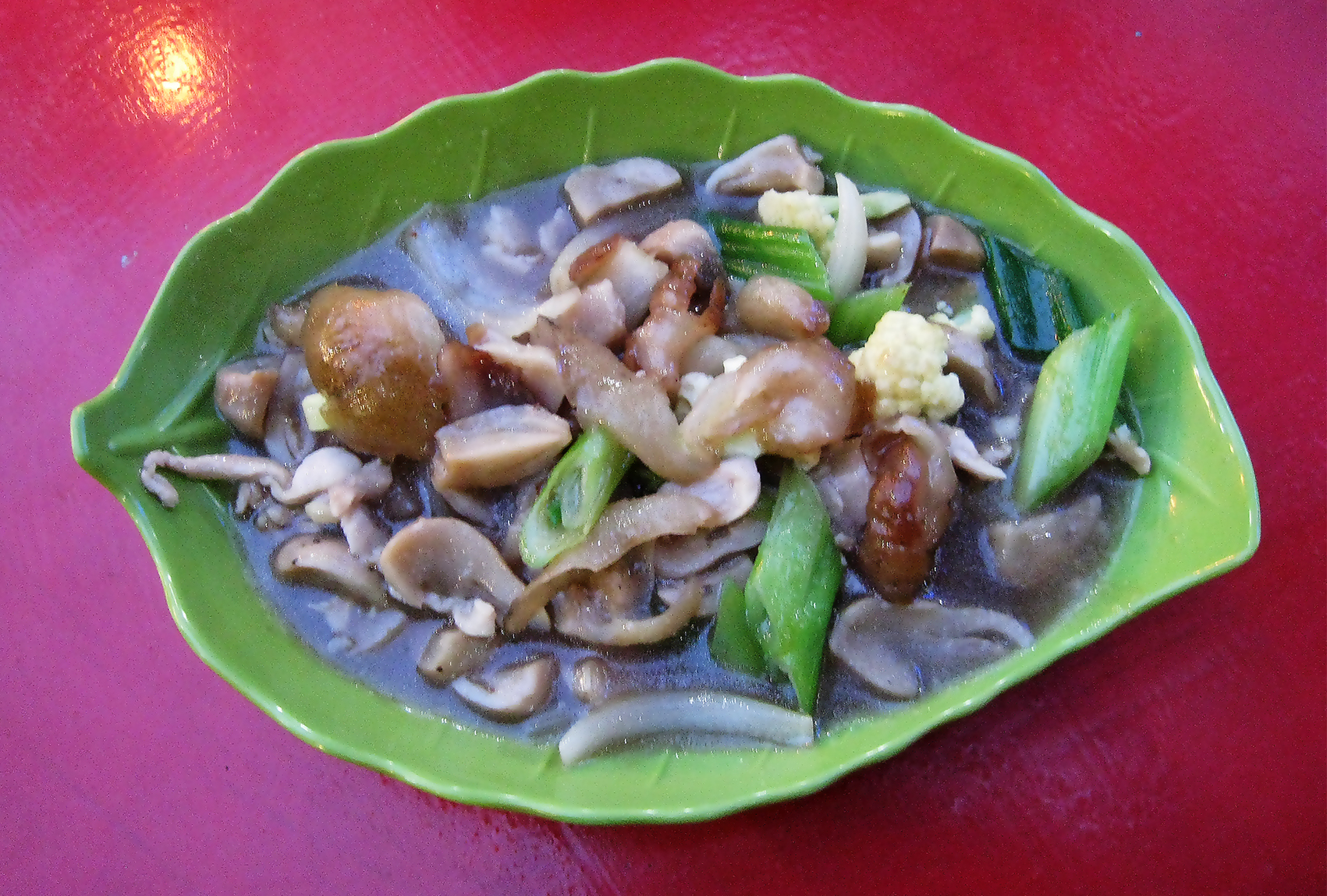
Haisom cah jamur, Chinese Indonesian sea cucumber with mushroom

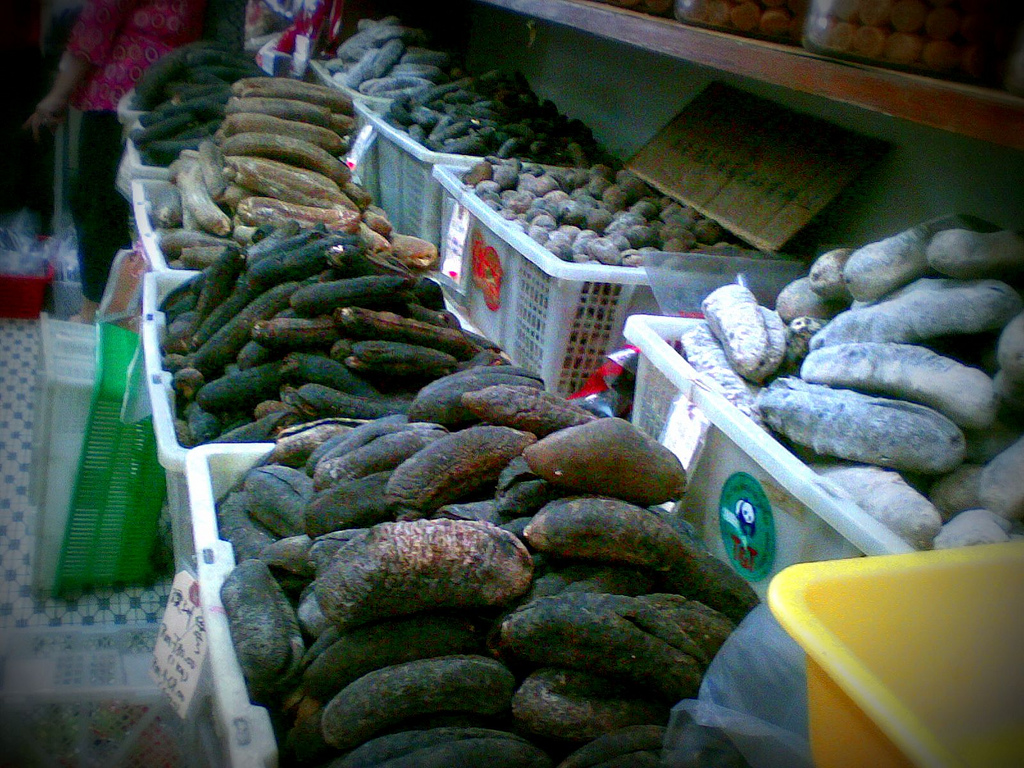
Dried sea cucumbers

- Holothuria edulis (Pinkfish, or common edible sea cucumber, or the pink and black sea cucumber)
- Holothuria scabra (sandfish)
- Holothuria arguinensis
- Holothuria spinifera (brown sandfish)
- Holothuria fuscogilva (bat susu, white teatfish)
- Holothuria nobilis (black teatfish)
- Actinopyga mauritiana (spiny sea cucumber)
- Apostichopus japonicus (Japanese sea cucumber)
- Parastichopus californicus (giant California sea cucumber)
- Parastichopus regalis (royal sea cucumber, or espardenya)
- Thelenota ananas (prickly redfish)
- Acaudina molpadioides

Western Australia has sea cucumber fisheries from Exmouth to the border of the Northern Territory; almost all of the catch is sandfish (Holothuria scabra). The fishing of the various species known as bêche-de-mer is regulated by state and federal legislation.

Five other species are targeted in the state's bêche-de-mer harvest, these are Holothuria nobilis (black teatfish), Holothuria whitmaei (black fish), Thelenota ananas (prickly redfish), Actinopyga echninitis (deep-water redfish), and Holothuria atra (lolly fish).

In the far north of Queensland, Australia, sea cucumber are harvested from the Great Barrier Reef and the Coral Sea. Targeted species include Holothuria noblis (white teatfish), Holothuria whitmaei (black teatfish) and H. scabra (sand fish). Divers are supplied air via hose or "hookah" from the surface and collect their catch by hand, diving to depths of up to 40 m.

== Market ==
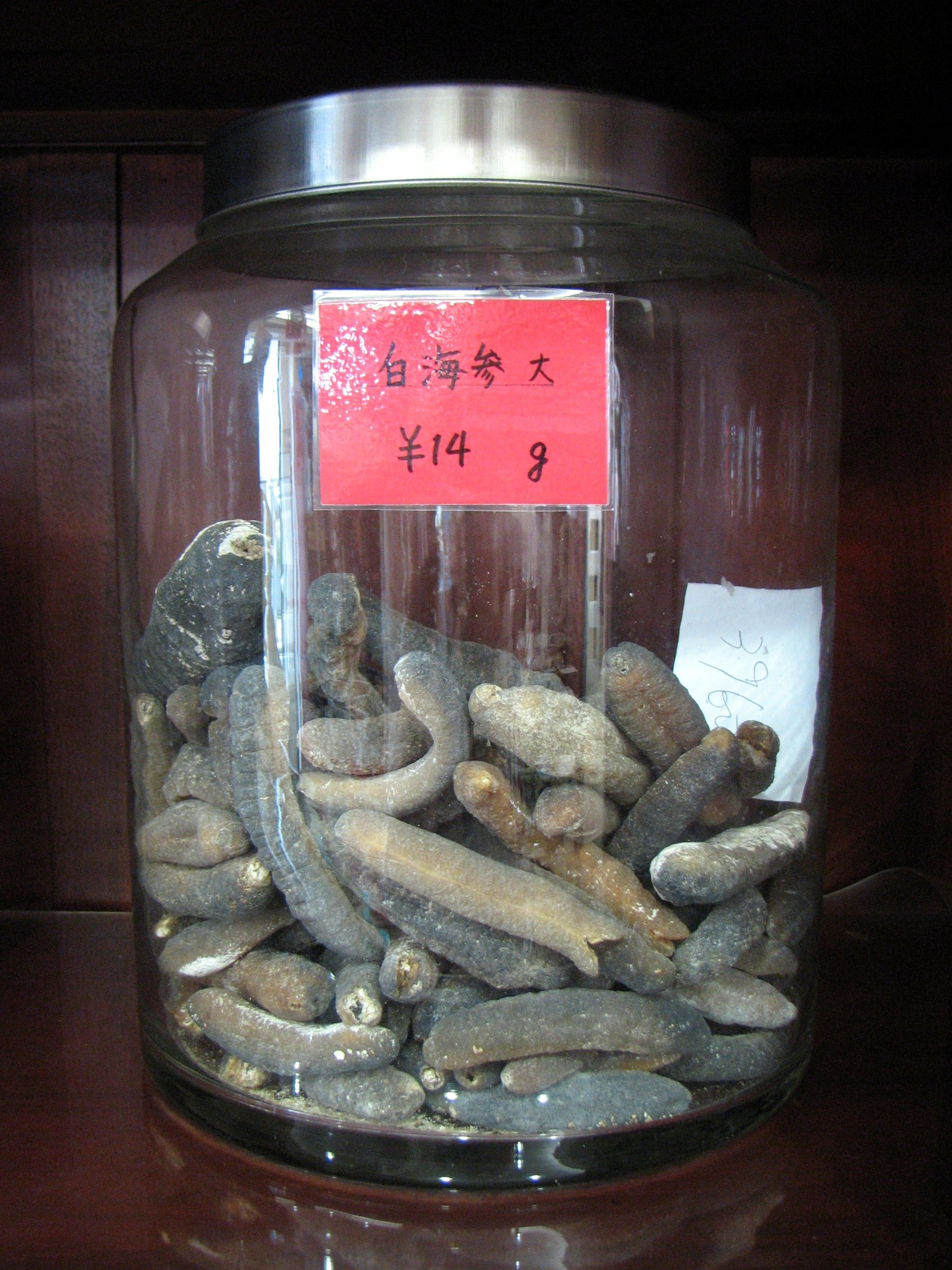
Jar of dried, gutted sea cucumbers at a traditional Chinese medicine emporium in Yokohama, Japan

From the 17th or 18th century CE onwards, traders from Sulawesi established extensive seasonal trade links with the Indigenous peoples of the Kimberley region, the modern-day Northern Territory, and Arnhem Land. They collected trepang (sea cucumber) in particular to supply markets in Southern China.

The Asian market for sea cucumber is estimated to be US$60 million. The dried form accounts for 95% of the sea cucumber traded annually in China, Singapore, Malaysia, Korea, and Japan.

It is typically used in Chinese cuisines. The biggest re-exporters in the trade are Mainland China, Hong Kong, and Singapore. Of the 650 species of sea cucumbers, just 10 species have commercial value. In 2013, the Chinese government cracked down on the purchasing of sea cucumbers by officials as their expensive price tag could be seen as a sign of opulence.

In Japan, sea cucumber is also eaten raw, as sashimi or sunomono, and its intestine is also eaten as konowata, which is salted and fermented food (a variety of shiokara). The dried ovary of sea cucumber is also eaten, which is called konoko (このこ) or kuchiko (くちこ).

It is also considered a delicacy in the northwestern Mediterranean, particularly in Catalan cuisine, often as an ingredient in rice dishes.

Sea cucumbers are considered non-kosher in Jewish dietary law, since they lack scales.

== Culinary use ==
Both a fresh form and a dried form are used for cooking, though its preparation is complex due to its taste being entirely "tasteless and bland". In the Suiyuan shidan, the Chinese Qing Dynasty manual of gastronomy, it is stated: "As an ingredient, sea cucumbers have little to no taste, are full of sand, and are fishy in smell. For these reasons, it is also the most difficult ingredient to prepare well." (海參，無味之物，沙多氣腥，最難討好。) Much of the preparation of sea cucumber goes into cleaning and boiling it, then stewing it in meat broths and extracts to infuse each sea cucumber with flavour.

In Chinese medicine, sea cucumber is considered useful for treating tendonitis and arthritis, along with functioning as an aphrodisiac, among other claims. Gamat has also been traditionally used by Malays for wound healing, painkilling, and the treatment of stomach ulcers. A couple of studies have found that sea cucumber possesses anti-diabetic and antioxidant properties.

Following campaigns encouraging people to avoid shark fin soup, sea cucumber has become an increasingly popular replacement in China.

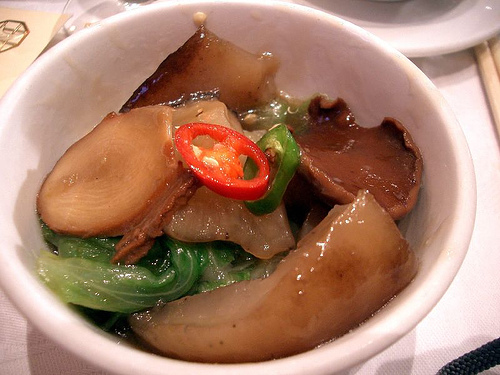
Cooked sea cucumber

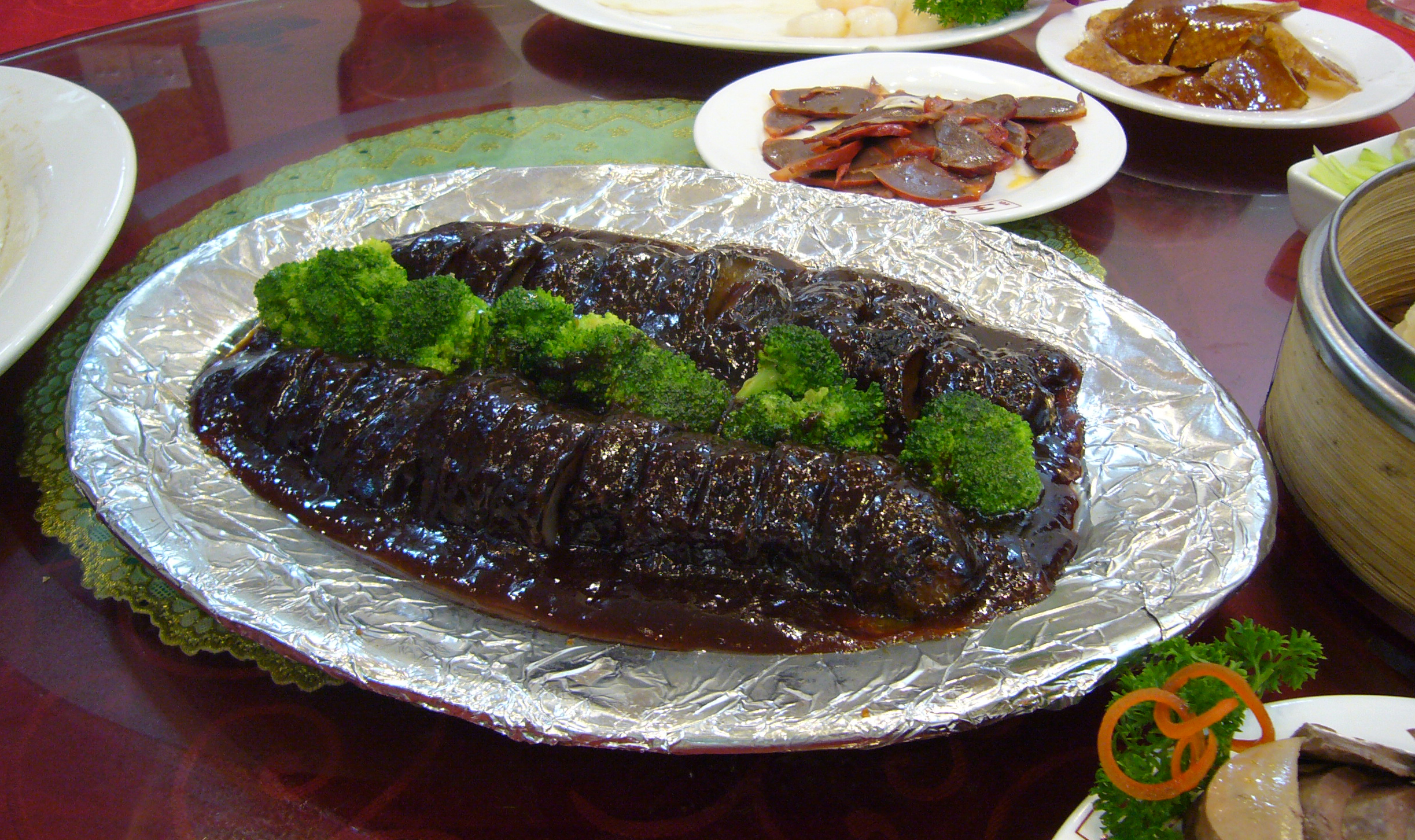
Sea cucumber dish

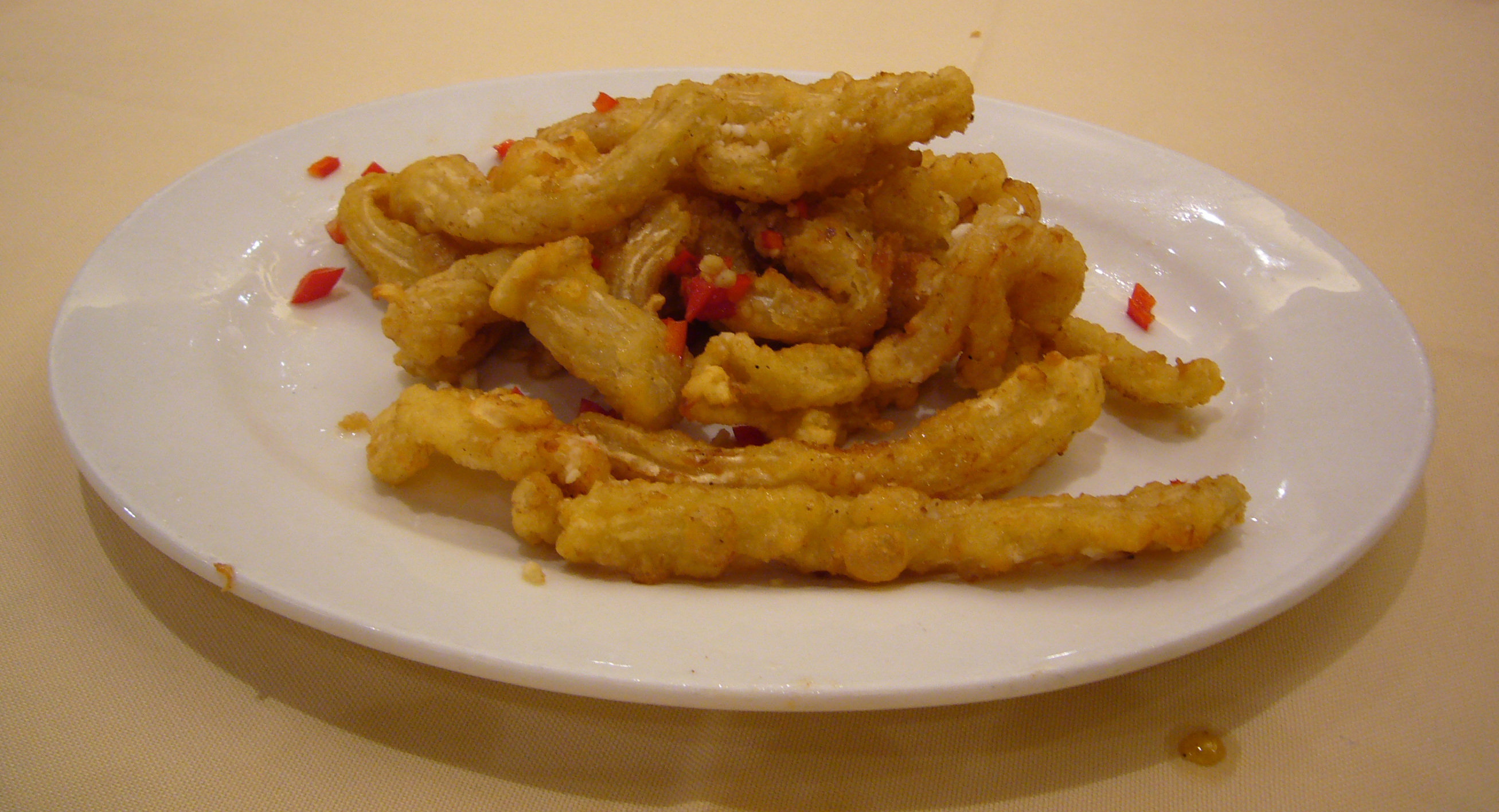
Fried sea cucumber

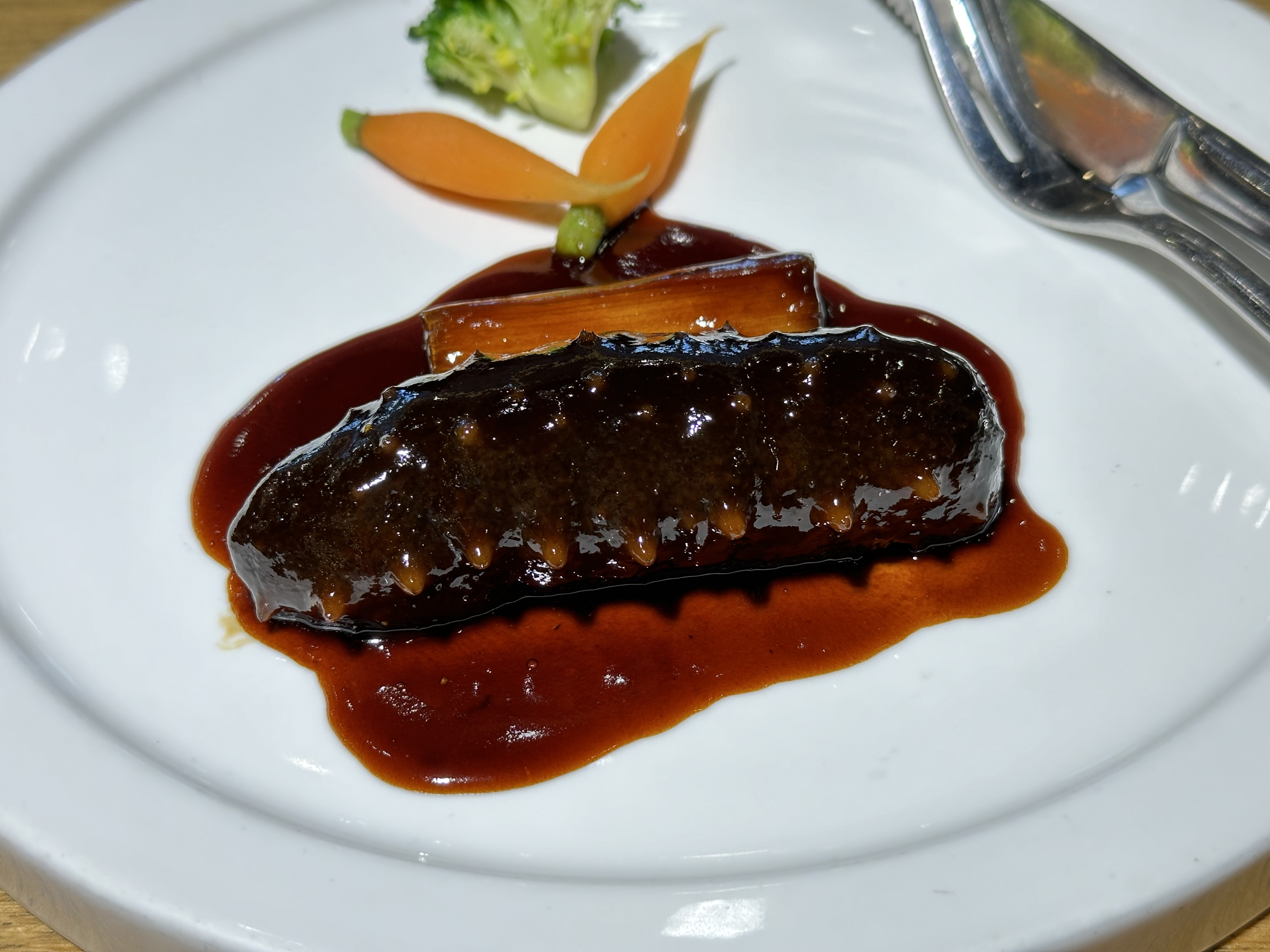
Braised sea cucumber

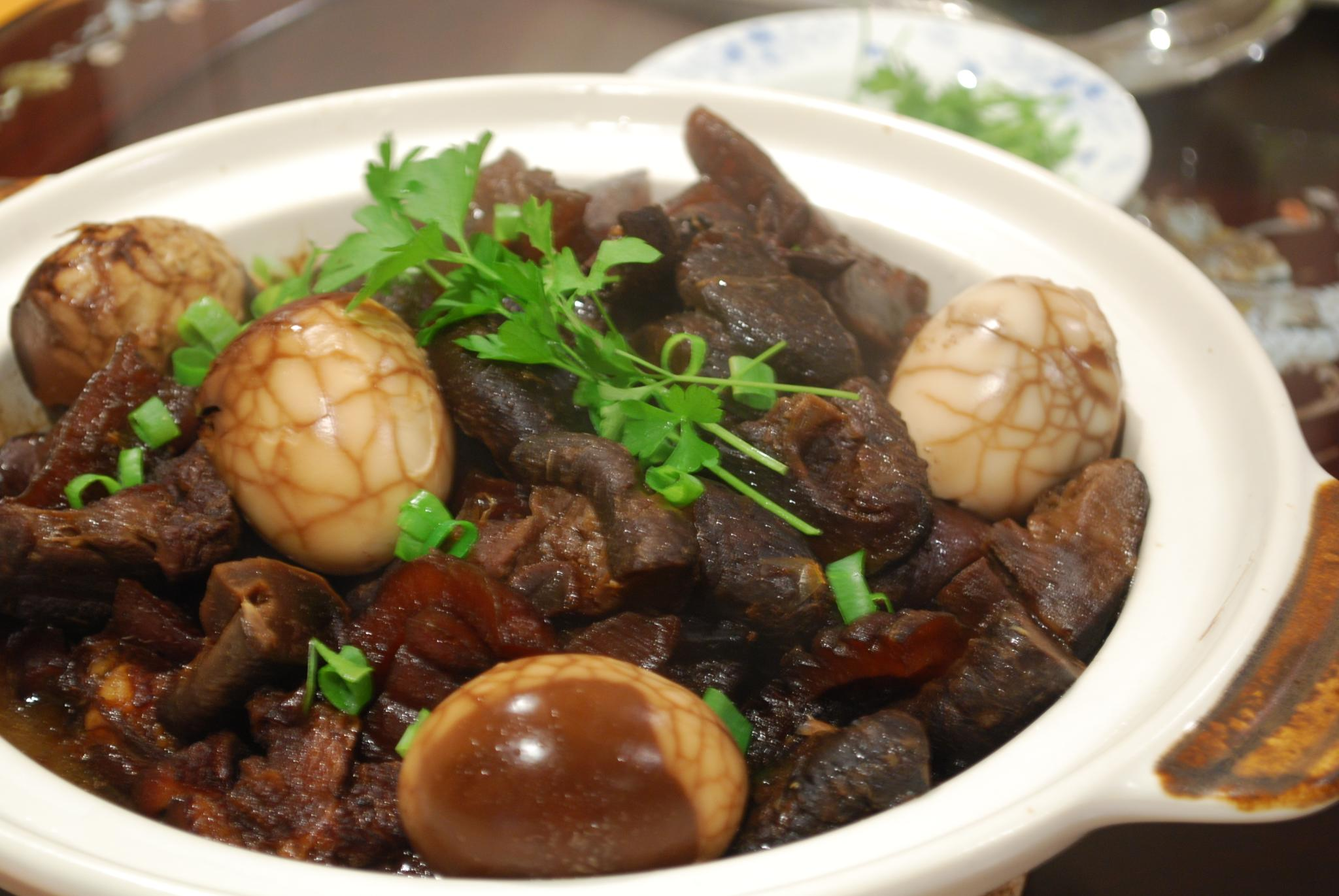
Braised sea cucumber with mushrooms, pork, and tea eggs

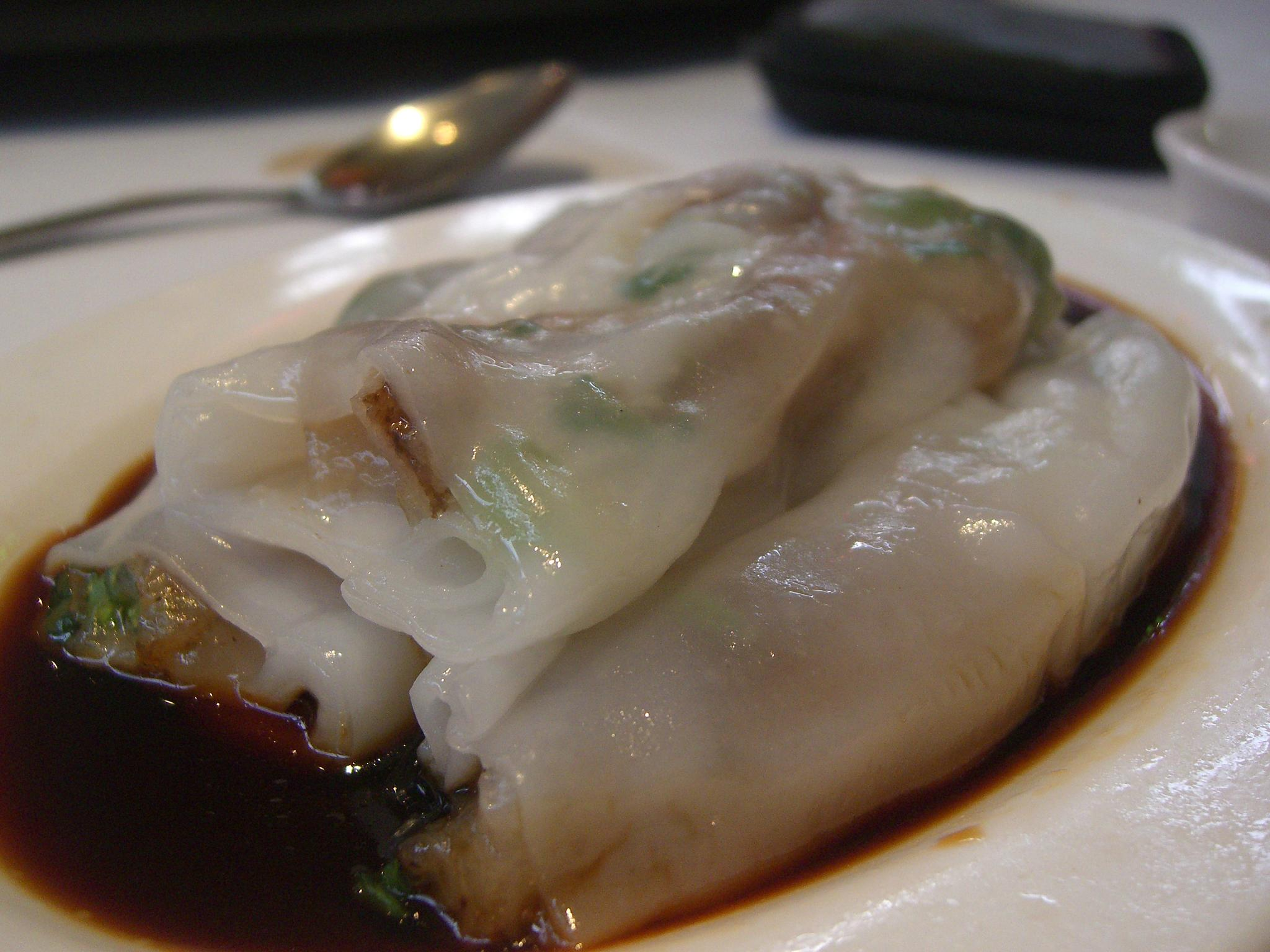
Sea cucumber rice roll

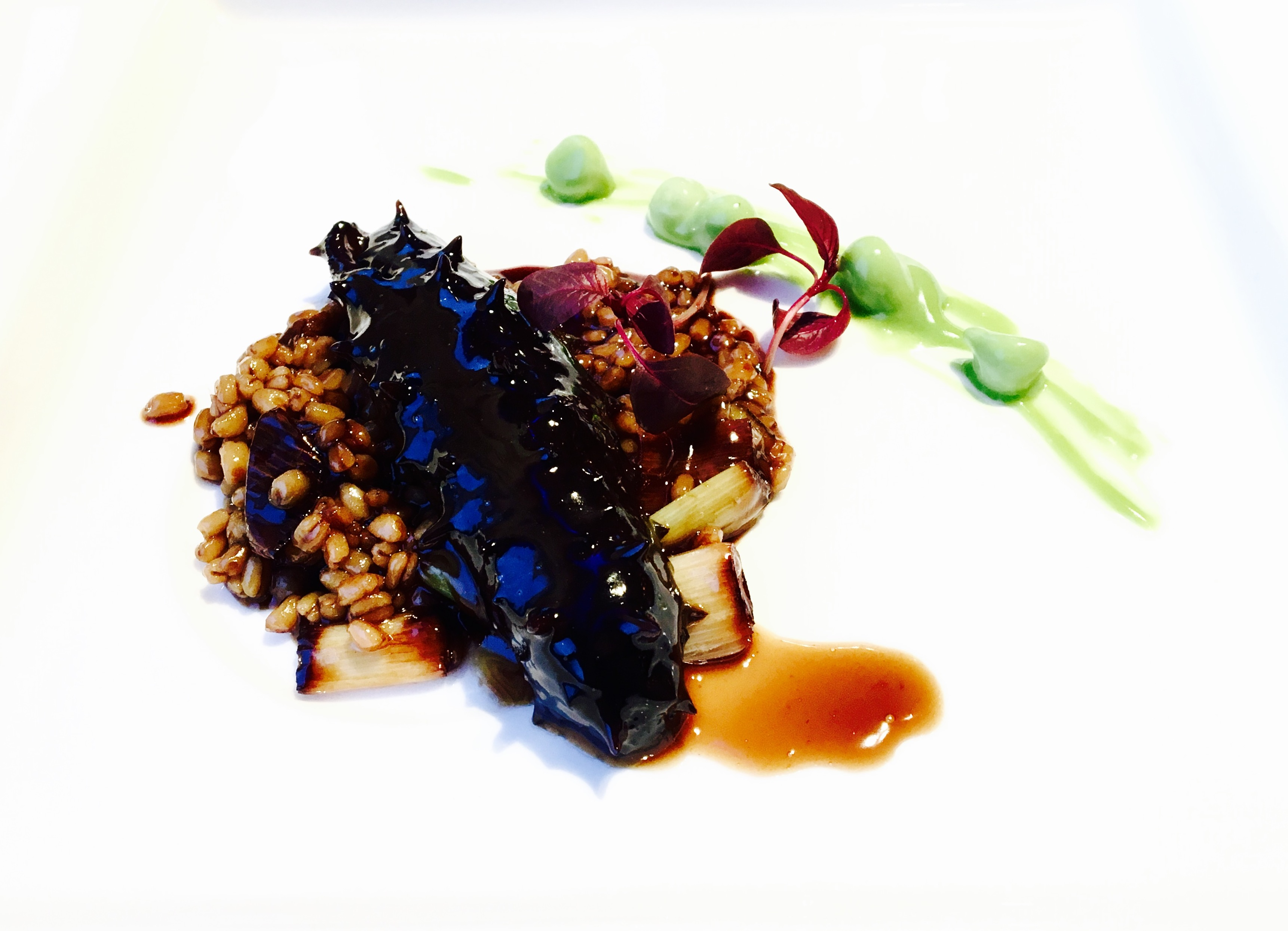
Sea cucumber with scallions, a famous Shandong dish

== See also ==
- Bao yu
- Buddha Jumps Over the Wall
