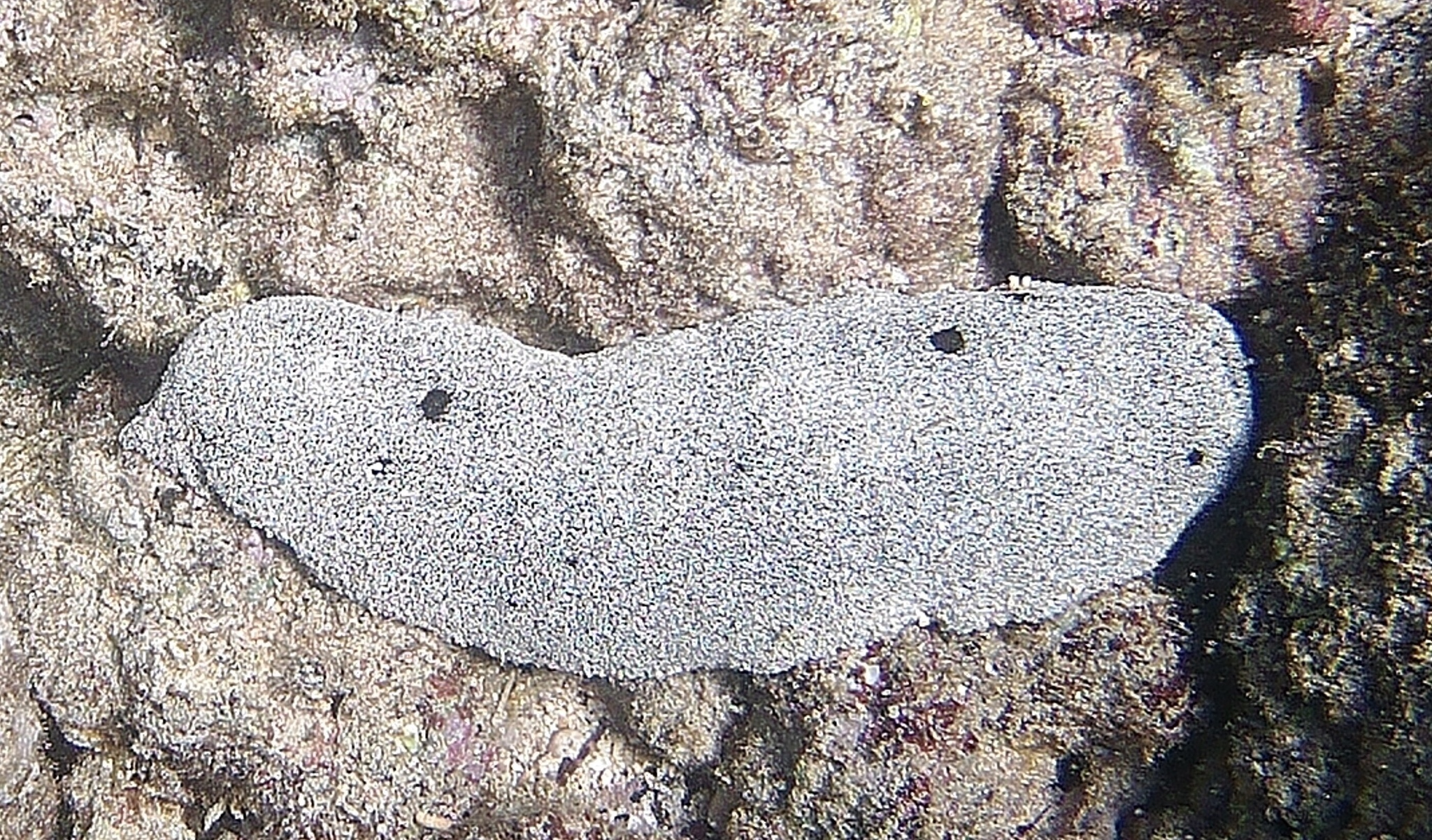

Conservation status
- Endangered (IUCN 3.1)
- CITES Appendix II

Scientific classification
- Kingdom: Animalia
- Phylum: Echinodermata
- Class: Holothuroidea
- Order: Holothuriida
- Family: Holothuriidae
- Genus: Holothuria
- Species: H. whitmaei

Binomial name
- Holothuria whitmaei Bell, 1887

Synonyms
- Holothuria mammifera Saville-Kent, 1890; Mülleria maculata (Brandt)

= Holothuria whitmaei =

Species of sea cucumber

Holothuria (Microthele) whitmaei, commonly known as the black teatfish, is a species of sea cucumber in the family Holothuriidae. The sea cucumber is distributed in the western Indian and Pacific oceans, with specimens being found off of Tanzania, New Caledonia and the Philippines. They are usually found in groups of 5-25 individuals.

== Description ==
H. whitmaei is now classified as a separate species from H. nobilis. H. whitmaei used to be included in H. nobilis.

Seasonal trends from two populations of H. whitmaei were investigated, between the Great Barrier Reef and Ningaloo Reef. The gonad index was found to peak between April and June. Macroscopic and histological analysis revealed “that large germinal tubules, positioned centrally on the gonad basis, progressed through four maturity stages: growing (II); mature (III); partly spawned (IV); and spent (V)”.

In one study in 2003, they were unsure why “up to 23% of H. whitmaei specimens were hidden from some time during the night until midday". Although in another study to obtain ecological data on H. whitmaei, “rates of activity in marked specimens increased significantly in the initial hours after marking”. This suggests that marking the specimens likely compromises the research.

“Diurnal studies of 30 black teat fish on the Ningaloo Reef...found that the proportion of animals sheltered (and therefore hidden when viewed from directly above) was significantly greater in the morning...relative to the afternoon”. A different study found that (on marked and unmarked specimens) they were most active between the hours of 2:30-5:30pm.

== Use and conservation ==
Many sea cucumbers are processed, dried, and boiled to become beche-de-mar. It is a very important and profitable commodity in many Pacific countries and communities, particularly in Papua New Guinea, the Solomon Islands, Australia, and the Fiji Islands. H. whitmaei are "among the highest value species and well-dried ‘A’ grade product may command a price of $US 70–190 per kg depending on size and quality". Although a moratorium due to overproduction has prevented supply from Papua New Guinea since 2009. Fiji on the other hand exports 243 tons of sea cucumber food per year.
