= Caudina =

- Caudina arenicola

Scientific classification
- Kingdom: Animalia
- Phylum: Echinodermata
- Class: Holothuroidea
- Order: Molpadida
- Family: Caudinidae
- Genus: Caudina; Stimpson, 1853

Genus of sea cucumbers

Caudina is a genus of sea cucumbers of the family Caudinidae described by William Stimpson in 1853.

Accepted species of this genus include;

- Caudina arenata (Gould, 1841)
- Caudina arenicola (Stimpson, 1857)
- Caudina atacta Pawson & Liao, 1992
