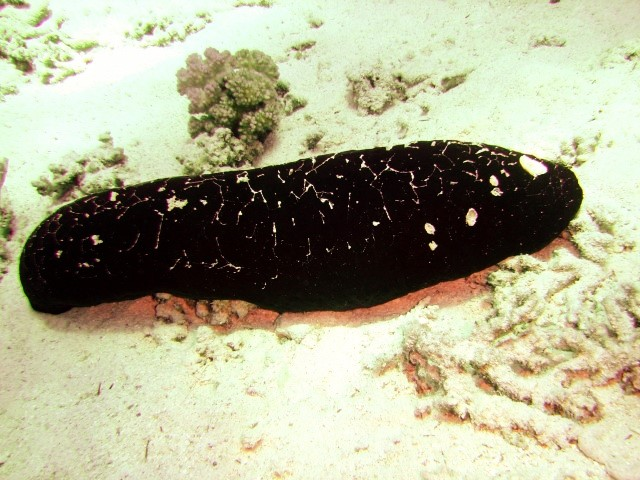

Conservation status
- Critically Endangered (IUCN 3.1)
- CITES Appendix II

Scientific classification
- Kingdom: Animalia
- Phylum: Echinodermata
- Class: Holothuroidea
- Order: Holothuriida
- Family: Holothuriidae
- Genus: Holothuria
- Species: H. nobilis

Binomial name
- Holothuria nobilis (Selenka, 1867)

Synonyms
- Microthele nobilis (Selenka, 1867); Mülleria nobilis Selenka, 1867

= Holothuria nobilis =

Species of sea cucumber

Holothuria (Microthele) nobilis, the black teatfish, is a species of sea cucumber in the genus Holothuria. The sea cucumber is found in the tropical waters of the Indo-Pacific ocean. It was first described by Emil Selenka in 1867.

== Description ==
The cucumber inhabits shallow waters near islands and reefs. Members of the species are blackish-brown and grey in colour, and mature adults can weight between 1.7 and 4 kilograms.

== Use as food ==
Like the related white teatfish, the black teatfish is part of a commercial fishery across its range and the cucumber is regularly consumed as a food. The species can be collected off the seafloor using diving suits or while skindiving, making the species very vulnerable to overfishing. The species is considered critically endangered.
