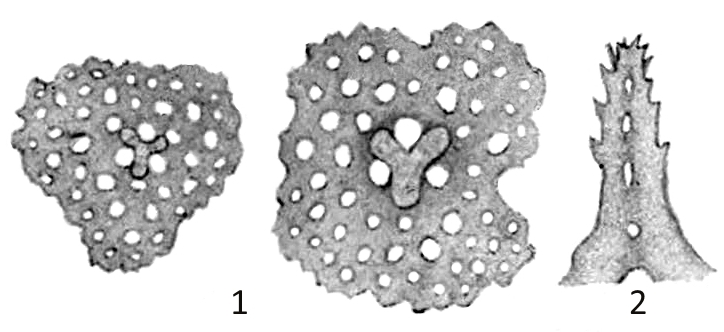
- Eupyrgus pacificus: 1. Tables from above, 2. Spire of table from side

Scientific classification
- Kingdom: Animalia
- Phylum: Echinodermata
- Class: Holothuroidea
- Order: Molpadida
- Family: Eupyrgidae; Semper, 1867
- Genus: Eupyrgus; Lütken, 1857

Synonyms
- Echinosoma Semper, 1867

= Eupyrgus =

Genus of sea cucumbers

Eupyrgus is a genus of sea cucumbers. It is the only genus in the monotypic family Eupyrgidae.

Description: The body wall tables with a high and spiny spire are placed near the disc's edge. There are three pillars connected by crossbeams ending in a tooth.

Location: Eupyrgus can be found in Campos Basin, Brazil. They were found at a depth of 500m.

== Species ==
There are two species recognised in the genus Eupyrgus:

- Eupyrgus pacificus Östergren, 1905
- Eupyrgus scaber Lütken, 1857
