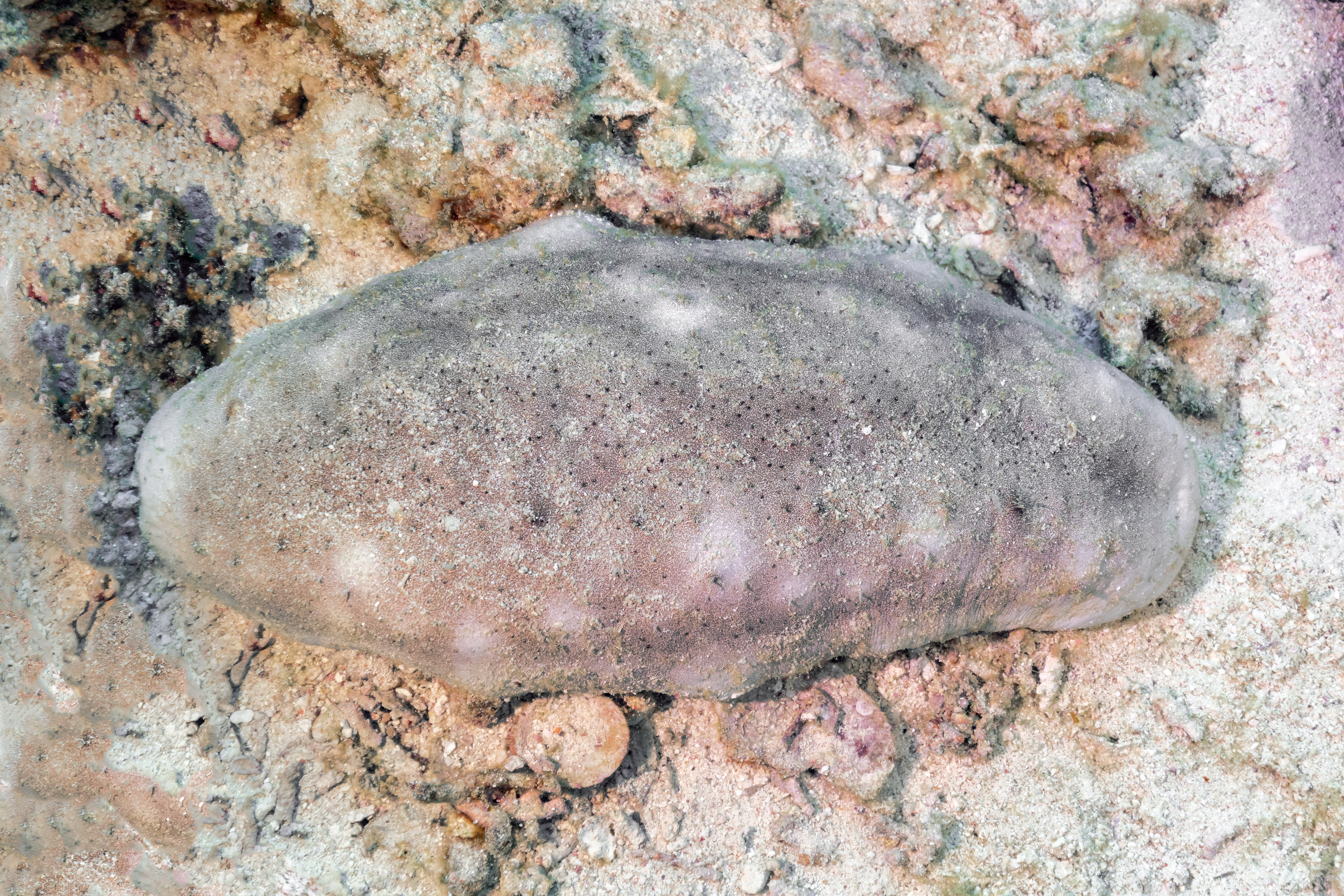
- H. fuscogilva in the Red Sea

Conservation status
- Endangered (IUCN 3.1)
- CITES Appendix II

Scientific classification
- Kingdom: Animalia
- Phylum: Echinodermata
- Class: Holothuroidea
- Order: Holothuriida
- Family: Holothuriidae
- Genus: Holothuria
- Species: H. fuscogilva

Binomial name
- Holothuria fuscogilva Cherbonnier, 1980

= Holothuria fuscogilva =

Species of sea cucumber

Holothuria (Microthele) fuscogilva, also known as the white teatfish or white teeth, is a species of sea cucumber in the genus Holothuria, subgenus Microthele. The cucumber is found in the tropical waters of the Indo-Pacific ocean. The species is vulnerable to over-exploitation from commercial fishing. It was first formally named by Gustave Cherbonnier in 1980.

== Distribution and habitat ==
Holothuria fuscogilva are found in the Indo-Pacific ocean in shallow waters near islands and around coral reefs. Juvenile cucumbers live in shallower waters (such as inter-tidal zones) and then migrate to deeper waters as they mature. Spawning occurs during the Northeastern Monsoon season (October to December), and the species reaches sexual maturity relatively late.

== Description ==
Adult cucumbers weigh between 2.4 and 4 kilograms (5.3 and 8.8 lb). They are oval in shape and have a firm texture. This species cucumber has lateral papillae (teats) which are often buried in the sand.

== Use ==
Holothuria fuscogilva is consumed as a food and is of large commercial value across its range. The cucumber can be collected by hand using a diving suit or while skin diving, allowing for it to be easily harvested.

== Vulnerability and conservation ==
Due to overfishing, the cucumber was listed as endangered on the IUCN Red List in 2026.

A large population of the cucumber formerly existed in Sri Lanka, but decades of overfishing and mismanagement caused a large decline in the species' numbers. Sri Lanka banned the harvesting of the species in 2019.
