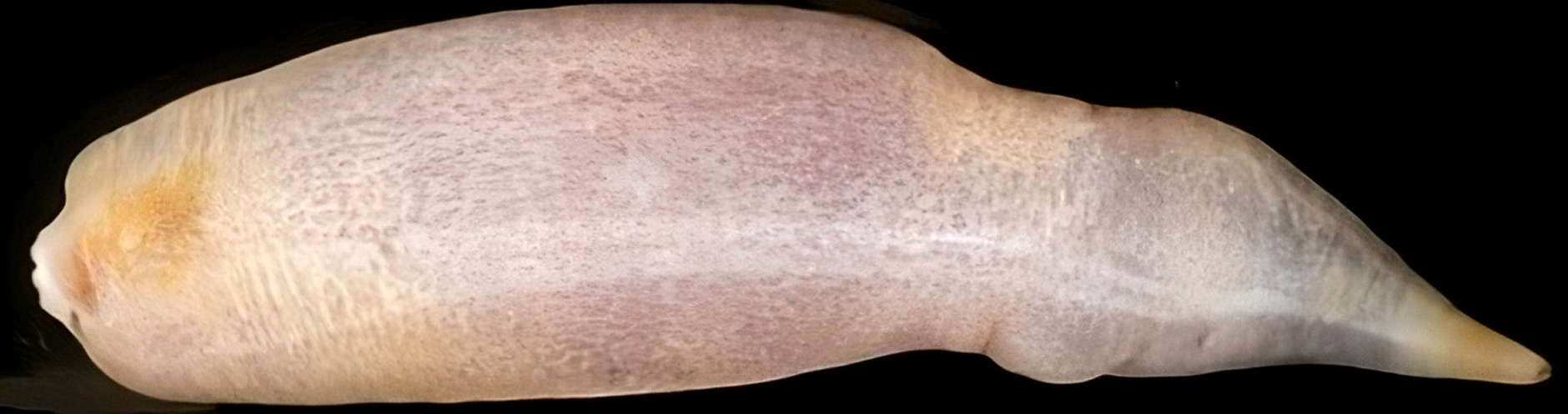
- Molpadia amorpha

Scientific classification
- Kingdom: Animalia
- Phylum: Echinodermata
- Class: Holothuroidea
- Order: Molpadida
- Family: Molpadiidae; Müller, 1850

Genera
- See text

Synonyms
- Trochostomidae Östergren, 1907

= Molpadiidae =

Family of echinoderms

Molpadiidae is a family of sea cucumbers, marine invertebrates with elongated bodies, leathery skins and tentacles that are found on or burrowing in the sea floor.

== Description ==
Members of Molpadiidae are fairly small, plump sea cucumbers with a smooth or slimy skin and no tube feet. They are relatively inactive and live in a U-shaped burrow in sand or mud at the bottom of the sea, often at considerable depths. Their tentacles spread out above the sediment to catch food particles.

== Genera ==
The following genera are accepted as being in the family Molpadiidae:

- Cherbonniera Sibuet, 1974
- Heteromolpadia Pawson, 1963
- Molpadia Cuvier, 1817
