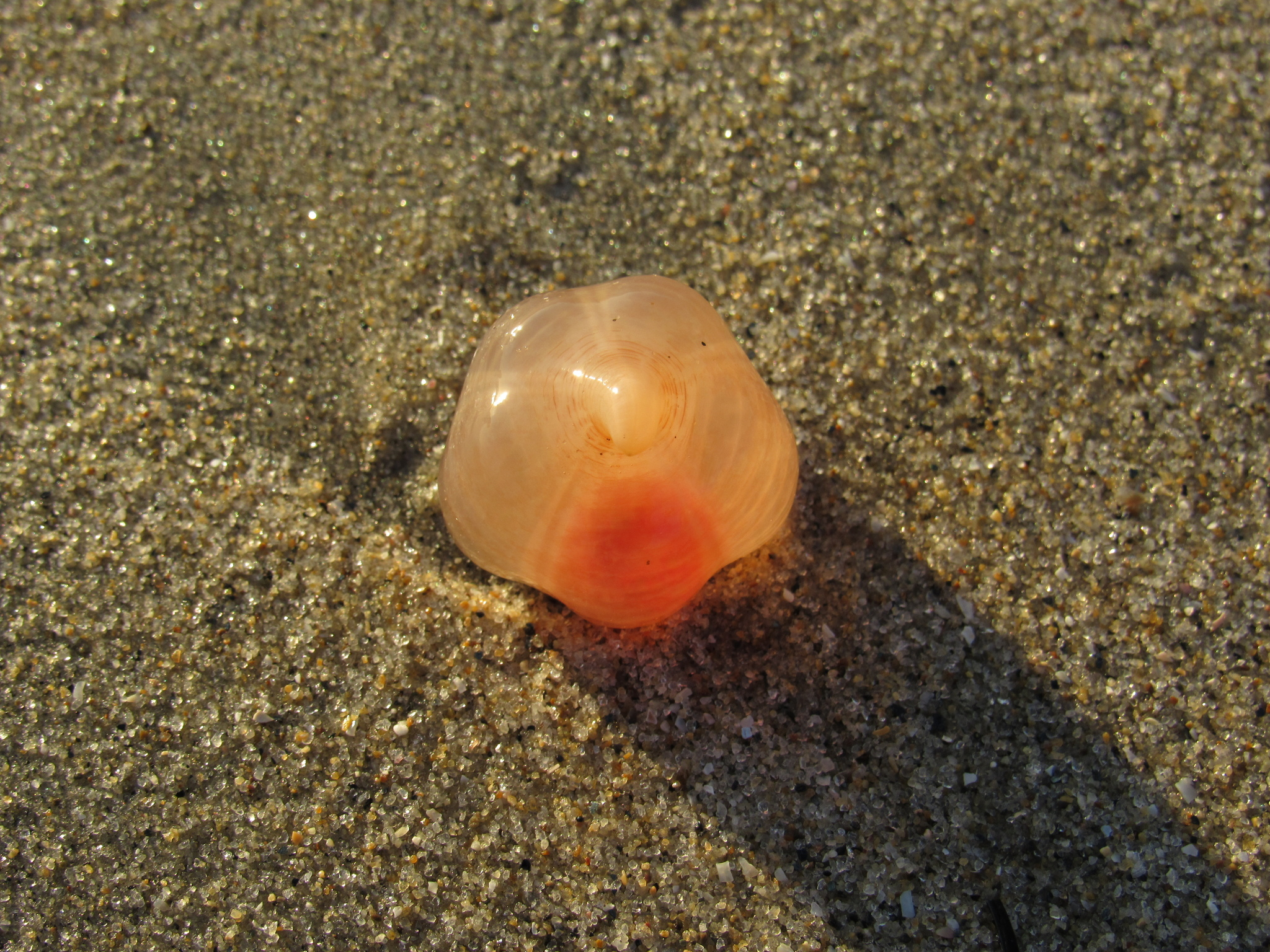
- An immature Caudina arenicola washed up at San Diego

Scientific classification
- Kingdom: Animalia
- Phylum: Echinodermata
- Class: Holothuroidea
- Order: Molpadida
- Family: Caudinidae; Perrier, 1902

Genera
- See text

= Caudinidae =

Family of echinoderms

Caudinidae is a family of sea cucumbers, marine animals with elongated bodies, leathery skins and tentacles that are found on the sea floor.

== Description ==
Members of the family Caudinidae are fairly small, plump sea cucumbers with a thin body wall and no tube feet. They are relatively inactive and live in a U-shaped burrow in sand or mud at the bottom of the sea. Their tentacles spread out above the sediment to catch food particles and their caudal region may be elongated and also extend to the surface. This may help with gas exchange as they have respiratory trees, a type of water lung, attached to the cloaca.

== Genera ==
The following genera are accepted in the family Caudinidae:

- Acaudina Clark, 1907
- Caudina Stimpson, 1853
- Ceraplectana H.L. Clark, 1908
- Hedingia Deichmann, 1938
- Paracaudina Heding, 1931
