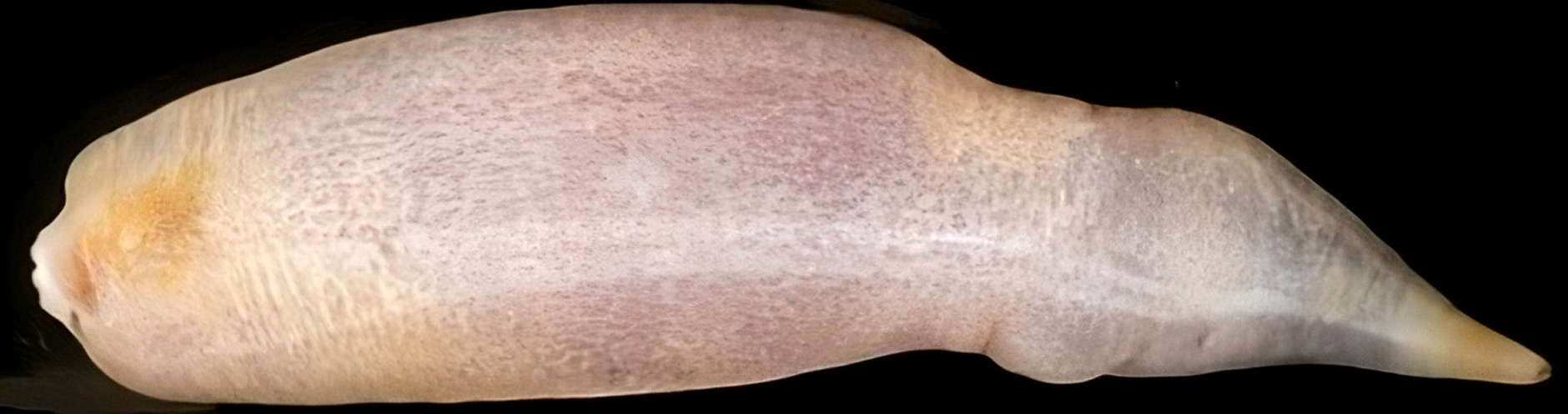
- Molpadia amorpha

Scientific classification
- Domain: Eukaryota
- Kingdom: Animalia
- Phylum: Echinodermata
- Class: Holothuroidea
- Subclass: Actinopoda
- Order: Molpadida; Haeckel, 1896

Families
- Caudinidae Heding, 1931; Eupyrgidae Semper, 1867; Molpadiidae J. Müller, 1850; Molpadida incertae sedis

= Molpadida =

Order of sea cucumbers

Molpadida is an order of sea cucumbers. The body shape is fusiform and unlike other sea cucumbers, their hind body is narrowed to form a distinct tail. Although they possess tentacles around the mouth derived from the water vascular system, they have no true tube feet, and are therefore believed to be related to the Apodida.

They have fifteen much branched tentacles and a stout body. They have tentacle ampullae and respiratory trees present, a kind of water lung attached to the cloaca. The ossicles, minute calcareous plates embedded in the skin and characteristic of each species, take the form of tables, anchors, fusiform rods and perforated plates but never wheels.

Like their relatives, they are adapted for burrowing into soft sediment, but they are relatively sedentary, rarely moving once they have excavated their burrow. Their burrow is U-shaped, with the animal's tentacles projecting from one end.
