= Sony Pictures Television Kids =

Television production and brand licensing company

Silvergate Media Limited
- Logo used since 2022
- Trade name: Sony Pictures Television – Kids
- Type: Division
- Industry: Entertainment
- Genre: Children's programmes
- Predecessors: Chorion; Adelaide Productions
- Founded: September 8, 2011; 15 years ago
- Founders: Waheed Alli; William Astor
- Headquarters: New York City, New York; Sony Pictures Studios, Culver City, California, U.S. London, England
- Key people: Joe D'Ambrosia (EVP & general manager); Kurt Mueller (EVP)
- Production output: Television production
- Brands: Hilda; Beatrix Potter
- Services: Licensing
- Parent: Shamrock Capital Advisors (2016–2019); Sony Pictures Television (2019–present)
- Website: www.sonypicturestelevision-kids.com

Silvergate Media Limited, trading as Sony Pictures Television – Kids, is a British-American television production and brand licensing company based in New York City and London founded in 2011 by Waheed Alli and William Astor. It is a division of Sony Pictures Television that owns and develops children's programmes and intellectual property.

== History ==
Silvergate Media was created in 2011 as part of a management buyout, when Alli purchased the rights to Octonauts and The World of Beatrix Potter from Chorion, a company he was previously chair of.

In 2013, Silvergate launched its television distribution arm. In 2016, Netflix and Silvergate agreed to a three-year multi-territory deal for Octonauts, Silvergate's series about underwater explorers.

The company signed a deal with Netflix, in collaboration with Mercury Filmworks to produce Hilda, an animated television adaptation of comic Hilda by Luke Pearson. Season 1 was released on September 21, 2018. Season 2 was released on December 14, 2020. The series is available in 130 countries.

Silvergate also produced Sunny Day for Nickelodeon, which started airing on August 21, 2017.

In 2016, the investment fund Shamrock Capital Advisors acquired a 51% equity of the company, with the valuation reported to be "between £70 and £80 million".

Silvergate Media logo, used from 2011 to 2022

On December 10, 2019, Sony Pictures Television announced that it would acquire Silvergate Media for US$195 million. The deal marks SPT's first in-house studio devoted primarily to children's animation since Sony Pictures Animation's diversification into television.

In February 2022, former Disney Jr. Senior Vice President of original programming and Sony Pictures Family Entertainment Group executive Joe D'Ambrosia was named Executive Vice President and General Manager of Silvergate Media, succeeding co-founder Waheed Alli, who stepped down as CEO the following summer.

In November 2022, Silvergate Media's trading name was changed to Sony Pictures Television – Kids, although the company name was not changed.

In December 2023, the company's valuation was reduced to US$50 million in impairment charges. In addition, co-founder William Astor stepped down as chairman at the end of the month.

On September 19, 2024, the studio relaunched their "Octonauts & Friends" content hub channel as Kidzuko, which offers content from other Sony-owned properties in addition to properties already held by SPTK as well as entirely new exclusive content.

In March 2026, two years after Sony Pictures Television Kids sued Wanda Studios, the Chinese entertainment arm of Wanda Group over the Octonauts franchise under a long-running lawsuit back in November 2024, Sony Pictures Television Kids announced it had settled the lawsuit by selling its Octonauts franchise along with the 49% stake in its parent holding company of the series Vampire Squid Productions to Chinese entertainment & education arm of Wanda Media, Wanda Studios, giving the Chinese entertainment arm full ownership of the British holding company Vampire Squid Productions as well as giving full ownership of the Octonauts franchise.

== Filmography ==
=== Television series ===
Title	Creator(s) / Developer(s)	Seasons	First aired	Last aired	Network / Platform	Co-production with	Notes
Octonauts	—N/a	5	2012	present	CBeebies	Brown Bag Films (2012–18); Mainframe Studios (2020–present)	Season 2 onward; continued from Chorion; Rights held by Wanda Studios
Peter Rabbit	Cathal Gaffney	2	2012	2016	CBeebies (United Kingdom); Nickelodeon (United States)	Brown Bag Films; Penguin Books	Rights held by Paramount Global Content Distribution in North America and India
Sunny Day	Paula Rosenthal; Sarah Blondine Mullervy	2	2017	2020	Nickelodeon (2017–18); Nick Jr. (2018–19); Amazon Prime Video (2020)	Pipeline Studios; Nickelodeon Animation Studio	Rights held by Paramount Global Content Distribution
Hilda	Luke Pearson; Stephanie Simpson; Kurt Mueller	3	2018	2023	Netflix	Atomic Cartoons (2018); Mercury Filmworks; Nobrow Press (2018); Flying Eye Books (2020–23)	
Chico Bon Bon: Monkey with a Tool Belt	Bob Boyle; Michael J. Goldberg; Kurt Mueller; Gabe Pulliam	4	2020		Netflix	Brown Bag Films	
Octonauts: Above & Beyond	—N/a	6	2021	present	Netflix	Mainframe Studios	Rights held by Wanda Studios
The Creature Cases	Gabe Pulliam; Adam Idelson; Bryan Korn; Amy Koudelka; Kurt Mueller; Alex Red	7	2022	present	Netflix (worldwide); Tencent Video (China)	TeamTO; Tencent Video Productions (2022–23; 2025–present)	Produced as Silvergate Media from 2022 to 2023
SuperKitties	Paula Rosenthal	3	2023	present	Disney Jr.	Disney Kids & Family	Rights held by Disney Platform Distribution
Upcoming
Messi and the Giants	Guy Toubes; Dan Creteur	TBA	2027	TBA	Disney Channel	Leo Messi Management; Sony Music Vision; Atlantis Animation	
Bewitched	TBA	TBA	TBA	TBA	TBA	Flying Bark Productions	
The Partridge Family	TBA	TBA	TBA	TBA	TBA	—N/a	
Wheel of Fortune	TBA	TBA	TBA	TBA	TBA	Sony Pictures Television Game Shows	
Shark Tank	TBA	TBA	TBA	TBA	TBA	—N/a	
Stuart Little	TBA	TBA	TBA	TBA	TBA	—N/a	
Sharks on Wheels	Bryan Korn; Chantal Arisohn	TBA	TBA	TBA	TBA	—N/a	
Hotel Whiskers	TBA	TBA	TBA	TBA	TBA	—N/a	
The Powers	TBA	TBA	TBA	TBA	TBA	Sow You Entertainment	
Slayer Family Band	TBA	TBA	TBA	TBA	TBA	—N/a	
Untitled series	TBA	TBA	TBA	TBA	TBA	CMedia	
Charlie's Angels	TBA	TBA	TBA	TBA	TBA	Floresta Productions	

=== Specials ===
Title	Released	Network	Co-production with
Octonauts and the Amazon Adventure	2013	CBeebies	Brown Bag Films
Octonauts and the Mariana Trench Adventure	2013	CBeebies	Brown Bag Films
Octonauts and a Very Vegimal Christmas	2013	CBeebies	Brown Bag Films
Octonauts and the Over, Under Adventure	2014	CBeebies	Brown Bag Films
Octonauts and the Great Arctic Adventure	2014	CBeebies	Brown Bag Films
Octonauts and Operation Deep Freeze	2015	CBeebies	Brown Bag Films
Octonauts and the Great Swamp Search	2016	CBeebies	Brown Bag Films
Octonauts and the Caves of Sac Actun	2020	Netflix	Mainframe Studios
Octonauts and the Great Barrier Reef	2020	Netflix	Mainframe Studios
Chico Bon Bon and the Very Berry Holiday	2020	Netflix	Brown Bag Films
Octonauts and the Ring of Fire	2021	Netflix	Mainframe Studios

=== Feature film ===
Title	Released	Network	Co-production with
Hilda and the Mountain King	2021	Netflix	Mercury Filmworks; Nobrow Press

=== Scrapped series ===
Title	Creator(s) / Developer(s)	Network / Platform	Co-production with	Notes
Made by Maddie	Paula Rosenthal	Nick Jr.	Mainframe Studios	

== See also ==
- Adelaide Productions
- Sony Pictures Animation
- Screen Gems (1921–1946)
- List of animation studios owned by Sony
