= Mercury Filmworks =

Canadian animation studio

- Logo used since 2021
- Industry: Animation
- Founded: June 21, 1997; 29 years ago in Vancouver, British Columbia, Canada
- Founder: Clint Eland
- Headquarters: Ottawa, Ontario, Canada
- Key people: Clint Eland (president and CEO)
- Number of employees: 250 (2016)
- Divisions: Lighthouse Studios (50% with Cartoon Saloon)
- Website: mercuryfilmworks.com

Mercury Filmworks is a Canadian independent animation studio based in Ottawa, Ontario. The studio was originally founded in Vancouver by Clint Eland, the current CEO, in 1997. Mercury Filmworks has produced animated television series and feature films for a variety of companies, including Disney, Netflix, Amazon Studios, and Warner Bros. Its recent projects include Kid Cosmic, Centaurworld, Hilda, The Wonderful World of Mickey Mouse, and The Ghost and Molly McGee. The studio has won Emmy Awards for its work in several categories, most recently for Hilda.

Mercury has over 340 employees employed at its Ottawa location, and continues to show steady growth. In 2020, it was named one of the best offices in Ottawa by the Ottawa Business Journal.

== History ==
Mercury Filmworks was founded in 1997 in Vancouver by current chief executive officer Clint Eland. The studio started with a small investment from friends and family, including Reg Eland, who became a partner overseeing finances from 1997 to 2002 and managing partner of the Vancouver studio from 2003 to 2006.

In the late 1990s, technology was evolving to allow artists to paint and render images at a much faster pace and with greater and more consistent results. Mercury Filmworks was one of the first companies in North America to specialize in digital ink and paint services in Canada.

In 2000, Mercury opened a studio location on King Street East in Toronto to satisfy a multi-year output deal for its services. Meanwhile, in its Vancouver studio, they produced D'Myna Leagues using digital ink & paint plus CG integration, creating the first Canadian animated television series to integrate 3D locations in a 2D series.

In 2004, Mercury moved its Toronto studio to Ottawa, where local animation director, Jerry Popowich, joined the company as a partner.

The studio was already a leader in the field of computer assisted traditional animation. However, in its Ottawa studio with the help of people like Director Christian Larocque, Rob Buchanan, Anthony Ng, Dave Merrit, Phil Lafrance, Graham Macdonald, Emma Gignac, and Craig Berry, it leveraged this to become one of the world's first companies to produce an animated television series entirely in one studio using the beta version of Toon Boom Animation's Harmony software. Using this software, they produced the series Mischief City for Shaftesbury Films and YTV.

The following year, the studio animated Gerald McBoing-Boing. This production was widely regarded as a new benchmark for quality in digital animation.

In 2007, the studio developed and co-produced Toot & Puddle with National Geographic for the Nick Jr. Channel. This was the first use of advanced builds and rigging techniques resulting in a level of animation that was indistinguishable from hand drawn. This series set the new world bar for digital animation. Toot & Puddle was also one of Mercury's first proprietary series.

In 2008, Mercury Filmworks collaborated with Walt Disney Television Animation on Kick Buttowski: Suburban Daredevil. The series was the first full television series project with Disney and one of Mercury's first hybrid productions where characters were animated interchangeably and indistinguishably in both 2D and 3D. The series was one of the first examples of character-based CG Assists in a long form series. The studio collaborated with Disney once more with Fish Hooks.

The studio again collaborated with Disney on Jake and the Never Land Pirates in 2009. The animation project pushed advanced builds and rigging techniques to a new level.

From 2013 to 2019, Mercury Filmworks animated the Mickey Mouse shorts and television specials for Disney Television Animation, once again collaborating with Disney and Director Paul Rudish on the award-winning reinvention of the character. The shorts have been widely regarded as the new benchmark when it comes to making digital animation look indistinguishable from the highest-quality hand-drawn animation.

2013 brought the fourth Disney-Mercury production, The Lion Guard, based on the theatrical animated film The Lion King (1994). The series involved advanced builds and rigging and heavy use of CG integration techniques for character and location assists. The series set the standard for feature-quality animation in long form television animation.

Two years later, the studio produced Disney's Rapunzel's Tangled Adventure, a television adaptation of another Disney theatrical animated film, Tangled. The methodologies used in the production were built upon the innovative techniques developed for The Lion Guard, and was to push animation and character performance levels to a new high. Mercury continued to collaborate with Disney for the first season of Star vs. the Forces of Evil, Legend of the Three Caballeros, and The Ghost and Molly McGee.

Mercury Filmworks produced Hilda, an adaptation of the graphic novels of the same name, for Silvergate Media and Netflix from 2018 to 2023. The series is one of the first that did not push the bar in terms of process or technology, with its artists involved focused on art, craft, and storytelling. The series has gone on to attain critical acclaim and is one of Netflix's most widely renowned and successful animated series. It is widely referenced as a benchmark in storytelling.

Mercury began to collaborate with Apple Studios to produce content for Apple TV+ in 2022, producing the show Interrupting Chicken. This partnership continued into two further series: Strange Planet and Goldie, all based on existing media.

On January 31st, 2026, animator Kiana Mai, also known as Kiana Khansmith, revealed that Mercury would animate the first episode of Pretty Pretty Please I Don't Want to be a Magical Girl.

== Television series ==
Show	Year(s)	Co-production with	Notes
The Harveytoons Show	1998	Harvey Films	Intro and film restoration
Ned's Newt	1998–1999	Nelvana; Studio B Productions	Season 2
Yvon of the Yukon	2000–2004	Studio B Productions	Digital ink and paint
Mega Babies	2000	CinéGroupe	
Rainbow Fish	2000–2001	Decode Entertainment	
Rescue Heroes	2000–2002	Nelvana	Seasons 2–3
D'Myna Leagues	2001–2002	Studio B Productions	Digital paint
Undergrads	2001	Decode Entertainment	Digital ink and paint
Maggie and the Ferocious Beast	2002	Nelvana	Season 3
The New Woody Woodpecker Show	2002	Universal Cartoon Studios	Season 3 (digital ink and paint)
Dark Oracle	2004–2005	Cookie Jar Entertainment	Season 1
6teen	2004–2006	Nelvana	Seasons 1–2
Mischief City	2005	Shaftesbury Films	
Krypto the Superdog	2005	Warner Bros. Animation	Compositing, ink and paint
Gerald McBoing-Boing	2005–2007	Cookie Jar Entertainment; Classic Media	
Class of the Titans	2005–2008	Studio B Productions; Nelvana	Digital ink and paint
Grossology	2006–2007	Nelvana	Season 1
Ruby Gloom	2006–2008	Nelvana	Additional animation services
Weird Years	2006	Lenz Entertainment	
Harry and His Bucket Full of Dinosaurs	2007–2008	CCI Entertainment	Season 2
Wilbur	2007–2008	Chilco Productions	
Wayside	2007	Nelvana	
World of Quest	2008–2009	Cookie Jar Entertainment	
Toot and Puddle	2008	National Geographic Kids	
Jimmy Two-Shoes	2009–2012	Breakthrough Entertainment	Season 2 co-animated with Elliott Animation
Producing Parker	2009–2011	Breakthrough Entertainment	
Kick Buttowski: Suburban Daredevil	2010–2012	Disney Television Animation	
Doodlebops Rockin’ Road Show	2010	Cookie Jar Entertainment	
Fish Hooks	2010–2014	Disney Television Animation	
Jake and the Never Land Pirates	2011–2015	Disney Television Animation	Seasons 1–3
Bad Seeds	2013	Nickelodeon Animation Studio	Pilot
Mickey Mouse	2013–2019	Disney Television Animation	
Stella and Sam	2013–2014	Radical Sheep Productions	Season 1 and specials
Wander Over Yonder	2013–2014	Disney Television Animation	Pilot and Season 1
Fangbone!	2014	Radical Sheep Productions	Pilot
Penn Zero: Part-Time Hero	2014–2015	Disney Television Animation	Pilot and Season 1
Star vs. the Forces of Evil	2015	Disney Television Animation	Pilot and Season 1
Pickle and Peanut	2015	Disney Television Animation	"Greg"
If You Give a Mouse a Cookie	2015–2021	Amazon Studios	Season 2 co-animated with Lighthouse Studios
Atomic Puppet	2016–2017	Gaumont Animation; Technicolor	
The Lion Guard	2016–2019	Disney Television Animation	
Tangled: The Series	2017–2020	Disney Television Animation	Also animated the TV Movie/Pilot
Legend of the Three Caballeros	2018	Disney Digital Network	Co-animated with Atomic Cartoons and Six Point Harness
Hilda	2018–2023	Silvergate Media	Season 1 co-animated with Atomic Cartoons
Guardians of the Galaxy	2019	Marvel Animation	"Black Vortex, Part 1"
The Wonderful World of Mickey Mouse	2020–2023	Disney Television Animation	
Centaurworld	2021	Netflix Animation	Animation services
Kid Cosmic	2021–2022	Netflix Animation	Animation services
The Ghost and Molly McGee	2021–2024	Disney Television Animation	Animation services
Interrupting Chicken	2022–2023	Apple Studios	
Strange Planet	2023	Apple Studios	
Badjelly	2025	Mukpuddy Animation	
Goldie	2025	Apple Studios	Pre-production and Post-production
The Proud Family: Louder and Prouder	2025–2026	Disney Television Animation	Animation services; Season 3-4
Rick and Morty	2026–present	Williams Street	Season 9 co-animated with Lighthouse Studios
Pretty Pretty Please I Don't Want to be a Magical Girl	2026–present	Kiana Khansmith	
Octicorn & Friends	TBA	Stim Studio	
Pangors of Puddle Peak	TBA	TBA	

=== Lighthouse Studios ===
Show	Year(s)	Client	Notes
The Bug Diaries	2019	Amazon Studios	
If You Give A Mouse A Cookie	2019–2021	Amazon Studios	Season 2
Little Ellen	2021–2022	Warner Bros. Animation	
The Cuphead Show!	2022	Netflix Animation	
El Deafo	2022	Apple Video Programming	
Rick and Morty	2023–present	Williams Street	Season 7–present

== Specials/shorts ==
Feature	Year(s)	Client	Notes
Little Witch	1999	Sony Wonder	Digital paint and effects
Something Else	2000	Pearson Television	Pilot short
Santa Mouse and the Ratdeer	2000	Sony Wonder	Digital ink and paint
Timothy Tweedle the First Christmas Elf	2000	Evening Sky	
Animated American	2008	James Baker and Joe Haidar	Short film
Uncookedland	2011	Disney Television Animation	Pilot
Shred Force	2012	Disney Television Animation	Pilot
The Thunderbeards	2012	Disney Television Animation	Pilot
The Rapscallions	2012	Disney Television Animation	Pilot
The Lion Guard: Return of the Roar	2015	Disney Television Animation	
Duck the Halls: A Mickey Mouse Christmas Special	2016	Disney Television Animation	
Tangled: Before Ever After	2017	Disney Television Animation	
The Scariest Story Ever: A Mickey Mouse Halloween Spooktacular!	2017	Disney Television Animation	
Oh Canada! A Coast to Coast Celebration of 150 Years	2017		Short film
The Lion Guard: The Rise of Scar	2017	Disney Television Animation	
Canticos	2018–2020	Encantos Media	
Mercury Shorts	2021–present		
Katz Café	2023	Disney Television Animation	Animation test
Once Upon a Studio	2023	Walt Disney Animation Studios	additional animation services (uncredited)
A Mouse Called Julian	TBA	Flying Eye Books	

== Films ==
Film	Year	Client	Notes
The Tigger Movie	2000	Walt Disney Television Animation	"Someone Like Me" sequence
Joseph: King of Dreams	2000	DreamWorks Animation	
The Kid	2001	Nelvana	
The Little Bear Movie	2001	Nelvana	
The Powerpuff Girls Movie	2002	Warner Bros. Pictures; Cartoon Network Studios	Additional 2D composite and visual effects; Co-animated with Rough Draft Korea
Looney Tunes: Back in Action	2003	Warner Bros. Feature Animation	Additional digital ink and paint, animation
Fat Albert	2004	20th Century Studios	animation
The Legend of Frosty the Snowman	2005	Classic Media	Additional digital ink and paint, compositing
Curious George	2006	Universal Animation Studios	Digital ink and paint services
Scooby-Doo! Stage Fright	2013	Warner Bros. Animation	main title animation
Team Hot Wheels: The Origin of Awesome	2014	Mattel	
Tangled: Before Ever After	2017	Disney Television Animation	
Hilda and the Mountain King	2021	Silvergate Media	
The Bob's Burgers Movie	2022	20th Century Studios; Bento Box Entertainment; Wilo Productions	Co-animated with Lighthouse Studios
Once Our Land	TBA	Goodbye Productions	

== Theme parks ==
Attraction	Year	Client	Notes
Mickey & Minnie's Runaway Railway	2020	Walt Disney Imagineering	Animated sequences
