= Hilda and the Mountain King =

2021 film directed by Andy Coyle

- Poster by Luke Pearson
- Directed by: Andy Coyle
- Written by: Luke Pearson
- Based on: Hilda and the Mountain King by Luke Pearson
- Produced by: Rachel Simon; Steve Jacobson; Chantal Ling
- Starring: Bella Ramsey; Ameerah Falzon-Ojo; Oliver Nelson; Daisy Haggard; Rasmus Hardiker; John Hopkins; Lucy Montgomery; Dino Kelly; Rachel August; Agnes Peacock
- Edited by: John McKinnon
- Music by: Ryan Carlson
- Production companies: Silvergate Media; Mercury Filmworks; Nobrow Press
- Distributed by: Netflix
- Release date: December 30, 2021
- Running time: 84 minutes
- Countries: United States; United Kingdom; Canada
- Language: English

Hilda and the Mountain King, marketed as Hilda: The Mountain King, is a 2021 animated adventure fantasy film directed by Andy Coyle and written by Luke Pearson. It is based on the sixth edition of the Hilda graphic novel series of the same name by Pearson and is a continuation of the second-season finale of the Hilda animated series. The film features the voices of Bella Ramsey, Ameerah Falzon-Ojo, Oliver Nelson, Daisy Haggard, Rasmus Hardiker, John Hopkins and Lucy Montgomery.

Production of Hilda and the Mountain King started in late 2019, and the film was produced by Silvergate Media and Mercury Filmworks. The opening credits were animated by Giant Ant. A trailer for the movie released on December 2, 2021, and was released as a Netflix film on December 30, 2021. This film is dedicated to Kevin Kocvar and Terry O'Reilley, members of the animation department who died during production of the film.

== Plot ==
Picking up from the end of the season 2 finale "The Stone Forest", Hilda, now a troll, runs away from Trylla, her troll mother, and is petrified by the sunlight when she leaves the Stone Forest. Meanwhile, in Trolberg, Johanna discovers Baba in Hilda's place, and Tontu deduces Hilda had been the victim of a changeling spell. Realizing what this means, Johanna, Baba, Tontu, Alfur, and Twig go searching for Hilda but are unable to locate the entrance into the Stone Forest.

Elsewhere, Erik Ahlberg holds a press conference in which he announces a curfew because of the increasing troll activity outside Trolberg. While watching, David's mother becomes intrigued by an advertisement to volunteer for the Trolberg Safety Patrol. Later, the students of Edmund Ahlberg Elementary School are shown a safety video about trolls, but Frida and David protest the inaccurate information portrayed in the video.

As evening approaches and with still no sign of Hilda, Johanna runs into a group of Safety Patrol officers, and reluctantly returns home. After sunset, Hilda unpetrifies, and finds herself unable to return to Trolberg because of the belltowers. As she retreats, Hilda stumbles upon a huge cave with dozens of bells hanging from the top of the entrance. Inside, she finds a gigantic troll, who calls himself Trundle. He tells Hilda he will help her become human again if she completes some tasks for him. He also assures her that Trylla means no harm, and Hilda reluctantly returns to Trylla. They retreat into the Stone Forest to escape the rising sun. When the two arrive outside the mountains, Hilda "feels" a strange sound, which Trylla explains is something that all trolls hear, calling them to the city of Trolberg, and that the call has been growing stronger lately.

Frida and David discover Hilda's predicament when Baba escapes from Tontu's care and so Frida, against the advice of Kaisa, the librarian skilled in witchcraft, unsuccessfully attempts a body swap spell. Night falls again, and Hilda begins the first of the tasks given to her by Trundle by secretly bringing a cup of troll mead to him. Trundle then instructs her to remove the bells that trap him in the cave.

Later, Trylla shows Hilda the ruins of the castle of the Mountain King, a giant troll who tried to rally the trolls into attacking Trolberg, but was defeated. Hilda doubles down on helping Trundle after Trylla tells her that the changeling spell cannot be undone. She uses pillows, stolen from a troll's treasure collection, to silence and remove the bells. Elsewhere, Johanna and Alfur find the entrance to the Stone Forest, but the trolls close it before they can enter. The two are then attacked by a group of aggressive trolls and narrowly escape.

The following morning, Johanna begrudgingly seeks Erik Ahlberg's help as a last resort. Frustrated by being unable to help Hilda, Frida suggests that she and David sneak out of the city so she can try magically communicating with a troll like she did with the mother Kraken in season 2. Meanwhile, Trundle sends Hilda on her final errand: to bring him a large red orb, hidden in the ruins of the castle among the hoard of the Mountain King. When Hilda touches it, she is thrown into a strange vision in which a giant creature resembling her mother looms over the walls of Trolberg. Hilda is then whisked back into reality, and she attempts to bring the red orb back to Trundle, only to be attacked by a giant bearded troll.

Outside, Ahlberg, Johanna, Baba, Alfur, and Tontu arrive at the entrance to the Stone Forest. Just as Baba opens the entrance, Hilda rushes out, chased by the bearded troll. A fight ensues, ending with Ahlberg being knocked unconscious and Hilda causing the troll to accidentally crush Johanna's car and fall into a ravine. Hilda and her mother are reunited and they bring the orb to Trundle's cave. Trylla, having followed them, appears and is reunited with Baba, reversing the changeling spell, and making Hilda human again, and Baba a troll again. Suddenly, Trundle bursts from his prison, unveiling the orb to be his eye. With his sight now restored, it is revealed that he is the Mountain King, and he incites the trolls to storm Trolberg.

In Trolberg, David distracts his mother in the belltower so Frida can make a mental connection with one of the trolls, and she sees a similar vision to the one Hilda saw; a giant troll-like being resembling her mother, attacking the city. Meanwhile, Trundle begins destroying the bell towers but is halted by the arrival of the bearded troll, revealed to be his brother. Refusing to fight him, Trundle has his followers restrain his brother before breaching the city wall.

The Safety Patrol arrives to fight off the attack, with Ahlberg taking back control. Hilda, remembering the vision from Trundle's eye, realizes that the mother of all trolls lies underneath the city, and she will rise up to defend her children if the Safety Patrol attacks them, destroying all of Trolberg in the process. Hilda attempts to prevent the attack, but Ahlberg refuses to listen to her, and uses the Safety Patrol's cannon to destroy Trundle, awakening the mother troll. In a last-ditch attempt to stop him, Hilda takes Trundle's eye and throws it into Ahlberg's face, causing him to see a similar vision to what Hilda saw. Now understanding what is at stake, Ahlberg orders the Safety Patrol to stand down.

The mother troll stops trying to get up, and the trolls all walk peacefully to the center of the city where she rests. Using Frida's magic, Hilda and Frida learn her identity: Amma, the mother and grandmother of all trolls, having lain dormant for centuries so as to not disturb the humans who built Trolberg above her. For a while, the trolls could still reconnect with their buried mother, but then the settlers, unaware of Amma's presence and thus why the creatures kept wandering into the city, drove them away, eventually erecting a wall to keep them out. Now that the trolls are close enough to Amma, they can finally hear her voice again, causing them to sprout plants all over their bodies.

In the aftermath, Ahlberg resigns after accepting a medal for his eventual handling of the crisis and relinquishes control of the Safety Patrol to his deputy Gerda Gustav. Gustav immediately announces a "Night of the Trolls", in which the trolls are allowed into the city once a year to reunite with Amma. While some humans still fear the trolls and vice versa, the annual peaceful exposure is gradually eroding the mutual fear between the two species. Hilda's and Baba's families still maintain contact with each other, with Baba occasionally visiting Hilda's home and Hilda occasionally spending a night in the mountains with Trylla and Baba.

== Cast ==
- Bella Ramsey as Hilda
- Ameerah Falzon-Ojo as Frida
- Oliver Nelson as David
- Daisy Haggard as Johanna
- Rasmus Hardiker as Alfur Aldric
- John Hopkins as Erik Ahlberg
- Lucy Montgomery as Gerda Gustav, additional voices
- Rachel August as Trylla
- Dino Kelly as Trundle
- Agnes Peacock as Baba

== Production ==
Megan Ferguson, the assistant director, announced on Twitter on July 23, 2021, that production for the film had wrapped. On November 23, 2021, it was confirmed that the film would release on December 30, 2021.

=== Writing ===
Pearson wrote the script of the film. The film's director Andy Coyle praised Pearson's script and said that the film was "such a fun thing to do."

=== Animation ===
Most of the film's animation was done by Mercury Filmworks using Toon Boom Animation software. The animation for the opening credits was done by Giant Ant.

=== Music ===
Ryan Carlson composed the music for the film. The song When I Can't Sleep by Icelandic musical group Pascal Pinon is featured in the film, though it is absent from the soundtrack. The ending song Another Road was composed and sung by Ray Aggs & Vice Cooler.

==== Official soundtrack ====
Hilda and the Mountain King (Original Motion Picture Soundtrack)

Soundtrack album by Ryan Carlson
- Released: June 16, 2023
- Recorded: 2021
- Genre: Soundtrack
- Length: 42:53
- Label: Madison Gate Records

The soundtrack for the movie was released through digital platforms by Madison Gate Records on June 16, 2023.

All music is composed by Ryan Carlson, except where noted.

No.	Title	Performer(s)	Length
1.	"Escape"		2:36
2.	"Hilda and the Mountain King Main Title"		0:56
3.	"The Search Begins"		0:52
4.	"Press Conference"		1:27
5.	"I Was Going Home"		1:27
6.	"Into The Woods"		0:26
7.	"Trundle"		3:09
8.	"The Call"		1:28
9.	"Ask Kaisa"		0:40
10.	"Troll Breakfast"		1:24
11.	"The Story"		2:11
12.	"What Do We Do?"		1:41
13.	"Hoards"		0:24
14.	"Race You To the Top of the Mountain?"		1:30
15.	"The Meeting"		1:03
16.	"The Final Thing"		1:51
17.	"Hilda!"		0:51
18.	"Reunited"		1:05
19.	"Prison Cell"		0:31
20.	"Trundle Escapes"		0:51
21.	"Troll Army"		1:02
22.	"Brothers"		1:06
23.	"Been Here Before"		2:13
24.	"Prepare to Fire!"		1:33
25.	"Trundle Falls"		2:01
26.	"Throw Me!"		0:38
27.	"Stand Down"		0:43
28.	"Amma"		3:34
29.	"Epilogue"		2:02
30.	"Another Road"	Ray Aggs; Vice Cooler	3:11
Total length:			42:53

== Release ==
The film was released on December 30, 2021, as a Netflix original.

=== Marketing ===
On December 10, 2019, it was announced that Sony Pictures Television would be acquiring 100% of Silvergate Media for an undisclosed amount. In this acquisition, a Hilda movie special was announced to be in production, and was initially supposed to be 70 minutes in length. On October 12, 2020, licensingsource.net reported that the special would be coming out in 2021. On September 23, 2021, the YouTuber, The 2nd Dimension, interviewed Andy Coyle, who revealed that the special would instead be an estimated 85 minutes in length. (Note: The original source of this information came from a Patreon-only version of the original full-length interview, the portion was later deleted when it was released to the public. The clip has since been released publicly on November 25, 2021.) On November 19, 2021, Silvergate revealed its official title, Hilda and the Mountain King. On November 23, 2021, official promotional images were revealed with a December 30 release date being confirmed. On November 24, 2021, a new screen grab from the movie was revealed in an article by Popsugar.

On December 2, 2021, the trailer was officially revealed on the Netflix page for the film. On December 22, 2021, it was revealed that Giant Ant would be producing the opening credits of the film, along with new screen grabs and production assets.

== Reception ==
=== Critical response ===
Reviews of the film were positive. Nicole Clark of Polygon said the film raises the stakes from the animated series "appropriately," tackling mysteries of Trolberg, praises the film for not pulling any punches, but has a "more consistently dark" tone, and sets the stage for the show's third season. Aatqa Arham of Variety argued that while the storyline is "seemingly simple," it is filled with "emotional and philosophical wisdom," questioning the good and evil dichotomy, and said the film makes a statement that "the world...needs to change." Joshua Fox of Screen Rant described the film as featuring "stunning visuals and music" and has a story which "elevates the source material to a tremendous degree." Joey DeAngelis of Los Angeles described the film as teasing a "satisfying culmination" of the show's first two seasons.

=== Accolades ===
Year	Award	Category	Recipient(s)	Result	Ref.
2022	Annie Awards	Best Direction - TV/Media	Andy Coyle	Nominated	
2022	Annie Awards	Best Music – TV/ Media	Ryan Carlson	Nominated	
2022	Children's and Family Emmy Awards	Outstanding Special Class Animated Program	Kurt Mueller, Luke Pearson, Stephanie Simpson, Andy Coyle, Bryan Korn, Steve Jacobson, Chantal Ling, Rachel Simon, Emerald Wright-Collie and Victor Reyes	Won	
2022	Children's and Family Emmy Awards	Outstanding Directing for an Animated Program	Andy Coyle and Megan Ferguson	Nominated	
2022	Children's and Family Emmy Awards	Outstanding Voice Directing for an Animated Series	Dave Peacock	Nominated	
2022	Children's and Family Emmy Awards	Outstanding Main Titles and Graphics	Melissa Buisán, Jay Grandin, Conor Whelan and Eric Pautz	Won	

== Works cited ==
- This article incorporates material derived from the "Hilda and the Mountain King (movie)" article on the hildatheseries wiki at Fandom (formerly Wikia) and is licensed under the Creative Commons Attribution-Share Alike 3.0 License (January 2021).
