= Rasmus Hardiker =

British actor (born 1985)

- Born: 31 January 1985 (age 41); Sutton Coldfield, West Midlands, England
- Occupation: Actor
- Years active: 2005–present
- Notable credit(s): Thomas & Friends as Bill and Philip (UK/US) and Monty (UK)

Rasmus Hardiker (born 31 January 1985) is a British actor. He is best known for voicing Scott and Alan Tracy in the reboot animated television series Thunderbirds Are Go. He played Raymond in Steve Coogan's sitcom Saxondale and Ben in the Jack Dee comedy Lead Balloon. Hardiker was also in the BBC3 sketch series The Wrong Door.

He joined the voice cast of Thomas & Friends, voicing several characters in the UK and USA versions. He is also known for voicing Alfur in Hilda.

== Early life ==
Hardiker was born on 31 January 1985 in Sutton Coldfield, West Midlands. He attended The Arthur Terry School in Sutton Coldfield, where he obtained an A-level in drama.

== Career ==
At the age of 20, he started his acting career as he played the role of Philip Chase in the miniseries The Rotters' Club (2005).

From 2006 to 2007, Hardiker played Raymond in the television series Saxondale, featuring Steve Coogan. From 2006 to 2011, he starred alongside Jack Dee in the comedy series Lead Balloon. In 2011, he starred in the comic fantasy film Your Highness alongside Danny McBride, James Franco, Natalie Portman, and Zooey Deschanel.

He made guest appearances in Shakespeare Re-Told, The Bill, Doctors, New Tricks, and Afterlife. In 2014, he starred as Harry in the Black Mirror episode "White Christmas".

From 2018 to 2019, he played Kem, a regular in the Superman spin-off prequel series Krypton.

From 2012–2013, Hardiker voiced various characters in the Disney Channel musical comedy series Groove High. From 2015 to 2020, he provided the voices of Scott and Alan Tracy in the reboot animated television series Thunderbirds Are Go. He then joined the voice cast of Thomas & Friends, where he voices Philip, Monty, and the Troublesome Trucks. He took over for Jonathan Broadbent as the voice of Bill, starting with the twenty-second series. He also provided the voice of Alfur in Hilda.

== Filmography ==
=== Film ===
Year	Title	Role	Notes
2006	Starter for 10	University Challenge competitor	
2007	Magicians	Dwight	
2007	I Want Candy	Christi	
2008	Lezione 21	Broderip	
2008	Faintheart	Comic Book Fan 1	
2009	Huge	Josh	
2011	Your Highness	Courtney	
2012	Cockneys vs Zombies	Terry Macguire	
2015	Capture the Flag	Marty Farr (voice)	English version
2015	Peter & Wendy	Mr. Smee, Smith	
2016	Thomas & Friends: The Great Race	Philip (voice)	
2017	Journey Beyond Sodor	Philip (voice)	
2017	Mary and the Witch's Flower	Zebedee (voice)	English version
2017	The Little Vampire 3D	Rudolph Sackville-Bagg, Gregory Sackville-Bagg (voices)	
2020	Dennis & Gnasher: Unleashed! On the Big Screen	Walter (voice)	
2021	Hilda and the Mountain King	Alfur (voice)	
2025	Wildcat	Edward	

=== Television ===
Year	Title	Role	Notes
2005	The Rotters' Club	Philip Chase	
2005	Afterlife	James	Episode: "More Than Meets the Eye"
2005	ShakespeaRe-Told: Much Ado About Nothing	Vince	
2005	Funland	Hitman	4 episodes
2005	A Waste of Shame: The Mystery of Shakespeare and His Sonnets	Ned Bounty	
2005	The Bill	Martin	1 episode
2006	Doctors	Josh Parrish	Episode: "Fiddler on the Roof"
2006–2007	Saxondale	Raymond	
2006–2011	Lead Balloon	Ben	
2007	The Lift	Rocco	
2007	The Good Samaritan	Phil	
2007	New Tricks	Sean	Episode: "Father's Pride"
2007	Christmas at the Riviera	Luke	
2007	The Wrong Door	Various characters	
2008	Micro Men	Shop assistant	
2012–2013	Groove High	Various characters	
2013	Dude, That's My Ghost!	Spencer Wright (voice)	Main cast
2014–2017	Boyster	Rafik, Arthur (voices)	Main cast
2014	Black Mirror	Harry	Feature-length special "White Christmas"
2015	Scream Street	Resus Negative, various	Main cast
2015–2020	Thunderbirds Are Go	Scott Tracy, Alan Tracy, additional voices	Main cast
2015–2019	Danger Mouse	Count Duckula, Ian, Jimmy Camel, Monsieur Aubrey le Camembert (voices)	Recurring cast
2015–2019	Thomas & Friends	Monty (voice)	UK version
2015–2019	Thomas & Friends	Troublesome Trucks (The Fastest Red Engine on Sodor only), Bill (Series 22 onwards), Philip (voices)	Recurring cast, succeeding Jonathan Broadbent as the voice of Bill
2016–2020	Floogals	Fleeker	Main cast
2016–2019	Digby Dragon	Chips	Recurring cast
2016	Shaun the Sheep	The Farmer's Nephew	Episode: "The Farmer's Nephew"
2017–2021	Numberblocks	Eighteen, Eighty-One (voices)	
2017	Ronja, the Robber's Daughter	Fjosok, Pelje, Tjorm, Sturkas (voices)	English dub
2017–2021	Dennis & Gnasher: Unleashed!	Walter Brown, Grizzly Griller (voices)	Main cast
2017–present	The Heroic Quest of the Valiant Prince Ivandoe	Ivandoe, Bert (voices)	Main cast
2017–present	The Tiny Bunch	Turtle	Season 2
2018–2019	Krypton	Kem	Main cast
2018–2019	Lilybuds	Ellery	Main cast
2018–2023	Hilda	Alfur (voice)	Main cast
2019–2020	101 Dalmatian Street	Hansel the Husky (voice)	Recurring cast
2019–2020	Ricky Zoom	Steel Awesome (voice)	6 episodes
2020	Dr. Panda TotoTime	Dr. Panda (voice)	
2021–2022	Blippi Wonders	Santa, Ernie the Eraser (voices)	11 episodes
2022	Mammals	Briggsy	3 episodes
2022	The Unstoppable Yellow Yeti	Osmo (voice)	4 episodes
2022	Best & Bester	A.N. Other (voice)	
2023	Van der Walk	Herman Zaal	Episode: "Redemption in Amsterdam"
2023	Captain Laserhawk: A Blood Dragon Remix	Yellow - Niji 6, Scanner AI, Engineer (voices)	6 episodes
2025	Wolf King	Mikkel (voice)	
2026	Patience	Teo Barbieri	Season 2 Episode 6

=== Video games ===
Year	Title	Role	Notes
2015	Lego Ninjago: Shadow of Ronin	Kai	
2015	Lego Dimensions	Additional voices	
2016	Steep	Pointe Percee	
2017	Xenoblade Chronicles 2	Tora	English version
2017	Dragon Quest XI	The Luminary, Calasmos, additional voices	
2019	Dragon Quest XI S	The Luminary, Calasmos, additional voices	
2023	Disney Illusion Island	Toku	
2023	Lies of P	Gemini	
