= Tommy Donbavand =

British writer

- Born: 28 November 1967
- Died: 14 May 2019 (aged 51)
- Occupations: Author, Playwright, Screenwriter
- Known for: Scream Street, Fangs, Vampire Spy, Doctor Who

Tommy Donbavand (28 November 1967 – 14 May 2019) was an English actor, teacher and writer from Liverpool, best known for his books and comics for children, such as Scream Street. He often wrote under pseudonyms.

== Background ==
Donbavand had a varied career which saw him working as a clown, a holiday camp entertainer and a performer in Buddy - The Buddy Holly Story in London's West End. He also ran acting and writing classes, wrote, produced and directed a number of theatre productions, and wrote a series of non-fiction books in his Quick Fixes for Bored Kids series.

== Career ==
In 2006, Donbavand began writing as B. Strange for the Too Ghoul For School book series, published by Egmont. This led to his own series – Scream Street – being picked up by Walker Books. The first in this series of thirteen novels – Scream Street: Fang of the Vampire – was published in October 2008. In 2015, it was adapted into an animated television series, produced by Coolabi Productions, which began airing on CBBC. Donbavand wrote a number of episodes. A second series was confirmed in 2020.

In April 2013, his Doctor Who novel Shroud of Sorrow featuring the Eleventh Doctor and Clara Oswald was published by BBC Books. He also co-wrote the Shadow Vanguard series of science fiction books under the pseudonym of Tom Dublin.

Donbavand wrote for The Beano comic, initially starting with strips for Calamity James, Gnasher and Gnipper and The Bash Street Kids. Six months later, he was made the main writer for The Bash Street Kids. He also worked on the Badger Graphic Novels range, aimed at struggling readers.

In 2015 and 2016, he also wrote for Doctor Who Adventures magazine including two Doctor Who comic strips and three Doctor Who spin-off short stories featuring the Paternoster Gang.

He wrote another children's series, Fangs, Vampire Spy, as well as the writing handbooks 13 Steps to Beating Writer's Block in 2015, 101 Stunning Story Starters in 2017, and 101 Quick and Quirky Questions in 2018.

== Cancer and death ==
In March 2016, Donbavand was diagnosed with inoperable, stage four throat cancer. He died from the illness in May 2019.

In July 2020, his Doctor Who short audio play, What Lurks Down Under was released posthumously by Big Finish Productions as part of Time Apart, starring Peter Davison as the Fifth Doctor.

== Bibliography ==
- Too Ghoul For School (2007–2008)
- Scream Street (2008–2011)
- Wolf (2011)
- Uniform (2012)
- Doctor Who
  - Shroud of Sorrow (2013)
  - The Ministry of Time (2015)
  - Shock Horror (2016)
  - The Importance of Being Strax (2016)
  - The Terror of the Thames (2016)
  - The Curious Case of the Miniature Menaces (2016)
  - Time Apart (2020)
- Tommy Donbavand's Funny Shorts
- Teen Reads
  - Home
  - Kidnap
  - Ward 13
  - Dead Scared
  - Just Bite
  - Copy Cat
  - Raven
- Gems
  - The Terrible Tale of Melody Doom
  - Once Upon a Time...
- Fangs, Vampire Spy (2013–2014)
  - Operation: Golden Bum
  - Codename: The Tickler
  - Assignment: Royal Rescue
  - Target: Nobody
  - Project: Wolf World
  - Mission: Lullaby
- Space Hoppers
- Time Trek
- 13 Steps to Beating Writer's Block: Free your creativity today! (2015)
- Snow-Man (2016)
- 101 Stunning Story Starters (2017)
- 101 Quick and Quirky Questions (2018)
- Shadow Vanguard (2018–2019)
  - Gravity Storm
  - Lunar Crisis
  - Immortality Curse
  - Ultimate Payback
