= Hilda (TV series) =

2018 animated television series

- Genre: Adventure; Fantasy; Comedy drama
- Created by: Luke Pearson
- Based on: Hilda by Luke Pearson
- Developed by: Luke Pearson; Stephanie Simpson; Kurt Mueller
- Directed by: Andy Coyle; Megan Ferguson
- Voices of: Bella Ramsey; Ameerah Falzon-Ojo; Oliver Nelson; Daisy Haggard; Rasmus Hardiker
- Theme music composer: Grimes
- Opening theme: "Hilda (Main Title Theme)"
- Ending theme: "Hilda's Theme" by Dan Mangan (Note: Other ending themes included: "Annika" composed by Björn Olsson (season 1, episode 11); "Tjörn" composed by Björn Olsson (season 1, episode 13); "The Life of Hilda" performed by Bella Ramsey (season 2, episode 7); "The End" performed by Greta Kline (season 2, episode 13); "Another Road" performed by Ray Aggs ("Hilda and the Mountain King"); "Frequent Letdown" performed by Illuminati Hotties (season 3, episode 4); "Oslo" performed by Seabear (season 3, episode 5); "Big Car" performed by AV0-8 (season 3, episode 6); "Uncrossed Path" performed by Frankie Cosmos (season 3, episode 8))
- Composers: Dan Mangan; Ryan Carlson
- Countries of origin: United Kingdom; Canada; United States
- Original language: English
- No. of seasons: 3
- No. of episodes: 34 (+ 1 film)

Production
- Executive producers: Kurt Mueller; Clint Eland; Bryan Korn
- Producers: Rachel Simon; Chantal Ling; Bryan Korn; Emerald Wright-Collie; Steve Jacobson
- Editor: John McKinnon
- Running time: 23–32 minutes; 46–77 minutes (finales)
- Production companies: Mercury Filmworks; Atomic Cartoons; Nobrow Press; Flying Eye Books; Silvergate Media

Original release
- Network: Netflix
- Release: September 21, 2018 – December 7, 2023

Related
- Hilda and the Mountain King

Hilda is an animated television series based on the graphic novel series of the same name by Luke Pearson. Produced by Silvergate Media and animated by Mercury Filmworks, the series follows the adventures of Hilda, a fearless blue-haired girl who, along with her mother Johanna and her deerfox (Note: A fictional species with features of deer and foxes.) Twig, moves to the fictional city of Trolberg after their old house in the outskirts of a forest is destroyed by a giant. Though moving away from the wild and into a bustling city, Hilda still manages to befriend even the most dangerous of monsters.

The series debuted on Netflix on September 21, 2018. The first two episodes premiered earlier at the New York International Children's Film Festival on February 25, 2018. A second season premiered on December 14, 2020. A film titled Hilda and the Mountain King, which takes place between the second and third seasons, premiered on Netflix on December 30, 2021. A third and final season premiered on December 7, 2023.

The series received critical acclaim throughout its run. It won several Annie Awards, including for "Best Children's Series" for each year that it was eligible, as well as Emmy Awards for "Outstanding Main Title Sequence", "Outstanding Children's TV Series" and "Outstanding Editing in a Daytime Program", tying the latter award with Animaniacs.

== Premise ==
Hilda is a young girl who grew up with her mother Johanna in a small cabin on the edge of the woods near the walled-in Nordic city of Trolberg. Hilda and Johanna soon move permanently to the city for a better life and to give Hilda a proper upbringing. Over the course of the series, she and her deerfox Twig, later accompanied by an elf named Alfur, and best friends Frida and David, go on a number of adventures interacting with and befriending the mysterious animals, people, and spirits that live in and around the city of Trolberg.

== Characters ==
=== Main ===
- Hilda (voiced by Bella Ramsey) – An adventurous 11-year-old (Note: 13-year-old in season 3) Sparrow Scout/Adventurer who loves to explore unknown lands and encounter strange creatures. Born in the woods, she soon moves to the city of Trolberg with great reluctance. However, Hilda is quick to adapt to her new home and environment, eventually becoming street-smart, enrolling in school, learning to bike-ride, and making friends. She temporarily transforms into a troll and learns about their nighttime world, while trying to find a way home.
- Frida (voiced by Ameerah Falzon-Ojo) – Hilda's best friend, a fellow Sparrow Scout, a witch in-training, and one of the top students in their school. She has earned many badges as a Sparrow Scout due to her organization skills.
- David (voiced by Oliver Nelson) – Hilda and Frida's other best friend and fellow Sparrow Scout. He is insecure, easily frightened, loves collecting rocks, and has a knack for attracting insects. Despite his fearful nature, David is loyal, kind, and always there for his friends. David is normally reluctant to accompany Hilda and Frida on potentially dangerous adventures.
  - Ilan Galkoff – David's singing voice
- Johanna (voiced by Daisy Haggard) – Hilda's mother who works as a graphic designer as well as a general store employee. While tolerant of her daughter's adventures, Johanna still frequently fears for Hilda's safety, often becoming upset when Hilda lies about her whereabouts.
- Twig – Hilda's young deerfox pet who was separated from his herd as a cub; Hilda and Johanna adopted him.
- Alfur Aldric (voiced by Rasmus Hardiker). – A paperwork-enthusiast elf who journeys with Hilda to Trolberg to learn about life in the city.
- Tontu (voiced by Rasmus Hardiker) – A nisse who is kicked out of his original home, later coming to live in Hilda's apartment.

=== Recurring ===
All actors listed here are credited only as "Additional Voices" in the end credits. Information on specific characters comes from other sources, and they may play more characters than are mentioned here.

- Erik Ahlberg (voiced by John Hopkins) – The arrogant, glory-seeking head of Trolberg's safety patrol (added in season 2).
- Gerda Gustav (voiced by Lucy Montgomery) – Ahlberg's deputy. In contrast to her boss, Deputy Gustav is extremely competent and wants to keep the people of Trolberg safe (added in season 2).
- Kaisa (Note: Unnamed before the season 2 episode "Chapter 3: The Witch") (voiced by Kaisa Hammarlund) – A librarian witch who helps Hilda research her adventures.
- Trevor (voiced by Reece Pockney) – A local bully.
- Wood Man (voiced by Ako Mitchell) – A brown-coloured, tree-like being who frequently visits Hilda's home usually uninvited.
- Astrid (voiced by Miriam Margolyes (older); Teresa Gallagher [younger]) – Hilda's great-aunt and Johanna's aunt who lives in Tofoten.
- Matilda Pilqvist (voiced by Rachel Atkins) - An old woman and powerful witch who teaches Frida magic.
- The Pooka (voiced by Philippa Rice) – A shapeshifter who keeps asking for random things from Astrid and is always denied.
- Anders (voiced by John Simm) – Hilda's father who wants to spend more time with her.
- Victoria Van Gale (voiced by Rachel Atkins) - A well-meaning mad scientist who tries to improve humanity, but whose projects ends up causing great danger that Hilda must stop.

== Episodes ==
=== Series overview ===
Series	Episodes	Originally released
1	13	21 September 2018
2	13	14 December 2020
Film		30 December 2021
3	8	7 December 2023

=== Season 1 (2018) ===
No. overall	No. in season	Title	Written by	Original release date
1	1	"Chapter 1: The Hidden People"	Stephanie Simpson	September 21, 2018
Hilda, her mother Johanna, and their deerfox Twig, have lived in the wilderness ever since Hilda was born. During one of her adventures, she encounters a troll and removes the bell she had tied onto its nose earlier. Later that day, their house is threatened by small, invisible creatures. Johanna insists they move to Trolberg, but Hilda is determined to fix things so they can stay. She learns that the invisible beings are elves, and she befriends one named Alfur, who arranges a meeting with the prime minister. Despite Hilda's efforts, she learns that only the king can turn things around. Hilda feels dejected, but soon feels better when Alfur decides to take her to the king, even if it violates protocols. Adapted from Hilda and the Troll and Hilda and the Midnight Giant
2	2	"Chapter 2: The Midnight Giant"	Stephanie Simpson	September 21, 2018
That night, Hilda meets the giant from the previous episode, who explains to her that he is waiting for a friend. The next day, Hilda and Johanna visit Trolberg. Hilda is still reluctant about moving, but Johanna tells her to keep an open mind. The Wood Man visits their house and lends her a book about giants, leading Hilda to realize that the giant she encountered was Jorgen, who resides from the highest mountain in the north. The next day, Hilda and Alfur set out to find the Elf King. Unfortunately, to Hilda's anger, he retreats in panic when he sees her. Hilda lashes out, only to be interrupted by the wakening of the mountain, which appeared to be another giant sleeping under layers of snow and soil. Hilda catches the royal palace in time and realizes that this giant is who Jorgen is waiting for. The two giants reunite and just as Hilda and Johanna are free to live in the wilderness once more, Jorgen crushes the house as they walk off to space. A horrified Johanna and Hilda realize they must move to Trolberg now that they know how hard it is for elves to live by other bigger creatures. Johanna, Hilda, Twig, and Alfur head off to Trolberg and settle into their new home. Adapted from Hilda and the Midnight Giant
3	3	"Chapter 3: The Bird Parade"	Kenny Byerly	September 21, 2018
As the city prepares for The Bird Parade, an annual festival to honor The Great Raven, Hilda goes out and attempts to make friends. She spends the day with a group of bullies and is appalled when they begin throwing rocks at birds. One bird gets injured and Hilda brings it back to her apartment. She and Alfur try to speak with the bird, but he has amnesia. The only thing he remembers is needing to find a statue. Before heading out to watch the parade, Johanna discovers the bird and forces him outside. It is revealed that he is The Great Raven, whose job is to bring good fortune to the city. As Alfur and Raven try to find the statue, Trevor finds and captures him, tries to get him to talk and accidentally pushes him into the river. Hilda arrives in time to see the birdcage going underwater, but she manages to remind him that he is the Great Raven. Hilda jumps to the river to save the bird, but with his memory restored he transforms into his larger form and carries Hilda into the sky above the city. He reveals to Hilda that years ago, he landed on the statue, and the people thought he was the messenger of their god. The harvest was bountiful that year and the people believed it was his doing, so they started the festival in his honor. The year he missed the festival was bad, but it has nothing to do with bad luck. He wanted to give the city hope, so he continues coming to the town every year, even though he is not the Great Raven, he is a thunderbird. With everything settled and the parade started back up, Johanna takes Hilda to a special place so they can watch the parade together. Hilda confesses that she might like the city after all. Adapted from Hilda and the Bird Parade
4	4	"Chapter 4: The Sparrow Scouts"	Stephanie Simpson	September 21, 2018
Following Hilda's initiation to the Sparrow Scouts, the scouts receive their first challenge: a beautification of the Trolberg city park. With her new friends, David and Frida, they get to work removing weeds and clearing the land. However, overnight, plantlike creatures called vittra ruin their work and call Hilda, Frida and David out for removing them. The vittra steals Frida's badge sash and Hilda and Frida give chase into underground tunnels where all the vittra live. Hilda manages to stop the vittra that stole it and agrees to save the vittra's friends. Together, the kids and the vittra head off to the mulching machine and manage to save the vittra before they are crushed. Even though they didn't get a badge, they still had fun. As David goes to sleep that night, a rock that he found earlier began to move.
5	5	"Chapter 5: The Troll Rock"	Kenny Byerly	September 21, 2018
On their way to parents' night, Hilda and Johanna meet Principal Magnusson, who is very excited about the grand finale, a dedication ceremony for the school's new statue of one of Trolberg's great founders, Edmund "the Troll Slayer" Ahlberg. During the event, Hilda presents her nittens collection and David presents his collection of rocks. Hilda's teacher, Ms. Hallgrim, asks the students to close the curtains and play a video about the history of the school, but soon after the video starts playing, the projector falls to the floor. David's collection of rocks also appears to be on the floor and Ms. Hallgrim locks up the rocks, assuming that it was Hilda who threw the rocks into the projector. Frida and David tell Hilda that Ms. Hallgrim thinks Hilda is a problem student and wants to transfer her to a class for students with behavioural difficulties. Hilda realizes that one of the stones is a baby troll, and Hilda, Frida and David decide to move it outside the city walls. Frida directs her parents to talk to Ms. Hallgrim in order to distract her, this allows Alfur to open the lock. But just after David takes the baby troll rock, the sun sets, the rock transforms into a baby troll and breaks free, creating chaos and ruining the parents' night. Hilda, Frida and David chase the baby troll all over the school, but to no avail. Ms. Hallgrim and Johanna finally find Hilda and Ms. Hallgrim offers to transfer Hilda to a small transition class. Hilda discovers the baby troll in the ventilation system and catches it. An adult troll then breaks into the school, and Hilda discovers that this troll is the baby troll's mother. She gives it back to its mother, thus saving the day. As the troll mother makes its way back to the wilderness, it destroys the school statue, much to the dismay of the school principal. Ms. Hallgrim and Hilda come to understanding and Hilda stays in her class.
6	6	"Chapter 6: The Nightmare Spirit"	Kenny Byerly	September 21, 2018
Hilda is intrigued by the mystery of a girl who doesn't seem to communicate with anyone in Trolberg. Hilda, Frida and David chase after the girl, but she mysteriously disappears. David admits that he's a little jumpy because he's been having nightmares lately. He believes that Hilda's stories are the cause of his nightmares, particularly the story of how Trolberg's rats tangled their tails and turned into the fearsome Rat King. Hilda suggests finding the Rat King so that David can face his fears an overcome the nightmares. They learn from the Rat King that the girl is causing David's nightmares. Hilda and Frida manage to track the girl down to Huldrawood forest. During the chase, they find out that she can move through obstacles, turning into a green mist. Hilda and Frida see the girl in the other girls' camp by the campfire and hear her laughing as she talks about David's nightmares. Hilda tries to confront her, but all the girls instantly disappear, turning into a green mist. The next day, Hilda, Frida and David, with the help of a librarian, find a book from which they learn that this girl is actually Marra, a nightmare spirit. Late at night, Hilda, Alfur, and Frida set a trap for the Marra, and Hilda challenges the Marra to scare her in exchange for leaving David alone. She lets the Marra give her nightmares and the Marra creates a nightmare focused on Hilda's fear of riding a bike, but she is interrupted by David waking Hilda up. David says that if Hilda can handle nightmares, so can he. The Marra leaves David alone saying that he is "not fun to haunt" anymore now that he is brave enough to ask for nightmares. Hilda asks Frida and David if they can teach her to ride a bicycle.
7	7	"Chapter 7: The Lost Clan"	Ben Joseph	September 21, 2018
To earn the Botany Badge, Hilda suggests finding a rare plant that David once saw. It turns out that this plant grows near a settlement of elves, who immediately start an attack. The elves capture David, but Hilda and Frida manage to escape. They learn from Alfur that these elves - the Lost Clan - were banished by the King of elves for an error made during the execution of a plot of land sale contract. Alfur offers to complete the contract, but the elves declare that they don't use contracts anymore, instead taking their word for it or fighting, leaving Alfur (who is a descendant of the family that also signed the contract) to fight ten elves. Frida asks for a delay to find a loophole in the contract, while David remains a hostage of the elves. The only loophole for the contract to be null and void is to be burned by Lindworm's fire breath. A book in the library reveals that only one Lindworm left in Trolberg's area - on an island. After reaching the island with the help of the Water Spirit, Hilda and Frida find the Lindworm sleeping in the middle of a garden. Hilda tries to burn the contract with Lindworm's breath while he is asleep, but accidentally wakes him up. Lindworm is displeased with such visits and intends to devour Hilda, Frida, and Alfur, but eventually agrees to burn the contract in exchange for the usual plants because he is a green thumb and has been unable to obtain the plants for a long time. Returning to the Lost Clan, Alfur tells them the good news - that the contract is null and void and they can return. However, the elves of the Lost Clan do not want to move; they give ownership of the plot to Alfur and certify it in their own way - by throwing a party.
8	8	"Chapter 8: The Tide Mice"	Stephanie Simpson	September 21, 2018
For the second year in a row, due to various setbacks, David is unable to audition for the Warblers, and Johanna cannot find a job as a graphic designer in Trolberg, so she takes a job in a store. Hilda goes to the library with Twig and wants to find a comfortable place to read a book. Twig scratches a shelf, causing Hilda to find a hidden storage of books, among which she notices "How to Aid and Keep Thy Friends Forever" book. Among the tips there is a magic spell "how to ensure a friend's success in a chosen endeavor". The librarian enters the room and says that this book is for internal circulation only, so Hilda makes a copy of the page and runs to her apartment. For the spell, she immerses David's hair and his musical instrument in a tide pool, and the next morning she finds a mouse there, which she discreetly brings to David. David passes the audition with flying colors. Inspired by her success, Hilda works the same spell with Joanna and she is soon hired as a graphic designer to create bells advertisements. After some time, a worried Frida comes to Hilda and says that something is wrong with David — his eyes light periodically, he growls, and steam comes from his hair. Alfur suggests that these are signs of a spell, and Hilda admits that she cast a spell on David and Joanna. In the library, Hilda, Frida, and Alfur find in a footnote to this page that the spell can be undone within 30 days, otherwise David and Joanna's souls will forever belong to Hilda. As the 30 days come to an end, Hilda decides to perform the spell reversal ritual right on stage during the Warblers performance, since both David and Joanna will be there. After Hilda says the words of the rite, the mice jump out into the hall, but Frida and Hilda catch them, and Hilda tells everyone to get in the car and promises to tell the whole story on the way to the tide pool. The rite is not complete yet, and David and Joanna have another seizure that sends the car spinning out of control, but fortunately rolling toward the coast. Hilda manages to complete the reversal ritual and everyone, including the two mice, returns to Trolberg.
9	9	"Chapter 9: The Ghost"	Kenny Byerly	September 21, 2018
Hilda, David, and Frida investigate why Frida's room isn't staying tidy, and soon find out that a spirit had previously organizing her room in her sleep, and was now neglecting to do so. The friends head to a graveyard to try to talk to the ghosts that had been cleaning up her room, but they find out that the reason that the ghost had been returning to Frida's house, an antique book that the ghost had previously owned, had disappeared. Frida's sense of identity, which had previously revolved around her supposed organization skills, is challenged, and she lashes out at David and Hilda, straining their friendship.
10	10	"Chapter 10: The Storm"	Luke Pearson	September 21, 2018
Hilda is stuck at home during a major storm while struggling to cope after her fallout with Frida. To try to get the storm to stop, Hilda, David, and Raven visit the local weather woman and discover that Hilda's favorite weatherwoman has stolen a weather spirit's baby for the purposes of manipulating the weather. Hilda is luckily able to bring it back to its parents, but ends up getting lost in the wilderness soon afterwards on her way back home.
11	11	"Chapter 11: The House in the Woods"	Ben Joseph	September 21, 2018
Hilda wanders the wilderness trying to find help. Meanwhile, Johanna worries about her at home. While she is in the forest, Hilda meets up with the Wood Man again and they both hide in a log cabin after almost getting eaten by a giant. They soon discover that this log cabin can grant any wish they want, but they are not able to leave it. Eventually Hilda wishes to go home, and ends up going back to her house through a door in the cabin.
12	12	"Chapter 12: The Nisse"	Luke Pearson	September 21, 2018
Hilda tries to help a nisse named Tontu, who has been kicked out of his house because the owner of it claims that he destroyed it. She invites him back to her house, only for Tontu to be attacked by a nisse who is already living there and be forced to run away. Later, Hilda goes on a camping trip with the rest of the Sparrow Scouts, and finds Tontu in the forest. However, a monster called the Black Hound is spotted in the forest, which causes the trip to be cut short. Hilda, worried about Tontu, decides to travel back into the woods. She finds out that Frida's new friends are Marras, trying to turn Frida into a Marra too. David stands up to them, only to be interrupted by the Black Hound.
13	13	"Chapter 13: The Black Hound"	Stephanie Simpson	September 21, 2018
Hilda and her friends manage to escape from the Black Hound, but Hilda is still worried about Tontu. She asks around the city, only to find that many other nisse have been mysteriously expelled from their home. On the way to the Sparrow Scouts badge ceremony, she finally finds Tontu safe and sound, who decides to explore the Nowhere Space inside the scout hall. During the ceremony, the Black Hound comes out of Nowhere Space and Hilda and Tontu flee, ending up in Hilda's home. Her house's nisse appears to defend its territory, only to realize that the hound was actually its pet, Jellybean. Hilda also figures out that it was actually Jellybean that had been messing up everyone's houses by travelling through Nowhere Space. After finding out that Jelly Bean is innocent, Hilda, Johanna, and the two nisses must run from Trolberg's safety patrol. While driving, the group is separated while using Nowhere Space to warp out of the city, sending Jellybean and his owner into the wilderness. Hilda and Johanna return home, with Tontu taking up residence there as well. Adapted from Hilda and the Black Hound

=== Season 2 (2020) ===
No. overall	No. in season	Title	Written by	Original release date
14	1	"Chapter 1: The Troll Circle"	Stephanie Simpson	December 14, 2020
Hilda wins an essay contest by writing about her first-hand encounter with a Troll (101 'Hidden People'). The prize: a day out of school for a 'ride along' inspection of Trolberg's defenses with the head of the Safety Patrol, Erik Ahlberg. He's a direct descendent of historic "Trollslayer" Edmund Ahlberg, but has never encountered a Troll himself. The tour takes them outside the wall... and right into the middle of a "Mexican standoff" with a whole group of Trolls, including a monstrous Two-Headed Troll. Hilda gets them out unscathed, but not before this chip off the Alhberg family block reveals his true intentions – he is preparing Trolberg for a full-on conflict with the Trolls.
15	2	"Chapter 2: The Draugen"	Ben Joseph	December 14, 2020
Hilda seeks out the Rat King, keeper of all secrets, for dirt on Erik Ahlberg. On the way, she stumbles into the Wood Man and joins him on a nautical journey to find a fabled Ghost Ship crewed by the spirits of lost sailors – the 'Draugen'. They find the Draugen very welcoming... too welcoming in fact – they want to recruit Hilda and the Wood Man into their ghostly ranks! To escape that fate, Hilda and the Wood Man agree to a gamble with the ghosts – beat them in a boat race to the shore, or lose and become Draugen themselves. They race the Ghost Ship to shore... but the Ghost Ship doesn't stop there. The race continues on land to a ghostly show-down at the Trolberg cemetery, and another run-in with Erik Ahlberg.
16	3	"Chapter 3: The Witch"	Stephanie Simpson & Luke Pearson	December 14, 2020
At the library, Hilda and Frida 'accidentally' trail the Librarian through a secret passage and are transported to the Witches' Tower – an age-old sanctuary where regional witches practice the art of magic. The Librarian enlists them to help with a long-neglected project: tracking down the missing volume of an important magical reference anthology. In a climactic encounter with the ancient and powerful (and familiar!) witch who is in possession of the missing volume, Frida's witch-like talents (organization, research) shine. By the end of this adventure, Frida has become a true witches' apprentice.
17	4	"Chapter 4: The Eternal Warriors"	Kenny Byerly	December 14, 2020
David stumbles into an enchanted Viking battle, where immortal warriors are locked in combat night after night. He gets conscripted as a battlefield messenger and returns to camp by morning possessed by the spirit of a Viking warrior. (This is based on elements from the Scandinavian folktale "The Boy Who Knew No Fear".) Hilda and Frida discover that David must return to the battlefield and engage in ferocious and funny Viking combat in order to reverse his transformation and become himself again. With the help of his friends, David fearlessly reclaims his fearfulness.
18	5	"Chapter 5: The Windmill"	Luke Pearson	December 14, 2020
Victoria Van Gale has turned over a new leaf after the destruction of her Weather Station (110 'Storm') – she's moved to Trolberg and has set up a sanctuary for displaced wildlife in an abandoned windmill. Hilda and Frida pitch in to help but David remains deeply suspicious, a rift that tests their friendship. David is right – the windmill is a front for a dangerous experiment that will allow Van Gale to exploit Nowhere Space. Hilda, David, and Frida must band together to keep her from causing a catastrophic rip in Nowhere Space. Song: "This is Nowhere" by Orville Peck
19	6	"Chapter 6: The Old Bells of Trolberg"	Bryan Korn & Gabe Pulliam	December 14, 2020
The Safety Patrol has rigged Trolberg's bell system to ring automatically, and the constant ringing is throwing Trolberg's natural (and supernatural) world into chaos. Hilda recruits a motley team of friends – human and creature – and leads an "Ocean's Eleven"-style sabotage operation against the system of bells. Against the backdrop of the festive activation ceremony, Hilda and co. disable the system with the help of an unlikely ally – the 'Bellkeeper' who mans the bell towers.
20	7	"Chapter 7: The Beast of Cauldron Island"	Tim McKeon	December 14, 2020
Boats are being sunk in the Trolberg Harbor, including the Wood Man's. Safety Patrol head Ahlberg blames the fire-breathing Lindworm (Season 1), and leads a strike force to Cauldron Island to defeat her. Hilda and Frida dive down into the Harbor to discover the real sea monster: an island-sized 'Kraken' with a taste for wooden ships. They work together, with Frida using her witch-in-training powers, to divert the Kraken, save the harbor, and clear the Lindworm.
21	8	"Chapter 8: The Fifty Year Night"	Kenny Byerly	December 14, 2020
Hilda's curfew-breaking and deceit have caught up to her, and she's stuck home grounded. Snooping on a mysterious neighbor, she discovers a portal to Trolberg past, circa 50-years ago, where the Neighbor has been obsessively revisiting a romantic 'missed connection'. Hilda meddles with the past to change the future, triggering a disruption in time and the appearance of a paradox-hungry Time Worm. It's a wild journey through time and space!
22	9	"Chapter 9: The Deerfox"	Luke Pearson	December 14, 2020
Twig feels left out by Hilda. One night he sees lights in the sky and runs away through the gates of Trolberg. On his way to the lights he is chased by a wolf-like creature. Hilda and Johanna track Twig down through the wilderness, flashing back to memories of Hilda and Twig's first encounter; when Twig was trapped under a pile of stones and Hilda helped him get out. Hilda and Johanna reach a cliff and another flashback shows Twig saving Hilda from falling off the cliff. When Hilda and Johanna start ascent, Hilda is attacked by the wolf-like creature. The situation seems hopeless, but Twig comes to save Hilda; the creature falls off the cliff. The lights in the sky appear to be formed by light trails used by deerfoxes. Twig meets his parents who prompt him to join them. Hilda tells Twig that she understands his decision to join other deerfoxes. When Twig starts his journey on a light trail to the sky he experiences a flashback that in the past he chose to save Hilda from falling off the cliff but he had to part with other deerfoxes. A heartbroken Hilda tells Johanna that she has lost her way of life, her home, and now Twig. Twig promptly returns, having decided to stay with Hilda. Hilda promises that she will never leave Twig out again.
23	10	"Chapter 10: The Yule Lads"	Todd Casey	December 14, 2020
At Trolberg's 'Winter Festival', Hilda encounters a group of strange little men called 'Yule Lads' who are looking for naughty children. They're funny and fun to have around, but Hilda realizes too late that they are servants of the Gryla; a legendary monster that eats misbehaving children. With the hungry Gryla fast approaching, Hilda and the Yule Lads must work together to cook up an alternative (vegetarian) holiday feast for it to eat. Guest star: Andy Serkis as Kertasnikir.
24	11	"Chapter 11: The Jorts Incident"	Emily Brundige	December 14, 2020
The magical Tide Mice (108 'Tide Mice') enchant a local snack machine stocker, Gil, with supernatural luck, propelling a meteoric rise from stock-boy to CEO of the 'Jorts' snackfood empire. With all of Trolberg gone magically jorts-crazy, Hilda and team must undo the Tide Mice enchantment once again by infiltrating Jorts HQ and capturing the quickly multiplying Tide Mice. It's a magical, Ghostbusters-style chase through the office tower to the top floor for the final disenchantment.
25	12	"Chapter 12: The Replacement"	Todd Casey	December 14, 2020
Alfur has been ignoring requests for him to return to the Elf Kingdom – his reports of his Trolberg adventures are so spectacular that the powers that be refuse to believe they are true, and he's been called to answer for his crimes against paperwork. When his replacement, a joyless elf named Alvin, shows up suddenly to take his place with Hilda, along with a delegation of elves, Alfur enlists the Lost Clan to try and orchestrate a switcheroo by sending a disguised elven warrior back in his stead. The plan fails and Alfur becomes an Elf on the run.
26	13	"Chapter 13: The Stone Forest"	Stephanie Simpson	December 14, 2020
Johanna catches Hilda trying to slip past her curfew using Nowhere Space, but their struggle tears open a rift that pulls them into the mysterious Stone Forest. As they search for a way out while avoiding trolls, David and Frida leave Trolberg to look for Hilda. Their paths cross with Ahlberg and Gerda after a spectacular dirigible crash, and the group sets up camp at the base of a mountain. While Hilda and Johanna remain stranded in the Stone Forest, David and Frida are stranded on the mountain—closer to each other than they realize. After finally escaping the Stone Forest, Hilda and Johanna discover that Twig has been captured by the fearsome Two-Headed Troll. They stage a daring rescue, sparking a massive brawl among the trolls. Fleeing the chaos, they find shelter with a kind Mum and Child troll, who use Troll Magic to guide them toward safety. Meanwhile, Frida, David, and Gerda endure a night on Troll Mountain and construct a makeshift floating life raft. But Hilda and Johanna's path takes a terrifying turn when the furious Two-Headed Troll corners them. At the last moment, Alfur swoops in on pigeon-back, leading them in a desperate aerial escape from the mountain. Back home at last, Johanna tucks Hilda into bed for some much-needed rest. But the next morning, when Johanna brings her breakfast in bed, she makes a shocking discovery—Hilda is gone. In her place, a Troll child peeks out from beneath the covers. Adapted from Hilda and the Stone Forest

=== Film (2021) ===
Title	Written by	Original release date
"Hilda and the Mountain King"	Luke Pearson	December 30, 2021
Hilda has found herself stranded in troll country, trapped in the body of a troll. She sets out on a quest to regain her human form and reunite with her mum, Johanna. Along the way, other trolls introduce her to their customs, cuisine, and legends—most notably the infamous Mountain King. Meanwhile, as tensions mount between the gathering trolls and the city of Trolberg, Johanna, along with Baba, the troll child who took over Hilda's place as a human, searches the mountainside, desperate to find her daughter before the conflict erupts into a full-blown war. Adapted from Hilda and the Mountain King

=== Season 3 (2023) ===
No. overall	No. in season	Title	Directed by	Written by	Original release date
27	1	"Chapter 1: The Train to Tofoten"	Andy Coyle	Luke Pearson	December 7, 2023
Hilda receives a letter from her great aunt Astrid inviting her to visit Tofoten. Together with Johanna, Frida, David, Alfur, Tontu, and Twig, she travels by train to Tofoten, where Astrid meets them and accommodates in her house. Astrid reveals that she creates protective charms and gives Hilda, Frida and David each a charm. Hilda is bored in Tofoten. Pooka, a shape-shifter, knocks on the door of the house and asks to borrow an egg cup and a spoon. Astrid wants to see what Pooka has in his bag, and an egg of a Woff drops out. Astrid says that the egg needs to be returned to the Woff cave nearby and the group sets off. Just after they return the egg, it hatches and the little Woff joins the others, but the Woffs destroy the pathway in the process. Joanna says that everyone should just jump and each of them is picked up by Woffs and they fly home. Before going to sleep, Hilda takes a book from the shelf called "Fairies of Tofoten" and begins to read.
28	2	"Chapter 2: The Fairy Mound"	Andy Coyle	Luke Pearson	December 7, 2023
Convinced that fairies exist in Tofoten, Hilda questions the town about fairies, only to receive conflicting answers. During a camping trip, Hilda witnesses Astrid visit a hill in secret. Theorizing it was a fairy mound, she, Frida, and David visit the mound the following day. Hilda removes one of the charms surrounding the mound and David subsequently disappears into it. The two search and eventually find him, but they become lost and surrounded by mushroom creatures. Hilda witnesses two cloaked figures before she is rescued by Astrid and Johanna, who had dug her and her friends out. Astrid explains that the group had wandered into Fairy Country, their charms preventing them from becoming lost even further. Furious that a fairy mound still exists in Tofoten, Johanna and the others return home the next day.
29	3	"Chapter 3: The Giantslayer"	Andy Coyle	Ben Greene	December 7, 2023
After having a nightmare of Fairy Country, Hilda accidentally breaks her charm. At the suggestion of Astrid, she goes to the Faratok Tree to make her own charm and encounters the Wood Man, who was maintaining the tree. Twig chases a squirrel into a hole in the tree, and Hilda and the Wood Man follow, emerging into a different timeline near an old village. The villagers are terrified of giants, who unknowingly destroy their homes, and are guarded Halvor, a young boy who the villagers call the Giant Slayer. Though he has yet to slay a giant, Halvor had captured a giant and plans to use him as a trap to lure other giants. Hoping to bring peace between humans and giants, Hilda tries to free the giant but is accidentally knocked out by it. Upon waking, she witnesses a battle between the giant's sister and the humans. Hilda returns to see the Wood Man captured, the villagers believing him to be a demon. While trying to free the Wood Man, she fights Halvor, and the two inadvertently set the town and the Faratok Tree on fire. Witnessing the damage he caused, Halvor has a change of heart and frees the giant, who helps put out the town fire. Nevertheless, all the giants leave, and Hilda and the Wood Man return to their own timeline right before the Faratok Tree burns down completely. The Wood Man consoles Hilda by mentioning how her actions will make a difference in the other timeline and allows her to take a piece of the tree to make a new charm.
30	4	"Chapter 4: The Laughing Merman"	Megan Ferguson	Ben Joseph & Che Grayson	December 7, 2023
During a trip with the Sparrow Scouts, Hilda and her friends are unable to find a fourth group member, as the scouts are wary of them due to their tendencies to encounter weird events. The scout leader assigns them an introverted girl named Louise. Hoping to not frighten her away, Hilda and her friends try their best to make their trip as normal as possible, but are eventually lost in the river after David loses the map. The group encounters a merman named Eugene, who uses illusions and tricks to eventually trap the group in a cave, hoping to keep them as his audience forever. David bargains with Eugene to let them free, but all of them aside from Louise fail to Eugene's trickery. Louise convinces Eugene to give them another chance, and reveals to the group that she had figured out how to see through Eugene's illusions, which allows the group to escape. Louise reveals she took David's map, hoping to have a fun adventure with the group, and guides Eugene back to the ocean, where he was taken from, but not before asking him to scare the scouts that had previously insulted Hilda and her friends.
31	5	"Chapter 5: The Job"	Megan Ferguson	Stephanie Simpson	December 7, 2023
Hilda's father, Anders, returns to Trolberg to Hilda's joy, and takes her and her friends out for lunch. Though Johanna asks them to return around five, Hilda and Anders eventually become sidetracked by the Polecat, who sends Anders to retrieve a package in a ruined castle beyond Trolberg. Using Hilda's knowledge of the wilderness, Hilda, Anders, and Twig use the Polecat's car to travel to the castle via a shortcut, bonding along the way. Upon arriving, they learn that the Polecat had previously sent his associates to rob a chest that belongs to a troll. Having gone past their agreed return time, Johanna tracks them to the ruined castle, which is subsequently attacked by the troll. Anders distracts the troll to save Hilda but gets cornered. He mysteriously disappears and the associates escape; believing the associates to be Anders leaving, Johanna consoles Hilda for feeling abandoned.
32	6	"Chapter 6: The Forgotten Lake"	Andy Coyle	Stephanie Simpson	December 7, 2023
Hilda remains despondent about Anders' perceived departure and believes Johanna is too overprotective of her. In response, Johanna buys a new car and they and Twig go on a camping trip, eventually choosing to camp at a place near a lake. At night, Johanna plays a pan pipe that Hilda had bought in Tofoten, inadvertently waking up an ancient entity in the lake. The following day, they arrive at the lake, which Johanna vaguely recognizes from her artwork. While exploring, Hilda removes a fishing net with charms, releasing the entity - a Spider Frog - which kidnaps Hilda, planning on eating her and Johanna. Twig subsequently becomes trapped in the silk while trying to rescue Hilda. Johanna frees the two using a hand saw, and they are chased by the entity back to the car. Johanna uses the charms from the fishing net to temporarily trap the Spider Frog, but it eventually catches up and eats Johanna and Hilda, but finds them disgusting and spits them out. The entity recognizes Johanna, having tried to eat her when she was young before being imprisoned by Johanna's parents. Johanna fails to recall those memories.
33	7	"Chapter 7: Strange Frequencies"	Megan Ferguson	Emily Brundige	December 7, 2023
Cryptic messages play on Hilda's radio, and, believing it to be from Anders, she spends days trying to decode it. Meanwhile, Frida learns that the nisse have begun stealing from each other, and plans a town meeting to address the issue. With the help of David and Hilda, whose radio was stolen by Tontu, then a different nisse, they set up a meeting with all of the nisse, only for the meeting to descend into a fight after Hilda takes back her stolen radio. The cryptic messages eventually clear up, revealing it to be from van Gale; Hilda finally accepts that Anders had abandoned her, and gives her radio to Tontu. Tontu is surprised at someone willingly giving him something, leading Hilda to come up with a solution to the nisse infighting. Hilda and her friends create a lending library, where the nisse can borrow items as long as they return it. They return to Hilda's room, where Tontu reveals that Anders was in fact trying to contact Hilda via van Gale's broadcasts. Using elf radios in various locations, Alfur reveals that the broadcast originate from Tofoten. Believing that Anders was somehow taken into Fairy Country, Hilda, Twig, and her friends leave for Tofoten without telling Johanna, but Johanna learns about their plans from Alfur.
34	8	"Chapter 8: The Fairy Isle"	Andy Coyle	Luke Pearson	December 7, 2023
Arriving at the fairy mound, Hilda and Twig travel into Fairy Country, instructing Frida and David to dig them and Anders out of the mound. Hilda travels across a lake and eventually reunites with her father. They return to van Gale's shelter, which surrounds a tower. Anders is discovered by the mushroom creatures, and tries to escape with Hilda and Twig across the lake back to where Hilda entered Fairy Country, with van Gale choosing to remain in order to study her new home. Fairy Country tries to prevent them from escaping; upon losing contact with Hilda, Frida uses magic to create a portal and David pulls them out. However, Frida reveals that Johanna had followed Hilda into the mound, prompting Hilda to return through the portal by herself. Frida is knocked out and the mound collapses. Twig and Anders continue to search for Hilda as David takes care of Frida at Astrid's house; Astrid sets off to Fairy Country. Hilda arrives at the heart of Fairy Country, the Fairy Isle, and stumbles upon a young girl who was lost and abandoned by her parents. The two travel across the land and eventually discover a woman watching over the young girl as she sleeps. Astrid finds Hilda and tells her to stop pursuing the woman, but Hilda chases after her into a cave with a house similar to Hilda's former home. The cloaked figures leave the house and reveal themselves as Johanna's parents, Phinium and Lydia, and the young girl transforms into Johanna. Phinium explains that he and his sister, Astrid, were fairies who frequently traveled to the human world to play, and eventually became close friends with Lydia. Phinium and Lydia later fell in love and conceived Johanna, but as traveling between their worlds became more difficult, Phinium chose to stay with Lydia in the human world, eventually convincing Astrid to do the same. However, Johanna fell sick, prompting Phinium and Lydia to seek help from the Fairy Isle; the Isle cured Johanna, on the condition that Johanna was to be given to them after she turned ten. Phinium and Lydia later made a second bargain to trade themselves in Johanna's place, forcing them to abandon Johanna and have Astrid erase Johanna's memories. Astrid undoes the spell, leading Johanna to remember all her memories. However, Johanna and Hilda are unable to leave Fairy Isle, as Johanna's presence in the Fairy Isle meant that the first bargain was now upheld. To console Hilda, Johanna's parents show them the watchtower, which they used to observe the real world and rescue Anders from the troll, though it cannot be used to return to the real world. A path emerges from the sky - in the human world, Twig and Frida had summoned Twig's deerfox herd, who could travel between the two worlds due to being magical creatures. Hilda and Johanna run for the path and the deerfoxes battle the Fairy Isle's creatures, while Astrid tries to set up another bargain to free Johanna. With the help of Johanna's parents, Hilda, Johanna, and the deerfoxes successfully return to the human world. Johanna's sickness briefly returns but she quickly recovers, coming to believe that Astrid had chosen to bargain her life. However, Astrid was revealed to be alive, having been stopped from her life bargain by van Gale, who witnessed the watchtower's contact with the real world and offered her own bargain. Astrid was subsequently banished from Fairy Country. Hilda, her family, and her friends return to Trolberg as Anders settles down in a new apartment. They all watch the Bird Parade as the Great Raven returns. Guest Star: Shirley Henderson as the Fairy Entity

== Production ==
=== Conception ===
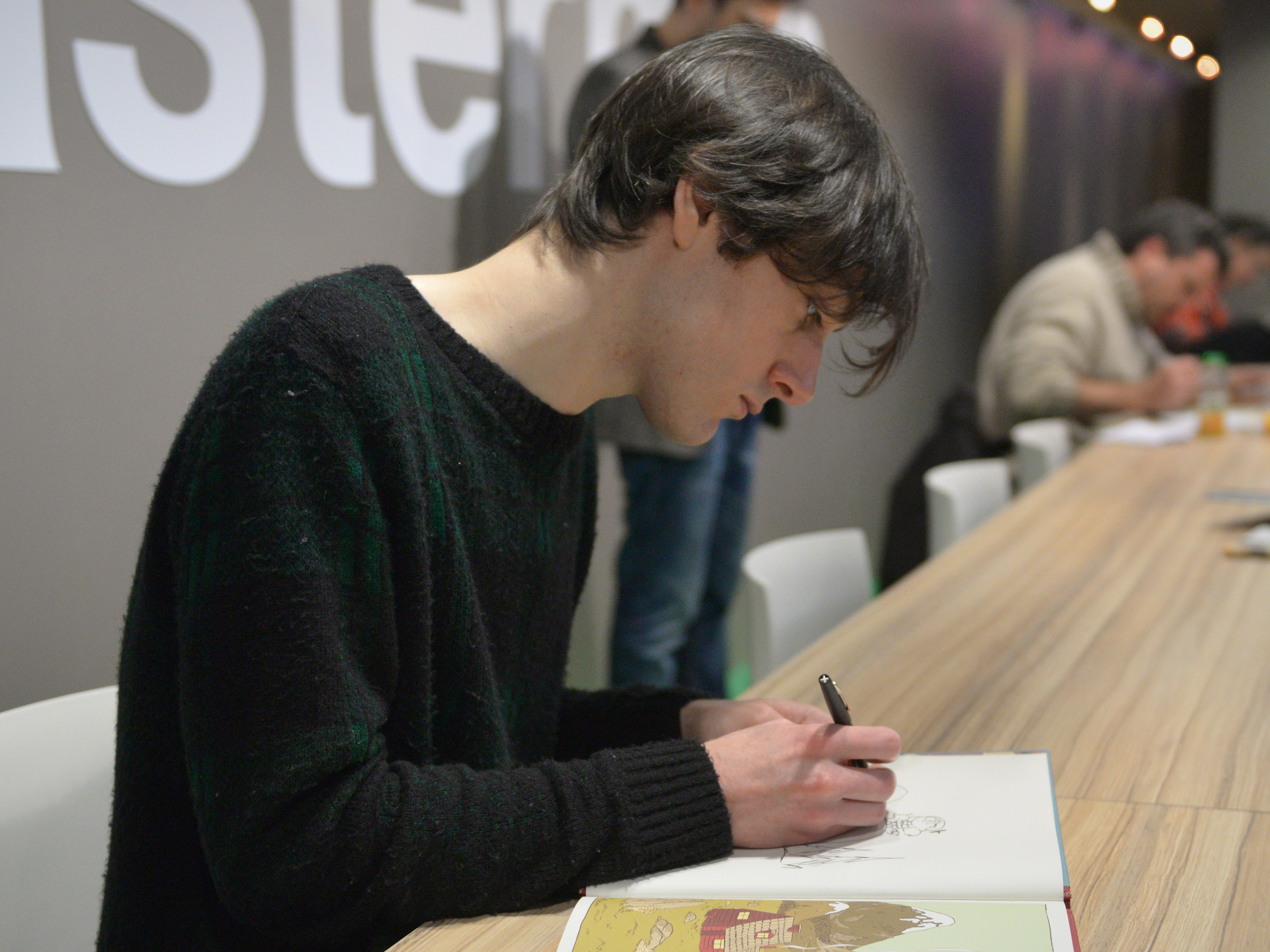
Luke Pearson at the 2015 Angoulême Festival.

Luke Pearson had previously worked in the animation industry, serving as a storyboard artist on several Adventure Time episodes. Early on in the Hilda series, he never seriously considered an animated adaptation of the books, though he did have a few thoughts about how the character could work in animation even before he worked on the first comic.

Before Silvergate entered the picture, a handful of production companies had expressed interest in adapting Hilda, but none of their proposals felt right. To Luke Pearson, those early ideas seemed to miss the heart of the series—preserving only its outer shell while altering its core spirit.

In 2014, Silvergate producer Kurt Mueller came across Hildafolk, the first book in the series, at an independent bookstore in Brooklyn, New York. Captivated, the team at Silvergate quickly became interested in bringing Hilda to television.

Later that year, Pearson received Silvergate's proposal in the mail. The pitch was designed with a playful authenticity: styled as a book from Hilda's satchel in Hilda and the Bird Parade, complete with a Trollberg library card, a tiny elf letter, and a wooden USB stick containing the actual series outline. By then, three Hilda books had been published, with the fourth—Hilda and the Black Hound—in progress. Pearson found the proposal charming and true to the world he had created, sparking the beginning of his collaboration with Silvergate.

When Pearson and Silvergate started working together on a pitch, they wanted to build upon the original books while simultaneously keeping the general feel that the series had. Luke was specifically concerned in making sure the show did not feel "too TV and formulaic."

=== Pitch ===
With help from head writer Stephanie Simpson, Luke and Silvergate created a pitch bible that would be used to pitch the show to various broadcasters. Some elements from the books were expanded upon to help fill out the show. For example, the characters of David and Frida were originally minor characters that appeared in The Black Hound. Simpson specifically picked those characters out and expanded on them so they could fill out roles as Hilda's friends. Netflix eventually picked up and greenlit the series in 2016.

=== Announcement ===
Development of the series was first briefly mentioned on June 15, 2016, in The New Yorker, stating that Netflix was planning a "twelve-episode animated series, based on the first four books, for early 2018." On June 21, 2016, Luke Pearson and Sam Arthur (co-founder of Nobrow Press) announced on Nobrow Press' official blog that Silvergate Media would also partake in the series' production, with Pearson saying:

I'm obviously very excited to be able to finally say this is happening. Alongside drawing a new book I've been working with Silvergate on this for a while now and can confirm that it's in unbelievably good hands. An inordinate amount of love and attention to detail is going into this thing and I'm looking forward to sharing the result in a couple of years' time.

=== Animation ===
Mercury Filmworks, a Canadian animation studio known for working on various animated Disney television shows, came on board early in development. A minute-and a half animation test was created to figure out how the show would move and look. There were various experiments with the show's design and art style to see what would work best for the adaptation. Additional animation was provided by Atomic Cartoons, who helped animate 8 episodes from the first season.

=== Design ===
When it came to designing background characters for the show, Luke would usually create preliminary sketches for a character, and it would then be translated into a finished design by Mercury. Some characters were given dot eyes as to help make characters like David better blend in to the style of the show.

The creatures in the show, as well as the book series, are heavily based on Scandinavian folklore. One of the biggest inspirations used for the show was Scandinavian Folk-Lore: Illustrations of the Traditional Beliefs of the Northern Peoples, written by William Alexander Craigie. Many creatures in the show were taken directly from these tales.

=== Music ===
Bella Ramsey wrote and sang "The Life of Hilda" for the second season.

== Release ==
The first two episodes of season one premiered at the New York International Children's Film Festival on February 25, 2018. The first and third episode of season two premiered at the NYICFF on February 22, 2020. The first two episodes of the third and final season premiered at the Ottawa International Animation Festival on September 21, 2023, the series' fifth anniversary.

The first season was released on Netflix on September 21, 2018. The second season was released on December 14, 2020. The third and final season premiered on December 7, 2023.

== Reception ==
=== Critical response ===
Hilda has received critical acclaim from critics and fans of the Hilda books, praising its writing, characters, animation, and vocal performances. On review aggregator Rotten Tomatoes, season 1 has received a 100% fresh rating based on 10 reviews with an average rating of 9.00/10. The website's critic consensus reads, "Animated magic of the highest order, Hilda successfully captures complex feelings and charming characters into an enchanting adventure that is suited for children and adults alike". Emily Ashby of Common Sense Media gave the series four out of five stars, stating that Hilda, herself, "is the show's best quality, but it also benefits from curious characters, exceptionally matched storytelling and Toonboom animation, and an endearing world of fantasy". Emily St. James of Vox says Bella Ramsey "gives Hilda a stubborn quality that is in turns endearing and sweetly cringe-inducing." Entertainment Weekly ranked this series Netflix's 23rd best original series of all time.

Allison Keene of Collider gave the series a four out of five stars, saying: "Regardless of age, Hilda invites viewers to join in the mystery and thrill of adventure and to find the magic in the introduction of these many creatures, and some of their curious habits, in an upbeat and wonderful world. Though Hilda must grow up and accept city life, she need not put aside her childlike wonder. Neither should we." Others focused on the character known as "The Librarian," (later named Kaisa) arguing that her character is "among the most positive pop culture depictions of librarians, along with fellow animated shows Cleopatra in Space and She-Ra and the Princesses of Power." The same reviewer states that the nine minutes in the first season within a library setting makes a "strong impression," including an episode featuring a special collections room, and arguing that the series makes clear the "importance of librarians and libraries for years to come."

=== Awards and nominations ===
Year	Award	Category	Nominee(s)	Result	Ref
2019	46th Annie Awards	Best Animated Television/Broadcast Production For Children	Hilda	Won	
2019	46th Annie Awards	Outstanding Achievement for Character Animation in an Animated Television/Broadcast Production	Scott Lewis	Won	
2019	46th Annie Awards	Outstanding Achievement for Writing in an Animated Television/Broadcast Production	Stephanie Simpson	Won	
2019	78th Annual Peabody Awards	Child and Youth Programming	Hilda	Nominated	
2019	Daytime Emmy Awards	Outstanding Children's Animated Series	Clint Eland, Kurt Mueller, Luke Pearson, Stephanie Simpson, Adam Idelson, Chantal Ling, Rachel Simon, and Andrew Hymas	Nominated	
2019	Daytime Emmy Awards	Outstanding Writing for an Animated Program	Stephanie Simpson and Kenny Byerly	Nominated	
2019	Daytime Emmy Awards	Outstanding Directing for an Animated Program	Andy Coyle and Megan Ferguson	Nominated	
2019	Daytime Emmy Awards	Outstanding Main Title and Graphic Design for an Animated Program	Hilda	Won	
2019	2019 BAFTA Children's Awards	Animation	Luke Pearson, Stephanie Simpson, Kurt Mueller, and Bella Ramsey	Won	
2020	2020 Kidscreen Awards	Best Animated Series	Hilda	Won	
2020	British Animation Awards	Best Voice Performance	Bella Ramsey	Nominated	
2021	48th Annie Awards	Best Animated Television / Broadcast Production for Children	Hilda (for "Chapter 9: The Deerfox")	Won	
2021	48th Annie Awards	Outstanding Achievement for Character Animation in an Animated Television / Broadcast Production	David Laliberté	Won	
2021	48th Annie Awards	Outstanding Achievement for Editorial in an Animated Television / Broadcast Production	John McKinnon (for "Chapter 9: The Deerfox")	Won	
2021	Daytime Emmy Awards	Outstanding Children's Animated Series	Kurt Mueller, Luke Pearson, Stephanie Simpson, Bryan Korn, Chantal Ling, Rachel Simon, Emerald Wright-Collie, Steve Jacobson, and Victor Reyes	Won	
2021	Daytime Emmy Awards	Outstanding Writing for an Animated Program	Stephanie Simpson and Luke Pearson	Nominated	
2021	Daytime Emmy Awards	Outstanding Directing for an Animated Program	Andy Coyle	Nominated	
2021	Daytime Emmy Awards	Outstanding Voice Directing for a Daytime Animated Series	David Peacock	Nominated	
2021	Daytime Emmy Awards	Outstanding Editing for a Daytime Animated Program	John McKinnon (shared with Animaniacs)	Won	
2022	British Academy Children's Awards 2022	Animation	Hilda	Nominated	
2024	51st Annie Awards	Best Animated Television / Broadcast Production for Children	Hilda (for "Chapter 8: The Fairy Isle")	Won	
2024	51st Annie Awards	Outstanding Achievement for Editorial in an Animated Television / Broadcast Production	John Mckinnon and Mike Stefanelli	Nominated	
2025	3rd Children's and Family Emmy Awards	Outstanding Children's or Young Teen Animated Series	Hilda	Nominated	
2025	3rd Children's and Family Emmy Awards	Outstanding Writing for an Animated Program	Luke Pearson, Stephanie Simpson and Emily Brundige (for "The Fairy Isle")	Nominated	
2025	3rd Children's and Family Emmy Awards	Outstanding Directing for an Animated Series	Andy Coyle (for "The Fairy Isle")	Nominated	
2025	3rd Children's and Family Emmy Awards	Outstanding Editing for an Animated Program	Ian McBain, Micheal D. Stefanelli and John McKinnon	Nominated	
2025	3rd Children's and Family Emmy Awards	Outstanding Show Open	Andy Coyle, Christopher Goettler, Grace Roe, Jean-Luc Sauve, Katrina Jofre, Larissa Gagnier, Ryan Hobbs, Sara Connelly, Scott Lewis, Shamisa Schroeder, Vanessa Rowett, David Badour, Gillian Reid-Timms, John McKinnon, Ross Love, Phil Lanoix and Ryan Carlson	Nominated	

== Tie-in material ==
=== Feature film ===
An 82-minute movie based on Hilda and the Mountain King entered production in 2019, and was released on December 30, 2021.

=== Mobile game ===
A mobile game based on the series titled Hilda Creatures was released on the App Store on October 18, 2018. The game was developed by British developer BIGUMAKU. An Android version was released on December 6, 2018.

=== Novelizations ===
Hilda and the Hidden People, a novel based on the first two episodes of the series, was released on September 4, 2018. The book was authored by Stephen Davies and illustrated by Seaerra Miller. Two more books based on the first season were released, titled Hilda and the Great Parade and Hilda and the Nowhere Space. They were respectively released on January 22 and May 21, 2019. Both were also penned by Davies and Miller.

Three more novels based on the series, specifically the second season, titled Hilda and the Time Worm, Hilda and the Ghost Ship, and Hilda and the White Woff were all released on November 17, 2020. The books were once again written by Davies, and all three were illustrated by Victoria Evans.

=== Soundtrack albums ===
Two soundtrack albums compiling music from the first two seasons were released through digital platforms by Madison Gate Records on July 28, 2023. A soundtrack album for the third season was later released on December 15, 2023.
