= Scream Street (TV series) =

- Genre: Children's; Comedy horror Stop motion animation
- Created by: Tommy Donbavand
- Based on: Scream Street by Tommy Donbavand
- Written by: Ben Ward; Giles Pilbrow; Mark Huckerby; Nick Ostler; Tony Cooke; Dan Gaster; Reid Harrison; Tommy Donbavand; Jason Hazeley; Joel Morris; Georgia Pritchett
- Directed by: Geoff Walker
- Voices of: Tyger Drew-Honey; Rasmus Hardiker; Tala Gouveia; Claire Skinner; Jim Howick; Debra Stephenson; John Thomson
- Opening theme: "Scream Street" performed by Rasmus Hardiker; Composed by Joseph Rowe
- Ending theme: "Scream Street" (instrumental)
- Composer: Gareth Davies
- Countries of origin: United Kingdom; Germany
- Original language: English
- No. of seasons: 3
- No. of episodes: 52

Production
- Executive producers: Zoe Bamsey; Helen McAleer; Katharina Pietzsch; Lucy Pryke; Giles Pilbrow
- Producer: Phil Chalk
- Cinematography: Martin Kelly
- Running time: 11 minutes
- Production companies: Factory; Coolabi Productions; ZDF Enterprises; Ingenious Media

Original release
- Network: CBBC
- Release: 21 October 2015 – 2020

Scream Street is a stop motion animated comedy-horror television series, airing on the CBBC channel in the United Kingdom. It is a co-production between Factory, Coolabi Productions, ZDF Enterprises and Ingenious Media based on the books of the same name by Tommy Donbavand.

A second season was confirmed in 2020.

== Plot ==
The series focuses on Luke Watson, a young boy who used to live a normal life with his parents. But after he starts turning into a werewolf, Luke and his parents are relocated to Scream Street, a town inhabited by monsters. Luke befriends two other residents of Scream Street, a vampire named Resus Negative and a mummy named Cleo Farr

== Cast ==
=== Main trio ===
- Luke Watson (voiced by Tyger Drew-Honey), an adventurous teenage boy, who has just discovered himself to be an unstable werewolf whenever he gets angry.
- Resus Negative (voiced by Rasmus Hardiker), a sarcastic yet funny, "rockstar vampire", who does not have fangs, cannot change into a bat, and drinks tomato juice instead of blood.
- Cleo Farr (voiced by Tala Gouveia), a 4,000-year-old mummy, who befriends Luke and Resus, despite knowing that they are going to grow older without her.

=== Other residents ===
- Luella Everwell (voiced by Claire Skinner), Eefa's niece and Resus' admirer.
- Doug (voiced by Rasmus Hardiker), an undead teenager who talks like a surfer.
- Six (voiced by Claire Skinner), a monster stitched together by Dr F who does not know much about anything.
- Dig, a reanimated dog whose lower torso is all bone.
- Lulu, Resus' large pet leech.
- Sue Watson (voiced by Claire Skinner), Luke's mother, who tries her best to keep her family in check.
- Mike Watson (voiced by Jim Howick), Luke's father, an overly sensitive man who has yet to get used to life on Scream Street.
- Bella Negative (voiced by Debra Stephenson), Resus' mother.
- Alston Negative (voiced by John Thomson), Resus' father.
- Niles Farr (voiced by John Thomson), Cleo's embarrassing father.
- Eefa Everwell (voiced by Debra Stephenson), the local witch and Luella's aunt.
- Dr Skully (voiced by John Thomson), the skeletal teacher of Scream Street.
- Dr F (voiced by Debra Stephenson), a wicked mad scientist who is Six's mother (who she reminds as her "creator").
- Mayor Sir Otto Sneer (voiced by John Thomson), the sniveling and conniving mayor of Scream Street.
- Dixon (voiced by John Thomson), Otto's shapeshifting apprentice and nephew.
- Noname, Otto's faceless bodyguard.
- President McDread (voiced by John Thomson), the leader of the monster community.

== Episodes ==
=== Season 1 (2015–17) ===
No.	Title	Original release date
1	"Spring Clean"	21 October 2015
Luke's love for cutting corners gets him into serious trouble when a quick-fix solution to tidying his room puts the whole of Scream Street in danger.
2	"Haunted House"	28 October 2015
Luke is curious when a new house appears in Scream Street, but then it comes alive and locks him and his friends in! They end up stuck in the basement, and when the room starts to rumble it looks like our trio are about to become dinner - will they get out alive?
3	"Lovestruck"	4 November 2015
Resus gets Luella to concoct a spell to stop his parents from arguing, but soon enough the whole town is feeling the love. How will Luella and Resus get out of this mess?
4	"Wolf Gang"	11 November 2015
Falling behind on his music work at school, Luke's parents get him a tutor.
5	"Resus Rocks"	18 November 2015
Brain Drain is in town and Resus is delighted when he finds out considering they are his favourite band.
6	"Zoo of the Weird"	25 November 2015
Otto is selling safari tickets to the residents of Scream Street.
7	"Mirror, Mirror"	2 December 2015
Resus feels like he is the family embarrassment, and wishes he was the vampire his parents dreamed of.
8	"Banished!"	9 December 2015
Otto plots to build himself a luxury home, which would mean forcing the Scream Street residents to live in tents.
9	"Heartbreak Heist"	14 December 2015
When Otto learns that the Farr family treasure lies buried somewhere beneath Scream Street, he forces Cleo to help him find it - by holding her heart to ransom! Unfortunately dim-witted Cleo's father has forgotten where the treasure is, so as everyone tries to find it, the situation becomes a race against time to save Cleo's heart.
10	"The Creepy Creeper"	15 December 2015
Luke never thinks about others and forgets to get his mother a birthday present. Knowing she is into gardening, he digs up a beautiful flower from the woods. The strange plant grows rapidly and begins to overtake the garden, trapping the Watsons. Luke and his friends must think fast before the plant takes over the whole town.
11	"The Brown Lagoon"	16 December 2015
Mr Watson is still terrified of the monsters in Scream Street, so Luke and Mrs Watson decide to take him on a relaxing weekend camping.
12	"Zombie Derby"	17 December 2015
Every year Scream Street stages a Zombie Derby. Tensions rise when Luke teams up with Resus's father and Resus with Luke's mother.
13	"Mother of All Scares"	19 December 2015
Luke goes home to find that Otto has moved in after fleeing Sneer Hall to escape a visiting relative with a bit of a temper. Then when Luke brings her round to visit Otto so that the two can reconcile, things don ot quite go to plan.
14	"Lost Looks"	6 May 2016
Eefa asks Luke, Resus and Cleo to help with a clean-up of the attic at the Emporium.
15	"Nightmare on Scream Street"	13 May 2016
Resus cannott get a goodnight sleep - he keeps having nightmares. Luke and Cleo decide to take Resus to Eefa's to try and find a solution to his problem.
16	"Bottomless Pit"	20 May 2016
Luke, Cleo and Resus have to clear away some rubbish from their homes. They discover what seems to be a bottomless pit.
17	"The Evil Ooze"	27 May 2016
The Underlands reaches its maximum "evil" capacity and pure evil starts to ooze out.
18	"Light Fingers"	10 June 2016
Otto is up to no good and is taking things that don ot belong to him. The friends must stop him and return the possessions to their rightful owner.
19	"Homework From Hell"	17 June 2016
Luke is used to putting off his homework but the more he puts it off, the bigger the burden grows. Until eventually his homework mutates into an unmanageable monster.
20	"The Curse of Eternal Youth"	24 June 2016
When Cleo utters an ancient Egyptian curse, time is stopped in Scream Street, releasing the evil monster the Brain Catcher from the Underlands.
21	"Blood is Thicker Than Water"	1 July 2016
Desperate to be a true vampire, Resus makes a wish at a wishing well, only to find out that the wishing well is evil and his parents are now normals! Can he reverse his wish before the Negatives are banished from Scream Street forever?
22	"Takeaway Terror"	8 July 2016
When Luke gets a job at Otto Burger, the three friends slowly discover that the burgers are not all they seem, and the secret sauce does terrible things to customers.
23	"The Zombie Body Shop"	15 July 2016
Otto's latest money-making scheme consists of stealing zombie body parts and selling them back. It ends up with him and the gang being mobbed by angry zombies. Can they find a way to escape and stop the zombies from tearing them all limb from limb?
24	"King Niles"	22 July 2016
Cleo thinks her father needs more authority and manages to turn two ushabti dolls into his servants. The power-mad mummies convince Niles to take over the town! Can the gang revert them into dolls before it is too late?
25	"Bad Blood"	29 July 2016
Grandfather Negative is in town and has very strong views on Resus not being a "real vampire". When Otto shuts off the blood supply to the town it gives Resus and his cape the chance to save the day.
26	"Trick or Shriek"	31 October 2016
Luke finds out that Scream Street does not celebrate Halloween, and decides to introduce his friends to it. Unfortunately what start as innocent Halloween decorations end up as an army of man-eating pumpkins!
27	"Monsters of Rock"	1 November 2016
Screamapalooza - a battle of the bands, has taken over the town. Resus is eager to win, and enlists the help of Luella to get a hold of one of Eefa's potions. He gets carried away and uses too much, and soon realises the potion has a dark side...
28	"The Beast Within"	2 November 2016
Luke is fed up with not being able to control who he is inside, and tries to separate his inner werewolf from his human self. But he soon realises they are better together than they are apart.
29	"Cry Wolf"	3 November 2016
Carla Black starts swapping Scream Street residents for robot versions of themselves. Resus is the only one that knows the truth, but will the others believe him before it is too late?
30	"The Uninvited"	4 November 2016
Luke throws a party, but does not invite Dixon, who decides to pump the Watsons' house full of poltergeists! The uninvited guests take over, and carry Resus off. Can they be stopped before they throw him into the Underlands?
31	"The Grumpus"	15 December 2016
It is Christmas on Scream Street, but nobody seems to enjoy it as much as Luke and his family... in fact they all seem terrified! Can Luke save the town from the Grumpus and restore a Merry Christmas?
32	"Body Swap"	30 January 2017
Resus gets his hands on the Hoop of Horus, and switches bodies with Eefa's bat. Chaos ensues when the hoop gets into the wrong hands.
33	"Gnome Sweet Gnome"	31 January 2017
Luke and Resus find an old map of Scream Street and start piecing together a sinister 3D puzzle, which turns out to be an evil garden gnome.
34	"Tutan Kutie"	1 February 2017
Cleo is feeling lonely as the only 4,000-year-old Ancient Egyptian child in town, but that all changes when her ex-boyfriend Tutan Kutie turns up. But is he all that he seems?
35	"Bone Cruncher"	2 February 2017
An air surfing competition comes to Scream Street. The gang all enter but do not realise they may have just signed their lives away.
36	"Earworm!"	6 February 2017
In an attempt to ingratiate himself with Vein, Resus gets Luella to bring an earworm back to life - with potentially disastrous results.
37	"Goblin Gas"	7 February 2017
When Otto steals Scream Street's entire power supply, the kids attempt to harness an explosive form of alternative energy - goblin gas.
38	"Nightmare Neighbour"	8 February 2017
Luke's plan to make his room uninhabitable and move in next door with Resus backfires when a pack of vampire rats invades.
39	"Uncle Memphis"	9 February 2017
Cleo tries to smarten Niles up and ends up replacing his bandages with those of his evil brother, Memphis.
40	"Friendly Neighbourhood Werewolf"	23 October 2017
Eefa casts a spell to save Luke from being evicted from Scream Street but accidentally freezes him mid-metamorphosis and he is stuck as a friendly werewolf.
41	"Brian Brain"	23 October 2017
Comedian Brian Brain hosts an evening for all of the Scream Street residents and manages to hypnotise everyone, except Luke. When a number of expensive items go missing, can Luke find out who is really behind the thefts?
42	"You Read My Mind"	24 October 2017
Luke secretly uses Eefa's new mind-reading potion to help him get top marks in his test. But the side effects of the potion leave Luke wishing he had not. Will Luke be able to find the antidote in time?
43	"Game of Screams"	25 October 2017
In an abandoned toy shop Luke and his friends discover a spooky board game. But this is no ordinary game - it has a mind of its own and will do anything to make sure they never escape...
44	"Summer Sucks!"	26 October 2017
Resus would do anything to be a proper vampire, but messing with nature always has consequences, which Resus discovers when he becomes the wrong kind of bloodsucker!
45	"The Plague"	27 October 2017
To avoid failing a test Cleo unleashes plagues over Scream Street, not realising how bad they would be - she is now desperate to stop them! Can she enlist the help of Luke and Resus before they ruin the entire town?
46	"The Dread Shoes"	30 October 2017
It is the Scream Street dance competition and everyone is pairing up in the hope of winning the trophy. Otto desperately wants to win and will do whatever is necessary to get his hands on the silverware.
47	"Grampy Vampy"	31 October 2017
When Resus' grandfather, Grampy Vampy, gets locked in Dr. Skully's confiscation cupboard, Luella uses a portal spell to get him back. But he is not the only thing that comes through the portal.
48	"Resus Goes Viral"	31 October 2017
Resus uses a virus to rid his friends of their monster abilities so he can win sports day for once, but the virus has terrible consequences! Can Resus save the town before there are no monsters left in Scream Street?
49	"Letter from the Underlands"	1 November 2017
When Resus gets a letter from his new pen pal in the Underlands, Luke and Cleo are suspicious. They know the Brain Catcher is trying to escape the Underlands again - so are these two things connected?
50	"Wheels of Death"	2 November 2017
When Luke's skateboard lands in goo from the Underlands, it develops a thoroughly evil mind of its own! But it seems it is not the only thing to be affected - Can Luke and the others stop the goo turning all objects evil?
51	"Lucky Penny"	3 November 2017
A lucky leprechaun head brings Luke all the luck he needs, but at a cost - everyone else now has bad luck! Luke must put everything right or he will be cast out from Scream Street.
