= Goldie (TV series) =

American animated series

- Genre: Children's; Comedy
- Created by: Emily Brundige
- Based on: Goldie by Emily Brundige
- Directed by: Graham MacDonald
- Starring: Jessica McKenna; Dee Bradley Baker; Amari McCoy; Vedanten Naidoo; Grey DeLisle; James Sie
- Countries of origin: United States; Canada
- Original language: English
- No. of seasons: 1
- No. of episodes: 13 (26 segments)

Production
- Executive producers: Emily Brundige; Clint Eland
- Running time: 23–24 minutes
- Production companies: Mercury Filmworks; Li'l Toughy; Apple Studios

Original release
- Network: Apple TV+
- Release: February 14, 2025

Goldie is an animated children's television series created by Emily Brundige for Apple TV+ based on her 2019 short film of the same name. Produced by Li'l Toughy and Apple Studios with animation provided by Mercury Filmworks, it was released on February 14, 2025, and has 13 episodes.

== Plot ==
The show follows the titular character Goldie, a giant girl, and her best friends Teeny and Petey in the small town of Boysenberg.

== Cast and characters ==
The following voice actors play these characters within the series:

- Jessica McKenna as Goldie. She was voiced by Lo Mutuc (then known as Charlyne Yi) in the 2019 short film.
- Amari McCoy as Teeny
- Vedanten Naidoo as Petey. He was voiced by Tex Hammond in the 2019 short film.
- Grey DeLisle as Mrs. Petunia, an occasionally grumpy elderly woman with a heart of gold and Goldie's frenemy
- James Sie as the Mayor
- Dee Bradley Baker as Romeo and Harold the Yeti

== Episodes ==
No.	Title	Written by	Original release date
1	"Giant Surprise"	Emily Brundige	February 14, 2025
1	"Stuck"	Emily Brundige	February 14, 2025
Giant Surprise - Goldie tries to find the perfect present for Teeny. Stuck - Goldie's friends band together to help her out of a sticky situation.
2	"Tall Teeny"	Emily Brundige	February 14, 2025
Tall Teeny - Realizing she's too short for rides at the fair, Teeny tries to grow taller. Pilroy - Petey's imaginary friend goes missing.
3	"The Hiding Spot"	Ben Greene	February 14, 2025
3	"Frand or Foe"	Emily Brundige	February 14, 2025
The Hiding Spot - Goldie struggles to play hide-and-seek like her friends. Frand or Foe - When she can't fit inside Teeny's house for a sleepover, Goldie gets creative.
4	"Birds of a Feather"	Jessica Combs	February 14, 2025
4	"Mayor Teeny"	Anna Trorup	February 14, 2025
Birds of a Feather - Goldie works hard to find a best friend for everyone. Mayor Teeny - Teeny steps into an important job for the day.
5	"Li'l Cutie"	Astride Noal	February 14, 2025
5	"Boysenween"	Saurin Choksi	February 14, 2025
Li'l Cutie - Inspired by Teeny's cat adoption, Goldie looks for a pet of her own. Boysenween - Goldie makes a costume for a magical springtime holiday.
6	"Damage Control"	Monica Dollive	February 14, 2025
6	"Petey the Stargazer"	Annabeth Bondor-Stone and Connor White	February 14, 2025
Damage Control - Mrs. Petunia searches for a new home. Petey the Stargazer - When Petey stops believing in aliens, Goldie tries to reignite the magic.
7	"The Choir"	Ben Greene	February 14, 2025
7	"The Egg"	Emily Brundige	February 14, 2025
The Choir - Goldie joins the choir but worries she's too loud. The Egg - Upon finding an egg in her nest, Goldie does her best to care for it.
8	"Super Goldie"	Jessica Combs	February 14, 2025
8	"A Mammoth Friend"	Saurin Choksi	February 14, 2025
Super Goldie - Goldie flies into action as her new heroic persona. A Mammoth Friend - A cuddly pal shares the same big feelings as Goldie.
9	"Teeny Ball"	Aaron Preacher	February 14, 2025
9	"A Crushing Nightmare"	Monica Dollive	February 14, 2025
Teeny Ball - Teeny creates a game - but it might just have too many rules. A Crushing Nightmare - Goldie has a nightmare and faces a new fear.
10	"Goldie on a Roll"	Astride Noal	February 14, 2025
10	"Big Time Trouble"	Anna Trorup	February 14, 2025
Goldie on a Roll - Goldie's friends team up to build a giant pair of roller skates. Big Time Trouble - Goldie travels back in time to undo an embarrassing moment.
11	"My Fair Goldie"	Jessica Combs	February 14, 2025
11	"Flying Solo"	Emily Brundige	February 14, 2025
My Fair Goldie - As the mayor's dinner party approaches, Goldie worries she isn't fancy enough. Flying Solo - Goldie struggles to take care of herself while Romeo is away.
12	"Goldie's Tooth"	Annabeth Bondor-Stone and Connor White	February 14, 2025
12	"Wooly's News"	Ben Greene	February 14, 2025
Goldie's Tooth - The tooth fairy leaves Goldie a special surprise. Wooly's News - Goldie feels sad when Wooly shares tough news.
13	"Earworm"	Monica Dollive	February 14, 2025
13	"The First Snow"	Saurin Choksi	February 14, 2025
Earworm - Goldie and Romeo write a catchy new tune that sweeps Boysenberg. The First Snow - A frosty surprise sparks major excitement.

== Awards and nominations ==
Year	Award	Category	Nominee(s)	Result
2026	4th Children's and Family Emmy Awards	Outstanding Writing for an Animated Program	"Frand or Foe"	Nominated
2026	4th Children's and Family Emmy Awards	Outstanding Voice Directing for an Animated Series	Kristi Reed (for "Petey the Stargazer")	Nominated
