= Ameerah Falzon-Ojo =

British actress (born 2002)

- Born: Ameerah Renata Falzon-Ojo; 4 February 2002 (age 24); London, England
- Occupations: Actress; model
- Years active: 2007–present

Ameerah Renata Falzon-Ojo (born 4 February 2002) is a British actress and model best known for her role as Jasmine 'Jas' Salford in the CBBC sitcom, So Awkward and her voice role as Frida on the Netflix animated series, Hilda.

== Biography ==
=== Early life ===
Ameerah Falzon-Ojo was born on 4 February 2002 in London, England. She is the daughter of Serena Maria Falzon.

She began her career as a child and began attending drama school when she was five. Ameerah trained in dance and drama at the Forecast Academy in London.

== Career ==
=== Theatre ===
Falzon-Ojo performed in local productions as a young child and in 2011, she was cast in a leading role in the Lincoln Center production of Rodgers and Hammerstein's musical South Pacific at the Barbican Theatre in London. At the age of nine, she was selected for Ambassador Theatre Group's 'Lion King Cub School'. In April 2012, she performed in The King & I as a royal child and in March 2013 she played as the orphan, July in a production of Annie Jr..

=== Television ===
In 2007, she appeared as Red Child - Mini Maker in an episode of Mister Maker, which aired on the CBeebies channel. In 2011, she had a child role in the CBBC series Fit.

From 2015 to 2019, she starred alongside Cleo Demetriou and Sophia Dall'Aglio in the CBBC sitcom So Awkward where she portrayed Jas Salford. When she left the show, actress Emily Burnett, who previously worked on The Dumping Ground as Charlie Morris took over the part of Jas, causing confusion amongst fans. It was even joked about in the trailer for Series 6. Neither Falzon-Ojo herself or the BBC have published a reason why she left Jas, and the question is still left unanswered.

From 2018 to 2023, Falzon-Ojo has been the voice of Frida on the animated Netflix series, Hilda where she stars alongside Bella Ramsey and Daisy Haggard. Falzon-Ojo is friends with Ramsey on Instagram since 2020. She also appeared in the 2021 animated film based on the series, entitled Hilda and the Mountain King, making it her first major role in a feature length film.

=== Modeling ===
She has also done modelling for clients such as Sky, Oxford University Press, McDonald's, Speedo, and Sony, in 2015 she signed to BMA Models.

== Personal life ==
Falzon-Ojo says that she is skilled in many accents, hip-hop dance, street dance, choreography, and fashion design.

== Filmography ==
=== Film ===
Year	Title	Role	Notes
2021	Hilda and the Mountain King	Frida	

=== Television ===
Year	Title	Role	Notes
2015–2019	So Awkward	Jasmine 'Jas' Salford	64 Episodes
2018	Saturday Mash-Up!	Celebrity Guest	1 Episode
2018–2023	Hilda	Frida	26 Episodes

=== Theatre ===
Year	Production	Role	Notes
2011	South Pacific	Bloody Mary's Assistant	The Barbican
2012	South Pacific	Bloody Mary's Assistant	ATG Tour
