= Blexbolex =

French comics artist and illustrator

Bernard Granger
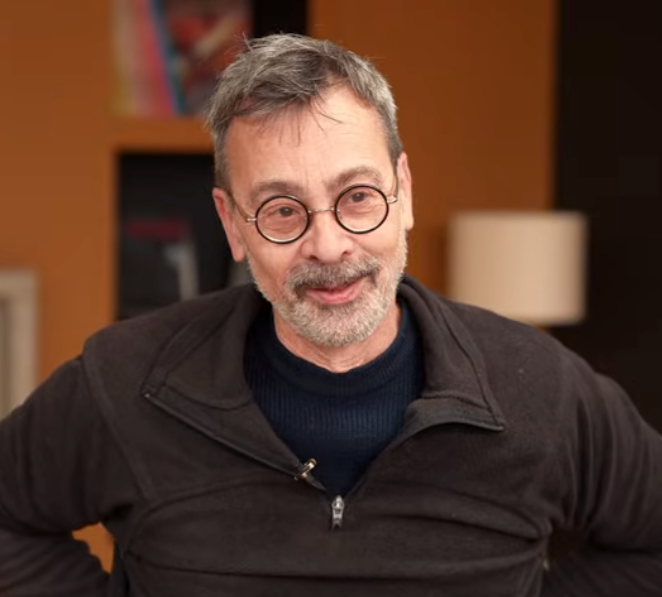
- In a 2025 interview
- Born: 1966 (age 59–60) Douai, France
- Areas: Cartoonist, illustrator
- Pseudonym: Blexbolex
- Awards: Best Book Design (Book Fair of Leipzig)

Blexbolex (born 1966) is a French comics artist and illustrator. Born Bernard Granger in Douai, he studied screen printing (sérigraphie) at the School of Fine Arts (L'école européenne supérieure de l'image) in Angoulême. His first works were self-published, and later he contributed to Popo Color, Fusée, and Ferraille. His highly stylized, ligne claire illustration, inspired by the films of Jacques Tati and whodunits of the 1950s and 1960s, gradually gained an audience. In Germany, he directed an art studio at the Kunsthochschule Berlin-Weissensee (School of Art and Design Berlin-Weissensee) and he also worked regularly with a number of editors, including Thierry Magnier, Pipifax, United Dead Artists, Les Requins-Marteaux, and Cornélius. Blexbolex has contributed to the American publication The Ganzfeld.

In 2009, he received a prize for "Best Book Design of the World" for his L'Imagier des gens (2008) at the Book Fair of Leipzig.

== Works ==
=== Children's books ===
- Les Souvenirs d'Elmir Grömek et de son chien Pikü : Rogaton Man / written by Frau Mental. Éditions du Seuil jeunesse 2001
- L'Affaire Noël/ written by Gérard Moncomble. Nathan jeunesse, 2003.
- Bim de la jungle. Thierry Magnier, 2004. (Coll. "Tête de lard"; N° 43)
- Petites et Grandes Fables de Sophios/ Michel Piquemal. Albin Michel jeunesse, 2004.
- Les Petites Malices de Nasreddine / written by Jihad Darwiche. Albin Michel jeunesse, 2005.
- La Longue-vue. Thierry Magnier, 2005. (Coll. "Petite poche BD").
- De vert de rage à rose bonbon : toutes les couleurs de notre langue / Annie Mollard-Desfour, Bénédicte Rivière; illustrations de Blexbolex. Albin Michel jeunesse, 2006. (Coll. "Humour en mots")
- L'Oncle américain d'Achille Pellison / Didier Lévy; illustrations by Blexbolex. Oskar jeunesse, 2006. (Coll."Histoires à lire et à écouter"". Benjamin; 3)
- Peindre. Thierry Magnier, 2006. (Coll. "Petite poche BD")
- Mon ami triangle. Albin Michel jeunesse, 2007. (Livres de bain).
- Mon ami rond. Albin Michel jeunesse, 2007. (Livres de bain).
- L'Imagier des gens. Albin Michel Jeunesse, 2008.
- Saisons. Albin Michel Jeunesse, 2009.
- Seasons. Gecko Press, 2010 ISBN 9781877467622
- People. Gecko Press, 2011 ISBN 9781877467783
- Romance. Albin Michel Jeunesse, 2013.
- Nos vacances. Albin Michel Jeunesse, 2017. English translation: Vacation. Enchanted Lion Books, 2018.
- The Holidays. Gecko Press, 2018 ISBN 978-1-776571-93-2

=== Graphic novels ===
- Bad boy boogie. Paris : Vermine, 2000.
- L'Enclos. Cornélius, 2001. (Coll. "Louise"; 3)
- Dats Fun. Éditions Le 9 Monde, 2006. (Livre en sérigraphie; 120 ex. numérotés & signés par l'artiste)
- L'Œil privé. Albi : les Requins-marteaux, 2006. (Coll. "Inox")
- Destination Abecederia. Les Requins Marteaux, 2008.
- Crime chien. Pipfax, 2008 (Livre en sérigraphie)
- La Fêlure. Ouvroir Humoir, 2009, 24 pl. ISBN 978-2-913063-36-5 (screenprinting, 1000 ex.)
- "No Man's Land" Nobrow Press 2012

=== Other ===
- "I Know How To Cook" by Ginette Mathiot, designed English language edition, Phaidon Press, 2009
