= Luke Pearson =

British illustrator

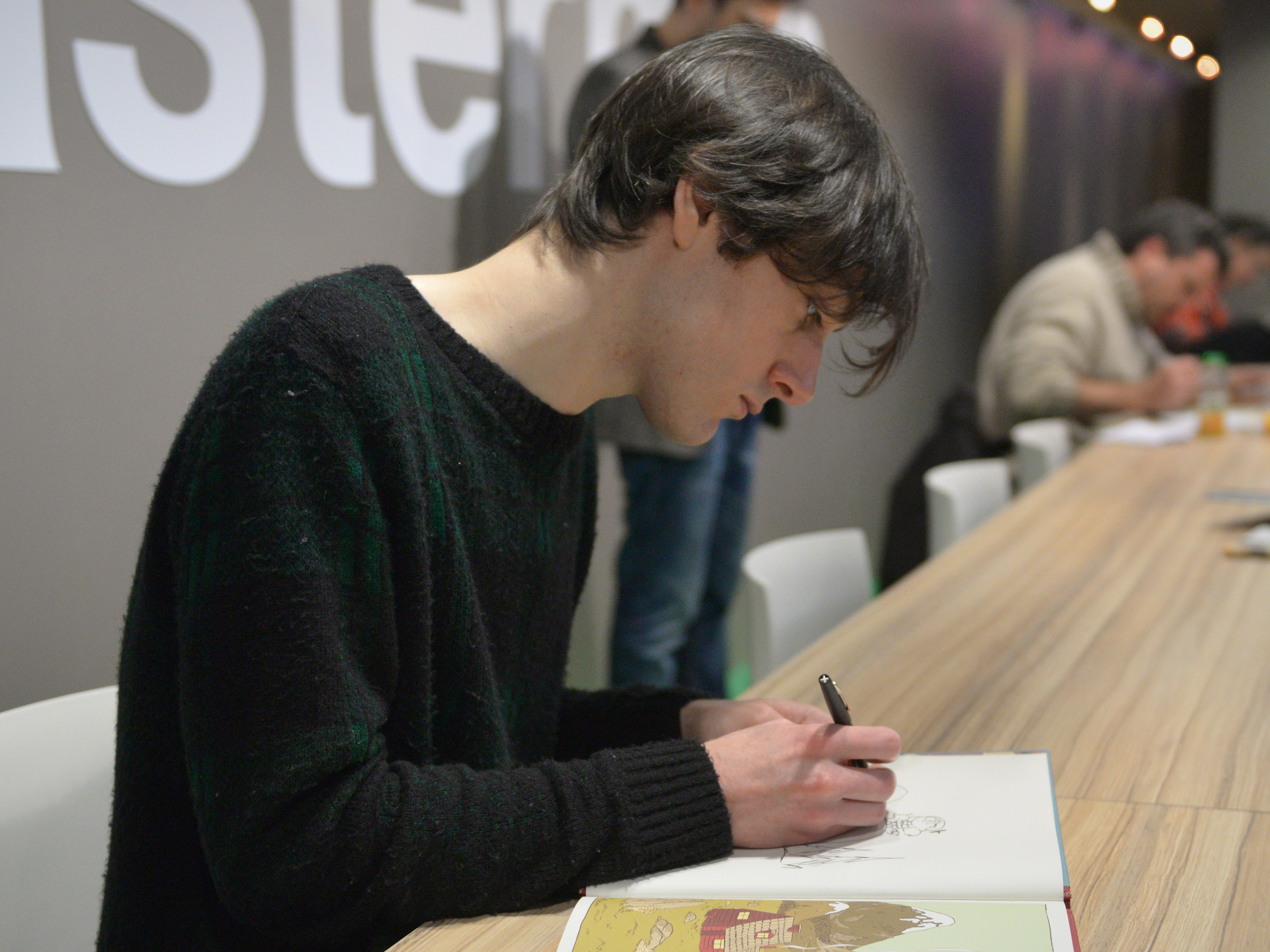
- Pearson at the 2015 Angoulême Festival
- Born: 12 October 1987 (age 39) Stockton-on-Tees, County Durham, England
- Areas: Cartoonist, Writer, Artist, Colourist
- Notable works: Hilda; Everything We Miss

Luke Pearson (born 12 October 1987) is a British illustrator, cartoonist, and comic book writer best known for the Hilda series of comics for Nobrow Press, and Hilda, the Netflix series based on the comics. He has also storyboarded episodes of the Cartoon Network series Adventure Time, during its fifth and seventh seasons.

== Early life ==
Luke Pearson was born in Stockton-on-Tees, but grew up mainly in Tamworth. His father worked in IT and his mother was a solicitor's secretary. In their spare time, his father played and recorded music and his mother painted. Pearson went to Loughborough University where he graduated with a Bachelor of Arts Degree in Illustration.

== Career ==
=== Bibliography ===
His first comic was published in 2008 as part the anthology Ctrl.Alt.Shift Unmasks Corruption, edited by Paul Gravett. His first published drawing was in Bizarre magazine "of a little kid holding a knife with his mouth all stitched up".

In 2010, Nobrow Press published Hildafolk, the first of a series of graphic novels about a young girl's adventures in a world inspired by Scandinavian folklore.

In 2018, Netflix released the first season of Hilda, a show based on the Hildafolk series.

Year	Title	Writer and illustrator	Publisher	ISBN
2010	Hildafolk (re-released as Hilda and the Troll in 2013 by Flying Eye Books)	Luke Pearson	Nobrow Press	ISBN 978-1907704048
2011	Hilda and the Midnight Giant	Luke Pearson	Nobrow Press	ISBN 978-1907704253
2011	Everything We Miss	Luke Pearson	Nobrow Press	ISBN 978-1907704178
2012	Hilda and the Bird Parade	Luke Pearson	Nobrow Press	ISBN 978-1909263062
2013	Hilda and the Troll (re-release of Hildafolk)	Luke Pearson	Flying Eye Books (London)	ISBN 978-1909263147
2014	Hilda and the Black Hound	Luke Pearson	Nobrow Press	ISBN 978-1909263185
2016	Hilda and the Stone Forest	Luke Pearson	Nobrow Press	ISBN 978-1909263741
2019	Hilda and the Mountain King	Luke Pearson	Flying Eye Books (London)	ISBN 978-1911171171
2019	Hilda and the Hidden People	Luke Pearson, Stephen Davies, Seaerra Miller	Flying Eye Books (London)	ISBN 978-1912497881
2019	Hilda and the Great Parade	Luke Pearson, Stephen Davies, Seaerra Miller	Flying Eye Books (London)	ISBN 978-1912497294
2019	Hilda and the Nowhere Space	Luke Pearson, Stephen Davies, Seaerra Miller	Flying Eye Books (London)	ISBN 978-1912497430
2020	Hilda and the Time Worm	Luke Pearson, Stephen Davies, Victoria Evans	Flying Eye Books (London)	ISBN 978-1912497102
2020	Hilda and the Ghost Ship	Luke Pearson, Stephen Davies, Sapo Lendário	Flying Eye Books (London)	ISBN 978-1838740283
2020	Hilda and the White Woff	Luke Pearson, Stephen Davies, Sapo Lendário	Flying Eye Books (London)	ISBN 978-1838740290
2023	Hilda and the Laughing Merman	Luke Pearson, Stephen Davies, Sapo Lendário	Flying Eye Books (London)	ISBN 978-1838741020
2023	Hilda and the Faratok Tree	Luke Pearson, Stephen Davies, Sapo Lendário	Flying Eye Books (London)	ISBN 978-1838741037
2023	Hilda and the Fairy Village	Luke Pearson, Stephen Davies, Sapo Lendário	Flying Eye Books (London)	ISBN 978-1838741044
2024	Hilda and Twig: Hide from the Rain	Luke Pearson	Flying Eye Books (London)	ISBN 978-1838741563
2025	Hilda and Twig: Wake the Ice Man	Luke Pearson	Flying Eye Books (London)	ISBN 978-1838742928

== Filmography ==
=== Film ===
Year	Title	Executive producer	Screenwriter	Notes
2021	Hilda and the Mountain King	Yes	Yes	Co-executive producer

=== Television ===
Year	Title	Producer	Screenwriter	Storyboard artist	Notes
2013–2015	Adventure Time		Yes	Yes	
2018–2023	Hilda	Yes	Yes		Also creator and developer

== Awards and nominations ==
Year	Award	Category	Nominee(s)	Result	Ref
2012	British Comic Awards	Young People's Comic Award	Hilda and the Midnight Giant	Won	
2014	Eisner Awards	Best Writer/Artist	Hilda and the Bird Parade	Nominated	
2019	Daytime Emmy Awards	Outstanding Children's Animated Series; Shared with Clint Eland, Kurt Mueller, Stephanie Simpson, Adam Idelson, Chantal Ling, Rachel Simon and Andrew Hymas	Hilda	Nominated	
2019	BAFTA Children's Awards	Children's Animation; Shared with Bella Ramsey, Stephanie Simpson, and Kurt Mueller	Hilda	Won	
