= Hilda (graphic novel series) =

British children's graphic novel series

- Franchise logo used since 2018
- Created by: Luke Pearson
- Original work: Hildafolk (2010)
- Owners: Books: Nobrow Press; TV series: Sony Pictures Entertainment/Netflix

Print publications
- Book(s): see § Publication history

Films and television
- Film(s): Hilda and the Mountain King (2021)
- Animated series: Hilda (2018–2023)

Games
- Traditional: Hilda Creatures (2018)

Audio
- Soundtrack(s): Hilda and the Mountain King (Original Motion Picture Soundtrack); Hilda: Season 1 (Original Series Soundtrack); Hilda: Season 2 (Original Series Soundtrack); Hilda: Season 3 (Original Series Soundtrack)

Hilda (also known as Hildafolk) is a British children's graphic novel series written and illustrated by Luke Pearson and published by Nobrow Press. A television series adaptation was released on Netflix on 21 September 2018. Following the success of the Netflix series, several story book tie-ins were published.

== Content ==
The graphic novels are set in a fantastic world resembling a late 20th century Scandinavia. They draw inspiration from Nordic folklore and the Moomins. The titular character is a small girl, who in the first two books lives with her mother in a cottage on a plain surrounded by mountains and forests, but later moves to the city Trolberg. Hilda's world is inhabited by regular people as well as fantastical creatures like trolls, giants, elves and spirits. In the fourth book, Hilda joins Trolberg's Sparrow Scouts.

== Main characters ==
- Hilda - The main heroine, a headstrong, smart, kind and curious girl, keen on exploring the world around her with an open mind. Even though she interacts with her classmates and fellow scouts, she mostly keeps to herself, preferring to explore and make friends with fantastical creatures.
- Twig – Hilda's faithful pet deerfox (half deer, half fox).
- Johanna – Hilda's mother is caring and supportive, but often worries for her daughter. In her youth she was a Sparrow Scout, a fictional Trolberg equivalent to scouting groups.

== Publication history ==
| Year | Original title | Writer and illustrator | Publisher | ISBN | Format | Notes |
|---|---|---|---|---|---|---|
| 2010 | Hildafolk | Luke Pearson | Nobrow Press (London) | ISBN 978-1907704048 | Comics | Re-released as Hilda and the Troll in 2013 by Flying Eye Books (London), ISBN 978-1909263147 |
| 2011 | Hilda and the Midnight Giant | Luke Pearson | Nobrow Press (London) | ISBN 978-1907704253 | Graphic novel | |
| 2012 | Hilda and the Bird Parade | Luke Pearson | Nobrow Press (London) | ISBN 978-1909263062 | Graphic novel | |
| 2014 | Hilda and the Black Hound | Luke Pearson | Flying Eye Books (London) | ISBN 978-1909263185 | Graphic novel | |
| 2016 | Hilda and the Stone Forest | Luke Pearson | Flying Eye Books (London) | ISBN 978-1909263741 | Graphic novel | |
| 2019 | Hilda and the Mountain King | Luke Pearson | Flying Eye Books (London) | ISBN 978-1911171171 | Graphic novel | |
| 2019 | Hilda and the Hidden People | Luke Pearson, Stephen Davies, Seaerra Miller | Flying Eye Books (London) | ISBN 978-1912497881 | Story book | Hilda Netflix Tie-In 1 |
| 2019 | Hilda and the Great Parade | Luke Pearson, Stephen Davies, Seaerra Miller | Flying Eye Books (London) | ISBN 978-1912497294 | Story book | Hilda Netflix Tie-In 2 |
| 2019 | Hilda and the Nowhere Space | Luke Pearson, Stephen Davies, Seaerra Miller | Flying Eye Books (London) | ISBN 978-1912497430 | Story book | Hilda Netflix Tie-In 3 |
| 2020 | Hilda and the Time Worm | Luke Pearson, Stephen Davies, Victoria Evans | Flying Eye Books (London) | ISBN 978-1912497102 | Story book | Hilda Netflix Tie-In 4 |
| 2020 | Hilda and the Ghost Ship | Luke Pearson, Stephen Davies, Sapo Lendário | Flying Eye Books (London) | ISBN 978-1838740283 | Story book | Hilda Netflix Tie-In 5 |
| 2020 | Hilda and the White Woff | Luke Pearson, Stephen Davies, Sapo Lendário | Flying Eye Books (London) | ISBN 978-1838740290 | Story book | Hilda Netflix Tie-In 6 |
| 2023 | Hilda and the Laughing Merman | Luke Pearson, Stephen Davies, Sapo Lendário | Flying Eye Books (London) | ISBN 978-1838748760 | Story book | Hilda Netflix Tie-In 7 |
| 2023 | Hilda and the Faratok Tree | Luke Pearson, Stephen Davies, Sapo Lendário | Flying Eye Books (London) | ISBN 978-1838748760 | Story book | Hilda Netflix Tie-In 8 |
| 2023 | Hilda and the Fairy Village | Luke Pearson, Stephen Davies, Sapo Lendário | Flying Eye Books (London) | ISBN 978-1838748784 | Story book | Hilda Netflix Tie-In 9 |
| 2024 | Hilda and Twig: Hide from the Rain | Luke Pearson | Flying Eye Books (London) | ISBN 978-1838741563 | Graphic novel | Prequel story set prior to Hilda and the Midnight Giant; First installment in the Hilda and Twig series |
| 2025 | Hilda and Twig: Wake the Ice Man | Luke Pearson | Flying Eye Books (London) | ISBN 978-1838742928 | Graphic novel | Second installment in the Hilda and Twig series |

The Hilda graphic novels were released in locally translated versions in several other countries, including France, Germany, Italy, Spain, Poland, Sweden, Norway, Czech Republic, Serbia, Croatia, Russia. and Vietnam.

In a 2019 interview, Luke Pearson stated that Hilda and the Mountain King would be the last volume in the original series and that he would be working on other graphic novel projects in the future.

== Reception and awards ==
=== Critical reception ===
The series was highly praised by critics and fans alike. The New York Times review by Pamela Paul of the volume Hilda and the Bird Parade draws comparisons between Pearson's fantastic worlds and the creations of Hayao Miyazaki, further stating: "In Hilda's world, daytime is drawn in burnt orange, maroon and drab olive, and the night is an icy, eerie wash of dark teal and minty blue. Each landscape contains its own tantalizing visions." Alexandra Lange's article about the whole series for The New Yorker also stresses the similarities with Miyazaki's works and talks about the complexity of Pearson's creations and their appeal to kids and adults alike: “Pearson's aesthetic is sophisticated for the often candy-colored world of children's animation, and the plots fit neatly into a number of present-day parenting preoccupations.”

In July 2013, Hilda and the Midnight Giant was featured in The Best 7 Books for Young Readers list released by Deutschlandfunk, a German public radio station. Hilda and the Midnight Giant was also nominated in The Cartoonist Studio Prize for Best Graphic Novel of the Year: 2012 Shortlist in Slate's The Cartoonist Studio Prize in 2013. The same year in November Hilda and the Bird Parade was included in the list of Notable Children's Books of 2013 by The New York Times.

=== Awards and nominations ===
| Year | Book | Status | Award |
|---|---|---|---|
| 2012 | Hilda and the Midnight Giant | Won | British Comic Awards, Young People's Comic Award |
| 2013 | Hilda and the Bird Parade | Nominated | Angoulême International Comics Festival, Sélection Jeunesse |
| 2014 | Hilda and the Midnight Giant | Won | Max & Moritz Prize, Best Comic Book for Kids |
| 2014 | Hilda and the Midnight Giant | Won | Gran Guinigi, Best Book Series |
| 2014 | Hilda and the Bird Parade | Nominated | Eisner Award, Best Publication for Kids (ages 8–12) |
| 2014 | Hilda and the Bird Parade | Nominated | Eisner Award, Best Writer/Artist |
| 2015 | Hilda and the Black Hound | Won | Dwayne McDuffie Award for Kids' Comics |
| 2017 | Hilda and the Stone Forest | Nominated | Eisner Award, Best Publication for Kids (ages 9–12) |
| 2017 | Hilda and the Stone Forest | Nominated | Dwayne McDuffie Award for Kids' Comics |

== TV adaptation ==
The TV production and licensing company Silvergate Media launched an animated series based on the graphic novels exclusively on Netflix on 21 September 2018 to widespread acclaim. The series' second season was released on 14 December 2020, and a feature film adaptation of Hilda and the Mountain King was released on 30 December 2021. The series has also inspired other media including a mobile app and several tie-in novels.
