= Nobrow Press =

British publishing company

Coordinates: 51.5375°N 0.0590°W

- Founded: 2008
- Founder: Sam Arthur and Alex Spiro
- Country of origin: United Kingdom
- Headquarters location: London
- Distribution: Bounce Sales & Marketing (UK); Penguin Random House (US); Walker Books (Australia)
- Key people: Harry Gwinner
- Publication types: Books
- Imprints: Flying Eye Books
- Official website: www.nobrow.net

Nobrow Press is a British comics publishing company based in London, England. Nobrow is known for its bi-annual eponymous anthology, for publishing the works of Blexbolex, Luke Pearson, Jon McNaught and Jesse Moynihan, and for exposing the English-speaking world to works by European artists. The publisher is seen as a champion of DIY culture.

Nobrow's works are distributed in the U.S. by Penguin Random House.

== History ==
The company was founded in October 2008 by Sam Arthur and Alex Spiro with the intention "to publish books that deserved to be printed."

In January 2012 the company curated the two-week "This Is Not a Pop-Up" event at the Hayward Gallery shop, where-by they hosted musicians, artists and a workshop for children as well as offering their products for sale. In September 2012 the company attended the Small Press Expo, with co-founder Arthur participating in the panel "British Comics: Does it Translate". In early 2012 it was announced that Nobrow was to work on the launch of a sister imprint, focused on children's publishing, with 12 titles to publish in 2013. In September 2013, Nobrow opened a New York City office, headed by Creative Director Alex Spiro. As well as aiding US distribution efforts, the satellite would focus on newly formed relationships with TV and Film studios, who had taken an interest in some of their titles, such as Hilda.

In June 2016, it was announced by Netflix that they would be producing, along with Silvergate Media, Hilda, an animated TV series for children based on Luke Pearson's graphic novel series of the same name.

== Aesthetic ==
Nobrow utilizes an idiosyncratic printing approach which allows the publisher to achieve a striking palette of colours in its books. It also carefully oversees the paper stock used, in order to create books that evoke a sense of history. The company's publishing aesthetic has been described by Rob Clough in The Comics Journal as one that is "part Drawn & Quarterly and part Blab!, where design and color are often more important than line and narrative. This is not to say that narrative is irrelevant in these comics, only that the narrative direction is more on the abstruse side. The design, packaging, and attention to detail and color here are almost painfully exquisite."
