= List of Octonauts episodes =

This is a list of episodes of the television series Octonauts, a British children's television series produced by Silvergate Media for the BBC channel CBeebies.

== Series overview ==
Series	Episodes	Originally released	
Series	Episodes	First released	Last released
1	50	4 October 2010	11 February 2011
2	22	19 November 2012	3 September 2013
3	20	4 September 2013	22 September 2015
4	24	23 September 2015	27 October 2017
Specials	12	13 December 2010	30 March 2021
5	27	27 March 2023	30 September 2026

== Episodes ==
=== Series 1 (2010–11) ===
Written by: Stephanie Simpson, Billy Aronson, Glen Berger, Ian Carney, Cydne Clark, Cusi Cram, Sarah Durkee, Steve Granat, Carin Greenberg, Jonathan Greenberg, Peter K. Hirsch, Adam Idelson, Dave Ingham, Catherine Lieuwen, Myles McLeod, Allan Neuwirth, Sascha Paladino, and Gabe Pulliam.

No. overall	No. in series	Title	Octo-Alert sounded by	Original release date	Creature Report air date
1	1	"The Octonauts and the Whale Shark"	Peso	4 October 2010	9 January 2011
When Dashi is swallowed by a whale shark, mistaken for a cave, the Octonauts venture inside of him to come and rescue her.
2	2	"The Octonauts and the Undersea Storm"	Dashi	5 October 2010	15 January 2011
An undersea storm is approaching so Kwazii helps some creatures on a coral reef reach safety, but then he crashes the Gup-B while he is also trying to race back to the Octopod. When the GUP-C's tow-rope snaps while rescuing him, some reef lobsters Kwazii helped earlier lend a hand by holding the broken rope ends together with their strong claws.
3	3	"The Octonauts and the Crab and Urchin"	Kwazii	6 October 2010	6 February 2011
Barnacles and Kwazii investigate a disruption on a nearby reef; A carrier crab and the urchin he keeps on top of his shell as a defence against predators has a falling out and just can't seem to get along.
4	4	"The Octonauts and the Walrus Chief"	Kwazii	7 October 2010	1 February 2013
A walrus mistakes Peso's medical bag for a clam and takes it home. Walruses don't like other animals near their colonies, so Captain Barnacles, Kwazii, and Peso disguise themselves as a fellow walrus to sneak into the dangerous colony and retrieve the medical bag.
5	5	"The Octonauts and the Flying Fish"	Kwazii	8 October 2010	14 May 2011
A school of flying fish accidentally make off with Professor Inkling's rare book and the Octonauts rig up the GUP-B to get it back.
6	6	"The Octonauts and the Giant Squid"	Inkling	11 October 2010	23 January 2011
The Octonauts set out to find and photograph Inkling's long-lost cousin, the giant squid.
7	7	"The Octonauts and the Orca"	Kwazii; Barnacles (briefly)	12 October 2010	5 February 2011
An enormous killer whale is stranded on a beach, and with some help from some fiddler crabs, the Octonauts manage to rescue him.
8	8	"The Octonauts and the Great Algae Escape"	Barnacles	13 October 2010	17 April 2011
The crew must catch a runaway Octopod after it is hijacked by a group of crustaceans who are trying to flee an area of seabed being polluted with algae by a broken pipeline.
9	9	"The Octonauts and the Remipedes"	Tweak	14 October 2010	12 February 2011
Shellington goes to search for a group of remipedes in a cave but he hasn't driven the GUP-D before and ends up crashing it and breaking it. The other Octonauts try to save him but they get lost too. Luckily, a group of blind remipedes help them find their way out of the cave.
10	10	"The Octonauts and the Speedy Sailfish"	Barnacles	15 October 2010	21 May 2011
Tweak's remote control system for the Gups' malfunctions, so Barnacles and Kwazii are forced to chase after them with the pedal-driven GUP-F. Luckily some speedy sailfish, the fastest fish in the sea, are persuaded to show their off prowess by rounding up the speeding Gups.
11	11	"The Octonauts and the Blobfish Brothers"	Dashi	18 October 2010	7 May 2011
The Octonauts must evacuate some slow-moving, gelatinous blobfish before an undersea volcano erupts.
12	12	"The Octonauts and the Monster Map"	Kwazii	19 October 2010	16 January 2011
Kwazii has a pirate map showing the location of a sunken treasure ship that allegedly harbours a Kraken-like a sea monster, but it turns out to be an octopus that can change colour to camouflage himself.
13	13	"The Octonauts and the Lost Sea Star"	Kwazii	20 October 2010	28 May 2011
A sea star named Twinkle has got lost on the beach, but the Octonauts have to search the sea from top to bottom to find her home, as there are nearly 2,000 species of sea star living at all levels of the ocean. On a reef in the Sunlight Zone, they encounter a sunflower sea star and a predatory long-spine porcupinefish. In the Twilight Zone they encounter brittle stars and get chased into a cave by a wolf eel, where they notice Twinkle glows in the dark, which means she is from the Midnight Zone. They end up crashing the Gup at the bottom of an oceanic trench, but luminous sea stars light the way out for them.
14	14	"The Octonauts and the Albino Humpback Whale"	Kwazii	21 October 2010	22 January 2011
The Octonauts think they've seen a ghost but it turns out to be an albino humpback whale who is moaning from the pain of a nasty sunburn.
15	15	"The Octonauts and the Giant Kelp Forest"	Tweak	22 October 2010	10 April 2011
Kwazii's favorite sub, the GUP-B, goes missing in a huge kelp forest due to Kwazii pressing the eject button while the engine was active (Something Tweak advised him not to do) and Kwazii, Captain Barnacles, and Shellington must retrieve it, meeting strange and interesting creatures along the way.
16	16	"The Octonauts and the Enemy Anemones"	Pudding (Accidentally)	25 October 2010	22 May 2011
The Octonauts land on an island for a picnic, but first, must help some crabs trapped between two warring groups of aggregate anemones. Meanwhile, back on the Octopod, a horde of out-of-control puddings come to attack.
17	17	"The Octonauts and the Narwhal"	Dashi	26 October 2010	23 April 2011
When the Octopod cruises underwater to Captain Barnacles' homeland, the North Pole, it gets trapped in the Arctic sea ice, but one of Barnacles' old friends, Boris the narwhal, helps them break through the ice with his long tusk.
18	18	"The Octonauts and the Midnight Zone"	Tweak	27 October 2010	15 May 2011
The Octonauts explore the deepest part of the ocean where no daylight ever reaches and find some hydrothermal vents where pink vent fish, limpets and giant tube worms live, and they also discover a new species of worm to be put in Shellington's book.
19	19	"The Octonauts and the Snapping Shrimp"	Peso	28 October 2010	24 April 2011
A little shrimp with a big claw makes such a loud noise that it stuns the Octonauts. A video of it made by Dashi reveals that the sound and accompanying shock wave are caused by the shrimp while she was making a cavitation bubble with her claw.
20	20	"The Octonauts and the Snot Sea Cucumber"	Kwazii	29 October 2010	30 January 2011
After an underwater tremor, an injured sea cucumber named Slippy gets loose on the Octopod, so to let her breathe, they flood the ship!
21	21	"The Octonauts and the Giant Whirlpool"	Tweak	1 November 2010	8 May 2011
The Octonauts race against time to rescue Tweak's friend, a leatherback sea turtle named Sandy when she is swept away in a current (leading to a whirlpool) from the Australian coast where she was preparing to lay her eggs.
22	22	"The Octonauts and the Hermit Crabs"	Peso	2 November 2010	16 April 2011
With half the crew stranded in a rock pool due to a low tide, Peso and Tweak help to remove a stuck hermit crab from the shell he has outgrown.
23	23	"The Octonauts and the Mixed Up Whales"	Barnacles	3 November 2010	9 April 2011
The Octonauts clean and repair the Octopod, but the loud noises they are creating confuse the sonar of two blue whales who are looking for each other so much that they almost crash into the ship.
24	24	"The Octonauts and the Kelp Forest Rescue"	(Not shown on screen)	4 November 2010	5 December 2012
Peso's little brother Pinto visits the Octonauts and gets an eyepatch from Kwazii. He becomes more interested in being a pirate than a medic (stating that he wanted to be a 'real' Octonaut like Kwazii). But when he helps Barnacles, Kwazii, and Peso in a mission to help Dashi and Shellington escape, he begins to like being a medic. This is the only episode where the Octo-Alert was sounded by itself, where no one was filmed pressing any of its buttons until a later episode in the fourth season.
25	25	"The Octonauts and the Decorator Crab"	Kwazii	5 November 2010	8 January 2011
The Octonauts stake out a thief, who turns out to be a decorator crab, stealing their things to decorate his shell.
26	26	"The Octonauts and the Beluga Whales"	Kwazii	6 December 2010	29 May 2011
The Octonauts lead a pod of beluga whales stuck under the pack ice to safety by getting them to follow Peso while he's playing the same tune as the beluga's song on his xylophone.
27	27	"The Octonauts and the Hungry Pilot Fish"	Peso	7 December 2010	4 June 2011
The Octonauts are chased by a whitetip shark only to discover all he needed was a pilot fish to clean his teeth, and he just so happens that they have just met a lonely pilot fish that is hungry for action.
28	28	"The Octonauts and the Vampire Squid"	Kwazii	8 December 2010	5 June 2011
When Peso goes on a solo training dive to the Midnight Zone, he encounters a hurt vampire squid. When he's scared by the sudden arrival of Kwazii and Captain Barnacles, he sprays them with sticky bioluminescent mucus and flees, but in the end, Peso can help him out.
29	29	"The Octonauts and the Seahorse Tale"	Peso	9 December 2010	13 April 2013
After a storm, the Octonauts help a female seahorse search for her missing mate. She tells them to Kwazii's surprise that the missing male seahorse is about to give birth to baby seahorses!
30	30	"The Octonauts and the Giant Jelly"	Barnacles	10 December 2010	5 January 2013
The Octonauts must rescue Peso when he gets trapped inside a giant ctenophore.
31	31	"The Octonauts and the Cookiecutter Sharks"	Tweak	13 December 2010	11 June 2011
Some mysterious holes that keep appearing in the Octonauts' equipment turn out to be the work of cookiecutter sharks whose bioluminescence initially made them invisible against the light coming down from the sea surface.
32	32	"The Octonauts and the Oarfish"	Pinto	14 December 2010	12 June 2011
Dashi catches a glimpse of an elusive creature that appears to be a giant sea serpent and manages to photograph his tail. The truth is stranger than fiction when he appears to be an awesomely long oarfish.
33	33	"The Octonauts and the Combtooth Blenny"	Dashi	15 December 2010	18 June 2011
Kwazii crashes the GUP-E, leaving him and Peso marooned on a desert island inhabited by a fish who can walk on land. Their SOS message to the Octonauts is relayed in increasingly garbled form via the combtooth blenny, a blue fish, a squid, and an anglerfish.
34	34	"The Octonauts and the Jellyfish Bloom"	Kwazii	16 December 2010	19 June 2011
Shellington gets trapped by sea nettle jellyfish whilst observing garden eels in the GUP-E. Barnacles, Kwazii, and Peso attempt to save him but Barnacles gets stung by a jellyfish. Luckily, Peso heals it using vinegar and then goes to save Shellington along with Kwazii.
35	35	"The Octonauts and the Baby Dolphin"	Tweak	17 December 2010	25 June 2011
A young dolphin follows Kwazii home while he's babysitting him and the Octonauts must search for his mummy.
36	36	"The Octonauts and the Scary Spookfish"	Dashi	24 January 2011	26 June 2011
Peso gets jammed in an oceanic trench when the GUP-E's battery dies and is surprised by a strange deep sea fish with a transparent head: a spookfish called Boo, whose ability to see vertically comes in handy as GUP-C winches GUP-E back up the narrow trench.
37	37	"The Octonauts and the Arctic Orcas"	Kwazii	25 January 2011	3 April 2011
Captain Barnacles and Peso get lost in the icy Arctic sea when the GUP-E gets stuck in an iceberg and the Gup finder is damaged. Fortunately, a pod of orcas help Kwazii find them.
38	38	"The Octonauts and the Slime Eels"	Kwazii	26 January 2011	2 April 2011
In the North Atlantic, Kwazii searches the sunken shipwreck of his pirate grandfather, Calico Jack, for his gold spyglass. It's guarded by blind hagfish (slime eels), but their slime unexpectedly helps him when he gets stuck. Kwazii ends up leaving the spyglass because it's now the home of sea creatures.
39	39	"The Octonauts and the Enormous Elephant Seal"	Kwazii	27 January 2011	27 March 2011
An enormous elephant seal is brought into the Octopod to moult as moulting underwater is dangerous. But then he overstays his welcome in the Octopod.
40	40	"The Octonauts and the Sardine School"	Dashi	28 January 2011	26 March 2011
The Octonauts must work together as a team to help a lost sardine find her school.
41	41	"The Octonauts and the Dolphin Reef Rescue"	Barnacles	31 January 2011	20 March 2011
Peso and the gang try to repair a reef by replacing bleached corals, but a pod of playful dolphins make mischief for them until they discover that helping can be fun too.
42	42	"The Octonauts and the Eel Ordeal"	Dashi	1 February 2011	19 March 2011
In a rare journey into fresh waters (a river), the Octonauts follow some migrating eels and help an injured eel on his difficult journey when he gets stranded from the others.
43	43	"The Octonauts and the Marine Iguanas"	Dashi; Kwazii	2 February 2011	13 March 2011
The team are preparing for a feast of red seaweed on the Galápagos Islands but a trio of salt-sneezing marine iguanas raid the Octopod and eat it all!
44	44	"The Octonauts and the Dwarf Lanternshark"	Barnacles	3 February 2011	12 March 2011
Down in the darkness of the ocean deep, Peso and the Octonauts must help a tiny, injured dwarf lanternshark. But they have to find him first since he's so small!
45	45	"The Octonauts and the Pirate Parrotfish"	Kwazii	4 February 2011	TBA
Kwazii discovers Calico Jack's Parrot Island treasure map behind an old photo. While looking for the island they meet a parrotfish, who helps them clear away dense algae and hide from vicious moray eels.
46	46	"The Octonauts and the Electric Torpedo Ray"	Tweak (failed); Vegimals (chirped)	7 February 2011	5 March 2011
Some electric torpedo rays give the Octopod a jump-start when its batteries go flat during a trip to see Tweak's pal, Sandy the leatherback sea turtle.
47	47	"The Octonauts and the Crafty Cuttlefish"	Barnacles (Demonstration); Tunip	8 February 2011	27 February 2011
Captain Barnacles allows Tunip to use his Octo-compass. But when Tunip loses it, a cuttlefish takes it.
48	48	"The Octonauts and the Lost Lemon Shark"	Peso	9 February 2011	26 February 2011
The Octonauts look after a young lemon shark named Lemmy who has hurt his nose and can't find his way home.
49	49	"The Octonauts and the Humuhumunukunukuapua'a"	Dashi	10 February 2011	20 February 2011
The Octopod's waterworks become clogged with frightened reef triggerfish. The Octonauts must find a way to flush them out.
50	50	"The Octonauts and the Giant Spider Crab"	Barnacles	11 February 2011	19 February 2011
The Octonauts help a 100-year-old spider crab that has got his leg trapped in a giant clam whilst en route to his 100th birthday party. It turns out that Kwazii's afraid of spiders, but he still helps, even though he thought the spider crab was a real spider at first.

=== Series 2 (2012–13) ===
A second series of 22 episodes started on 19 November 2012 on the UK's CBeebies channel, but was halted with no explanation after 10 episodes, leading to criticism from viewers. Broadcasts resumed in March 2013, but stopped a week later (with the last 7 episodes still unaired). 5 of the remaining episodes were released in May 2013 and then the last 2 episodes were released in September 2013, just before the broadcast of series 3.

Written by: Ken Pontac, Rich Fogel, Jimmy Hibbert, Dean Stefan, Adam Peltzman, Billy Aronson, Danny Stack, Cydne Clark, Carin Greenberg, Allan Neuwirth, Nicky Phelan, Raye Lankford, Gabe Pulliam, Adam Idelson, Sam Dransfield, Davey Moore, and Steve Clark

No. overall	No. in series	Title	Octo-Alert sounded by	Original release date	Creature Report air date
51	1	"The Octonauts and the Colossal Squid"	Dashi	19 November 2012	30 September 2015
The Octopod is attacked by a colossal squid, which drags the ship down an abyssal trench, forcing Barnacles and Kwazii to make a perilous swim outside to confront the gigantic beast.
52	2	"The Octonauts and the Adélie Penguins"	Dashi	20 November 2012	22 September 2015
While Kwazii and Peso have their hands full babysitting a bunch of Adélie penguin chicks, Captain Barnacles must rescue the chicks' parents from a perilous sea storm!
53	3	"The Octonauts and the Coconut Crabs"	Kwazii	21 November 2012	29 September 2015
Kwazii finds a mysterious, unbreakable coconut, so the Octonauts seek out the help of some large, island-dwelling coconut crabs to open it.
54	4	"The Octonauts and the Great White Shark"	Peso	22 November 2012	28 September 2015
Peso must perform an emergency fin bandage on a hungry great white shark, but first they need to subdue the giant predator using a trick called 'tonic immobility'.
55	5	"The Octonauts and the Sea Snakes"	Peso	23 November 2012	24 September 2015
It's sea snakes on the Octopod when a venomous sea krait lays her eggs in the garden pod, just as Captain Barnacles has to navigate the ship past a treacherous whirlpool.
56	6	"The Octonauts and the Bowhead Whales"	Barnacles	26 November 2012	1 October 2015
Captain Barnacles' narwhal friends (see Series 1, episode 17) are trapped under the Arctic ice. After failing to rescue them with the GUP-C's icebreaker and the GUP-D's drill, they enlist the help of some bowhead whales whose massive heads can break through thick ice.
57	7	"The Octonauts and the Jawfish"	Barnacles	27 November 2012	16 November 2015
A jawfish father has lost the eggs he was brooding and the Octonauts must bring them safely back to him!
58	8	"The Octonauts and the Porcupine Puffer"	Peso	28 November 2012	17 November 2015
The Octonauts venture inside a whale shark again (see Series 1, episode 1), this time they need to rescue a porcupine puffer fish named Puffy before it's too late!
59	9	"The Octonauts and the Damselfish"	Barnacles	29 November 2012	2 October 2015
Some algae-eating fish need help dealing with damselfish that chase them off the algae they are farming.
60	10	"The Octonauts and the Scared Sperm Whale"	Barnacles	30 November 2012	18 November 2015
Peso tries to help a young timid sperm whale named Simon to overcome his fear of deep diving, an ability Captain Barnacles and Kwazii must use their brains later to rescue Peso when he gets caught by a giant clam on the seabed.
61	11	"The Octonauts and the Long-armed Squid"	Peso	11 March 2013	11 March 2013
Peso and Kwazii search a creepy shipwreck in the midnight zone, looking for an injured creature that their friend the vampire squid (see Series 1, episode 28) has heard moaning in the dark. Peso soon finds an injured anglerfish but the real source of the moaning turns out to be a long-armed squid, a strange ghostly white creature with elbows in his extraordinarily long tentacles, one of which has become trapped in the timbers of the wreck.
62	12	"The Octonauts and the Fiddler Crabs"	Barnacles	12 March 2013	12 March 2013
The Octopod's periscope breaks off during a storm and lands up on a beach, lost amongst other marine debris. The Octonauts clean up the beach whilst searching for the periscope, but a resident colony of fiddler crabs mistake the GUP-D and its claw gestures for a hostile giant crab and attack. The GUP-D goes haywire with a fiddler crab at the controls and burrows under the beach causing a sinkhole to appear which almost swallows them all up. In the end, the crabs fill the hole with the sand balls they regurgitate whilst feeding.
63	13	"The Octonauts and the Manta Rays"	Dashi	13 March 2013	13 March 2013
A young manta ray named Mirelle needs help finding the secret manta ray feeding grounds. But when she and the Octonauts finally locate it, they find themselves caught in the middle of a feeding frenzy!
64	14	"The Octonauts and the Swashbuckling Swordfish" "The Octonauts and the Flying Swords" (US title)	Dashi	14 March 2013	14 March 2013
When Kwazii sees what seem to be three flying swords under the Pirate's Moon, he embarks on a quest to find the Sword of the Pirate King, which legend says is on a wreck guarded by magical flying swords. The three "flying swords" turn out to have been three swordfish, which love jumping out of the water, but the pirate sword proves to be real. Meanwhile, the others are led on a wild goose chase into a kelp forest following the pirate wreck's drifting figurehead, a carving of a pirate cat, which they mistake for Kwazii.
65	15	"The Octonauts and the Triggerfish"	Barnacles	15 March 2013	15 March 2013
The Octonauts' floating temperature sensors alert them to a risk of waterspouts due to a rise in sea surface temperature so they decide to retrieve the devices for safe keeping. But Kwazii gets into an argument with a possessive triggerfish named Trixie which has adopted one of the devices as its home, and they both get carried away by a waterspout. Kwazii ends up having to defend the fish from a seabird and a swordfish who want to eat her. Luckily the characteristic grunting sounds that triggerfish make when distressed enables the other Octonauts to locate them.
66	16	"The Octonauts and the Mimic Octopus"	Kwazii	13 May 2013	13 May 2013
Peso is gathering red algae to cure the sick vegimals but needs the shapeshifting skills of a mimic octopus named Mortamor to scare off a moray eel by using its striped tentacles to pretend to be a group of venomous sea snakes!
67	17	"Octonauts and the Lionfish"	Peso	14 May 2013	14 May 2013
Invasive lionfish are damaging coral reefs in the Atlantic Ocean and need taking back to their native Pacific Ocean so the Octonauts must use the Octopod to transport them to their native habitat.
68	18	"The Octonauts and the Leafy Sea Dragons"	Kwazii	15 May 2013	15 May 2013
When some leafy sea dragons accidentally get into the Octopod, the Octonauts must find them before they end up in Kwazii's stew!
69	19	"The Octonauts and the Manatees"	Barnacles	16 May 2013	16 May 2013
After his Gup is struck by lightning, Captain Barnacles gets trapped by a giant clam but doesn't call for help as he wants the others to go help some manatees at risk from a thunderstorm.
70	20	"The Octonauts and the Saltwater Crocodile"	Dashi	17 May 2013	17 May 2013
An enormous Australian saltwater crocodile is lost in the Antarctic Ocean and the Octonauts must bring him home without anyone getting hurt.
71	21	"The Octonauts and the Humphead Parrotfish"	Dashi	2 September 2013	2 September 2013
The Octonauts use magnets and a rock-chomping humphead parrotfish named Hatty to try to stop a large meteor that's heading towards the Octopod.
72	22	"The Octonauts and the Gulper Eels"	Dashi	3 September 2013	3 September 2013
Hungry gulper eel brothers as well as undersea tremors threaten Inkling and Kwazii and get trapped by boulders. So, Dashi uses Tweak's newly built "Octo Mach-Suit" to rescue them.

=== Series 3 (2013–15) ===
A third series of 20 episodes started being broadcast by CBeebies on 4 September 2013.

Written by: Gabe Pulliam, Carin Greenberg, Adam Idelson, Adam Peltzman, Allan Neuwirth, Billy Aronson, Danny Stack, Davey Moore, Dean Stefan, Jimmy Hibbert, Ken Pontac, Nicky Phelan, Raye Lankford, Rich Fogel, Samuel Dransfield, Steve Clark, and Cydne Clark

No. overall	No. in series	Title	Octo-Alert sounded by	Original release date
73	1	"The Octonauts and the Siphonophore"	Peso	4 September 2013
Kwazii and Dashi become entangled in a strange deep-sea creature - a siphonophore - and when a geyser blasts it toward the surface, the Octonauts must stop its ascent before it fatally bursts.
74	2	"The Octonauts and the Water Bear"	Barnacles	5 September 2013
The Octonauts venture into a dangerous red-hot lava tube to rescue a teeny tiny water bear, who doesn't mind the heat at all.
75	3	"The Octonauts and the Cone Snail"	Shellington	6 September 2013
Only Peso can save the day when a cone snail invades the Octopod and tranquilizes the crew one by one with his dangerous venom-filled harpoons, turning them into googly-eyed Octonauts except Peso.
76	4	"The Octonauts and the Artificial Reef"	Dashi	9 September 2013
When an underwater hurricane destroys a small reef, which a frogfish and other creatures depend on, Tweak and her crew must convert the recently destroyed Gup-F into an artificial reef before the second stage of the hurricane strikes!
77	5	"The Octonauts and the Humpback Whales"	Barnacles	10 September 2013
When a sardine swallows the key to a treasure chest, a humpback whale helps Kwazii track her down.
78	6	"The Octonauts and the Pelicans"	Kwazii	11 September 2013
When a floating garbage patch endangers a flock of pelicans and other sea creatures, the Octonauts and the birds work together to clean it up.
79	7	"The Octonauts and the Sea Pigs"	Kwazii	12 September 2013
The Octonauts must stop a huge herd of sea pigs before they march blindly into the Mariana Trench - where there will be no access to food. But things get chaotic eventually when Tunip goes missing!
80	8	"The Octonauts and the Yeti Crab"	Tweak	13 September 2013
As Tweak tests the Gup-X deep down in the Midnight Zone, a yeti crab cuts a vital electrical wire in the ship and cuts off all power, endangering himself and the Octonauts.
81	9	"The Octonauts and the Barracudas"	Dashi	10 March 2014
Shellington and the Vegimals are on a mission to replant a mangrove forest that is put in peril by a school of toothy barracudas.
82	10	"The Octonauts and the Duck-Billed Platypus"	Kwazii	11 March 2014
While rescuing river creatures after a storm, the Octonauts find a strange egg and come under attack by platypuses.
83	11	"The Octonauts and the Sea Skaters"	Dashi	12 March 2014
When Kwazii gets lost at sea aboard the tiny octo-ski, he meets a flotilla of even tinier sea skaters, the only insects of the ocean. But when the Octopod gets covered in plankton by giant waves and the Octo-Hatch won't open, Barnacles and the rest must save their ship once again!
84	12	"The Octonauts and the Mudskippers"	Barnacles	13 March 2014
The Octonauts attempt to keep the peace amongst a trio of mudskippers whose home has been flooded.
85	13	"The Octonauts and the Harbour Seal"	Dashi	14 March 2014
When Peso's patient, a remora, mysteriously disappears, the Octonauts enlist a unique undersea detective - a harbour seal.
86	14	"The Octonauts and the Lion's Mane Jellyfish"	Peso	17 March 2014
Whilst Tweak and Tunip are doing maintenance on the Octopods bubble engine, and enormous lion's mane jellyfish gets his very long tentacles tangled in the entire octopod after being pulled in from Tweak refilling the engine with water, which then floods the entire octopod.
87	15	"The Octonauts and the Red Rock Crabs"	Dashi	18 March 2014
Shellington and the others round up some lost crabs and marine iguanas that have gotten marooned on an island far too cold for them and take them home to the Galápagos Islands.
88	16	"The Octonauts and the Sea Sponge"	Peso	19 March 2014
Examining a sick sea sponge, Peso is surprised to discover that all sorts of creatures live inside her, treating her like a hotel, a behavior known as commensalism.
89	17	"The Octonauts and the Immortal Jellyfish"	Tunip	20 March 2014
While caring for sea creatures, Peso discovers an adult immortal jellyfish named Dorian that changes into a baby when he was scared by predators. Captain Barnacles, Kwazii, and Peso guard Dorian at a distant reef, so Shellington rushes to photograph him damaging the GUP-E and booster packs in the process.
90	18	"The Octonauts and the Urchin Invasion"	Kwazii	21 March 2014
Kelp-eating red sea urchins attack a kelp forest. The Octonauts are helped by Shellington's sister, Pearl, another sea otter and scientist, and her newborn son, Periwinkle.
91	19	"The Octonauts and the Hammerhead Sharks"	Dashi	21 September 2015
When the day turns dark, the Octonauts study a group of baby hammerhead sharks as they hunt.
92	20	"The Octonauts and the Loggerhead Sea Turtle"	Tweak	22 September 2015
After an undersea tremor separates the Gup-X and its crew, Barnacles seeks guidance from a mysterious sea turtle called a loggerhead.

=== Series 4 (2015–17) ===
A fourth series of 24 episodes started being broadcast by CBeebies on 23 September 2015 and ended 27 October 2017. The episodes were released on Netflix on 15 October 2018.

Written by: Gabe Pulliam, Gordon Bressack, Kevin Burke, Nicole Dubuc, Rich Fogel, Kevin Hopps, Charlie Howell, Mark Huckerby, Adam Idelson, Sam Morrison, Nick Ostler, Kevin Seccia, Scott Sonneborn, Dean Stefan, Len Uhley, Greg Weisman, and Chris Wyatt.

No. overall	No. in series	Title	Octo-Alert sounded by	Original release date
93	1	"The Octonauts and the Poison Dart Frogs"	Barnacles	23 September 2015
The Octonauts find out about poison dart frogs after a dangerous tidal bore sweeps up the Amazon River, depositing all the fish high up in the trees! Thankfully, Tweak's new GUP, the GUP-H, was ready to help.
94	2	"The Octonauts and the Hidden Lake"	Barnacles	24 September 2015
When Barnacles, Kwazii, Peso, and Shellington find a mysterious hidden lake underneath Antarctica, Shellington is eager to find some new undiscovered creatures living in the red water. But why is the lake red? And are there actually any creatures living down so deep in the ice?
95	3	"The Octonauts and the Octopod Mystery"	Barnacles	25 September 2015
After the Octopod breaks down, Tweak knows that the only way to get the new part that she needs is to take a trip to the old Octopod. But they may not be alone in their abandoned ship... but they find that a giant Pacific octopus is living there!
96	4	"The Octonauts and the Baby Sea Turtles"	Dashi	28 September 2015
As newborn baby sea turtles make their way to the ocean, the Octonauts must help them avoid predators when a large wave threatens the island where the precious eggs are buried - not that they'll admit it!
97	5	"The Octonauts and the Walrus Pups"	Orson and Ursa	29 September 2015
Captain Barnacles' niece and nephew Ursa and Orson are going to get their Polar Scout Badges when they spot three walrus pups on a drifting floe which is on a crash-course with two icebergs. Will Captain Barnacles be able to save them and finally earn the Walrus Rescue Badge - the only one he hasn't got?
98	6	"The Octonauts and the Mantis Shrimp"	Two Mantis shrimps (accidentally)	30 September 2015
The Octonauts must get two mantis shrimp to stop fighting before their powerful claw strikes destroy the Octopod.
99	7	"The Octonauts and the Loneliest Whale"	Dashi	1 October 2015
The Octonauts follow a strange song to a lonely humpback whale who is alone because he does not sound like the other whales! They have to help him because if nobody understands him, he won't find the way to the feeding ground.
100	8	"The Octonauts and the Tree Lobsters"	Barnacles	2 October 2015
A storm washes Peso onto a mysterious, rocky island where he meets a band of lobster-like insects thought to be extinct. But he and the Octonauts must catch a baby tree lobster that ended up in the Octopod and bring him back to Ball's Pyramid.
101	9	"The Octonauts and the Convict Fish"	Barnacles	14 December 2015
The Octonauts evacuate the creatures living around a reef before a large archway collapses, but one stubborn convict fish refuses to move from her burrow!
102	10	"The Octonauts and the Emperor Penguins"	Barnacles	16 December 2015
The Octonauts journey across a dangerous expanse of ice to help a penguin mother get back to her family, but they lose contact along the way.
103	11	"The Octonauts and the Baby Gator"	Barnacles	26 October 2017
A baby alligator named Nipper stows away on the Gup K. Now the Octonauts must rescue him after he and Kwazii are swept out to sea.
104	12	"The Octonauts and the Bomber Worms"	Barnacles	23 October 2017
While diving down to the Midnight Zone, the Octonauts are attacked by bomber worms and are enlisted to rescue an injured member of their troop.
105	13	"The Octonauts and the Crawfish"	Barnacles	3 December 2016
When a population of crawfish is stricken by illness, the Octonauts race to find a cure.
106	14	"The Octonauts and the Surfing Snails"	Barnacles	6 September 2017
When surfing snails are swept out to sea, it's up to Dashi and the Octonauts to save them.
107	15	"The Octonauts and the Flamingos"	Barnacles	4 December 2016
The Octonauts find a lost flamingo chick separated from his family and they have to return him there before hungry alligators do!
108	16	"The Octonauts and Operation Cooperation"	A carrot	27 September 2017
After Shellington crashes the GUP-D, 3 times in a row, he and Kwazii team up with moray eels and groupers to help pick up the pieces and fix the vehicle before daylight occurs.
109	17	"The Octonauts and the Kelp Monster Mystery"	Barnacles (ambiguous)	24 October 2017
Dashi teams up with her little sister Koshi to help the Octonauts solve a mysterious disappearance in the kelp forest.
110	18	"The Octonauts and the Yellow-Bellied Sea Snakes"	Kwazii	13 September 2017
When Peso gets stranded on a beach with a mass of venomous snakes after a terrible storm, one of the yellow-bellied snakes has a splinter of driftwood stuck in her scales, and Peso has a broken flipper (According to the UK version, meanwhile the US Version indicates that he got stung). Now the Octonauts must somehow get them back to the ocean by cooling them off with water and building a swimming pool and save Peso!
111	19	"The Octonauts and the Coconut Crisis"	Clarence the coconut crab	25 October 2017
Kwazii takes a vacation on Coconut Island where he gets hit by some coconuts. Then he and the Octonauts must help their old friends the coconut crabs discover who's stealing all their coconuts.
112	20	"The Octonauts and the Coelacanth"	Barnacles	29 May 2017
While exploring a dark and spooky cave, The Octonauts find a strange fossil of a powerful prehistoric fish... but he may be more than just a fossil!
113	21	"The Octonauts and the Tiger Shark"	Kwazii	27 May 2017
When a hungry tiger shark whose name is Tom eats the camera that Tweak's leatherback sea turtle friend Sandy gets in the Octopod, she and the Octonauts must rescue her before he eats everything in his path.
114	22	"The Octonauts and the Hippos"	Shellington (in his sleep)	20 September 2017
Trying to return home from a mission along an African river, the Octonauts have trouble getting past a gang of large, mud-splatting, territorial hippos.
115	23	"The Octonauts and the Spinner Dolphins"	Barnacles	27 October 2017
The Octonauts struggle to save a pod of spinner dolphins who seem to be just swimming in their sleep.
116	24	"The Octonauts and the Sunfish"	Dashi	28 May 2017
When a huge sunfish by the name of Sonny enters the GUP-E, Peso, and Kwazii must somehow get the large fish out of the Gup. Eventually, they find out it's a sunfish by the name of Sonny; a species of fish with no fins.

=== Series 5 (2023–27) ===
A fifth series of 27 episodes started being broadcast on CBeebies on 27 March 2023. All other episodes were released in Chinese only before debuting in September 2026 on Amazon Prime Video.

No. overall	No. in series	Title	Octo-Alert sounded by	Original release date
117	1	"The Octonauts and the Bluefin Tuna"	Kwazii	27 March 2023
After encountering an Atlantic bluefin tuna straggle behind her school after getting a fish hook caught in her mouth, the Octonauts have to deploy the newly-constructed Gup-R to get her to the breeding grounds so she can lay her eggs before breeding season ends.
118	2	"The Octonauts and the Blue Whale Rescue"	Kwazii	28 March 2023
On an early morning monster hunt, Kwazii encounters a blue whale with a severe tail injury and calls all hands on deck to help the poor ocean giant before he sinks and drowns.
119	3	"The Octonauts and the Whales of Mystery"	Shellington	29 March 2023
After a surprise collision with a mysterious creature on their way back from a late-night mission, Dashi and Shellington set off to find who they hit, with Peso and Tunip along to help treat any potential injuries.
120	4	"The Octonauts and the Ghost Ship"	Barnacles	30 March 2023
Barnacles, Kwazii, Peso, and Shellington encounter a decrepit ship while on ocean cleanup duty, and a colony of literal barnacles who need to get somewhere warmer.
121	5	"The Octonauts and the Feeding Frenzy"	Peso	31 March 2023
Dashi and Shellington accidentally start a feeding frenzy when their fish biscuits get loose and rile up the local reef sharks, and the others have to work fast before one of the hungry predators accidentally takes a big bite out of either.
122	6	"The Octonauts and the Sawfish"	Kwazii (accidentally)	18 September 2026
Kwazii ends up contracting a particularly bad case of the hiccups, forcing him and Peso to follow along with an old sawfish up a river to find the cure.
123	7	"The Octonauts and the Nautilus"	Kwazii	19 September 2026
While out on a monster hunt, Kwazii encounters an eccentric nautilus who loves a good adventure, but the two of them both get more than what they bargained for when they team up to find a particular beast.
124	8	"The Octonauts and the Grey Whales"	Dashi	20 September 2026
After a grey whale baby shows up earlier than expected and completely alone, the Octonauts divide and conquer to find the little fella's mother.
125	9	"The Octonauts and the Flying Squid"	Shellington	21 September 2026
While out on the hunt for treasure, Barnacles, Kwazii, and Peso encounter a flying squid in Calico Jack's boat, and the search is on to find the missing pirate.
126	10	"The Octonauts and the Sea Lions"	Peso	22 September 2026
While out to set up some buoys to warn an island of sea lions about incoming big waves, Dashi gets stuck with one inside a cave, with the others having to wrok fast before the waves get too rough.
127	11	"The Octonauts and the Hawksbill Sea Turtle"	Barnacles	23 September 2026
While out tending to the locals of the Great Barrier Reef during a massive heatwave, a trail of sea sponge carnage eventually leads Barnacles, Kwazii, and Peso to an overheated hawksbill sea turtle.
128	12	"The Octonauts and the Wood Eating Catfish"	Kwazii	24 September 2026
After coming home to find Kwazii getting his leg bandaged, Kwazii began regaling the tale of how he went through hell and back to help Calico Jack try and get his new peg leg before a determined panaque eats it for a snack.
129	13	"The Octonauts and the Seven Sea Squirts"	Peso	25 September 2026
The crew sets out to reassemble a legendary group of sea squirts to combat an increase in algae blooms in harbor cove.
130	14	"The Octonauts and the Bullfrogs"	Barnacles	26 September 2026
The Vegimals are desperate to ensure that they pass Captain Barnacles' annual Octopod inspection after several failures, but them accidentally bringing a colony of bullfrogs aboard the ship threatens their chances.
131	15	"The Octonauts and the Giant Sea Spider"	Professor Natquik	2 October 2026
Suffering from a severe bought of cabin fever while waiting out a storm after an antarctic supply run for Professor Natquik, Kwazii convinces Tweak and Shellington to explore to find something interesting... though the arachnophobic pirate cat isn't particularly happy that the creatures they decided on finding were sea spiders.
132	16	"The Octonauts and the Great Octo-Bot Rescue"	Peso	4 October 2026
An accident aboard the Deep Sea Octo-Lab causes the Vegi-Bot to end up under a boiling hot sulfur lake, forcing Kwazii to dive in after it in an Octo-Max Suit... before it succumbs to the extreme environment.
133	17	"The Octonauts and the Axolotl"	Barnacles	5 October 2026
As Barnacles and Kwazii begin checking on the jungle lakes in southern Mexico, they find a pair of axolotls in dire need of a new home, though a new problem keeps coming at them at every single turn.
134	18	"The Octonauts and the Beavers"	Kwazii	11 October 2026
As Barnacles, Kwazii, and Shellington go to study a salmon run, they find that the stream the salmon need to reach their birthplace has dried up entirely, requiring the help of the same beavers that taught Tweak a good portion of her skills.
135	19	"The Octonauts and the Zombie Worms"	Peso	12 October 2026
A series of electrical failures aboard the Deep Sea Octo-Lab has the entire crew deployed to investigate... though it very quickly turns into a race against time to prevent the culprits from causing the entire thing to flood.
136	20	"The Octonauts and the Mud Volcanoes"	Tweak	18 October 2026
Dashi and Shellington get caught up in a series of eruptions from the local mud volcanoes as they try to find a home for a displaced Pompeii worm.
137	21	"The Octonauts and the Tiger Fish and Blind Shrimp"	Barnacles	19 October 2026
After an accident involving a water filter on the Gup-W, Kwazii has the help a pistol shrimp find his missing watchman goby before he gets eaten by predators.
138	22	"The Octonauts and the Fish Mouth Louse"	Kwazii	2 November 2026
A red snapper loses his tongue louse after getting swept up in a waterspout, and the entire crew is deployed to find the tiny creature before he gets eaten and his snapper partner starves to death.
139	23	"The Octonauts and the Deep Ocean Discovery"	Peso	4 November 2026
During their first visit to the Octopod, Pearl and Periwinkle join Shellington to release an Octo-Drifter in a deep ocean current to track it. Unfortunately, they end up trapped in it as well, forcing the rest of the crew to mount a search effort.
140	24	"The Octonauts and the Silver Sea"	Shellington	2 December 2026
After Kwazii and Peso run afoul of the so-called "milky sea", the group discovers them to be a colony of bioluminescent microbes and have to do everything they can to ensure an incoming school of sardines don't turn into instant targets from swimming through it.
141	25	"The Octonauts and the Bicolour Fangblenny"	Barnacles	3 December 2026
Kwazii and Tweak find that an underwater cleaning station in Australia has been plagued by a mysterious biting fish that is scaring off their clients, but the entire crew quickly finds that this fish is not to be trifled with.
142	26	"The Octonauts and the Scaly-Foot Snail"	Kwazii	14 February 2027
Tweak is de-rusting the Octopod using a special vinegar solution that smells so horrendous the others abandon ship to the Deep Sea Octo-Lab until she's done. As they struggle to make do, however, the others find a bigger crisis on their hands that requires help from a new creature friend.
143	27	"The Octonauts and the Giant Salamander"	Dashi	30 September 2026
The entire crew is sent up the Yangtze when Professor Inkling's old friend, Min the Mapmaker, sends out an S.O.S., and quickly find themselves helping a Chinese giant salamander ensure his eggs survive long enough to hatch.

== Specials ==
The specials are double-length episodes that are first broadcast during the Christmas, New Year, or Memorial Day periods before being repeated alongside regular episodes.

No.	Title	Octo-Alert sounded by	Original release date
1	"Octonauts and the Great Penguin Race"	Kwazii	13 December 2010
Peso is going home to Antarctica to watch an annual penguin triathlon, the Iron Clam Competition, but learns to his dismay that his little brother Pinto has entered him in it. With the Octonauts cheering him on, Peso will have to slide, dive and swim his way to victory, against the annual athletic winner, Hugo.
2	"Octonauts and the Great Christmas Rescue"	Inkling	1 December 2011
The Octonauts travel for Christmas to Professor Inkling's childhood home, a seamount, but soon get involved in a rescue mission when a rockslide endangers a rare 500-year-old golden coral and traps Professor Inkling's nephew Squirt. They also learn about Christmas tree worms which live in holes in rocks. Crucial to completing the mission is the new heavy-duty vehicle GUP-X which Tweak has built as an early present for Captain Barnacles.
3	"Octonauts and the Amazon Adventure"	Kwazii	1 January 2013
Kwazii enters a shipwreck to get Calico Jack's map to an underwater city of gold. This leads the Octonauts up the Amazon River, past parrots, freshwater stingrays, caiman and manatees. But a falling tree traps the GUP-A, and a tidal bore comes up the river, scattering the Octonauts. Captain Barnacles looks for the others with the aid of a river dolphin and her echolocation abilities. The Octonauts help an electric eel, a stranded arapaima, and get chased by piranhas. But a panaque frees the trapped GUP-A. Meanwhile, Kwazii has been saved by Calico Jack who turns out to be alive but lost his ship after an attack by fire ants and an anaconda. His incomplete map had led him in circles, but Kwazii's piece completes it so they can finish the quest. After being blocked by hostile capybaras, they are reunited with the others in time to fight off more anacondas. Finally, the "city of gold" turns out to be a colony of golden freshwater sponges in the bottom of a pool.
4	"Octonauts and the Mariana Trench Adventure"	Barnacles	27 May 2013
The Octonauts assemble Tweak's new Deep Sea Octolab and lower it to the deepest part of the ocean, the Mariana Trench, where Shellington and Dashi intend to study the sea life. Whilst the Octonauts are setting up the base it is invaded by some giant isopods and other creatures which are looking for a new hydrothermal vent to live around (and accidentally knocking out the power source in the process). They also observe some sea cucumbers and luminous sea stars, and whilst chasing the Octobots and the Vegebot after a power surge causes them to go out of control, Kwazii has to avoid undersea mud volcanoes which have created a lake of hot mud on the seafloor and lava.
5	"Octonauts and a Very Vegimal Christmas"	Tunip (thrice; only Vegimals attend)	17 December 2013
When nearly all of the Octonauts are trapped in a dangerous sentient blob of marine mucilage, the only Octonauts not trapped in the blob, Tunip, the solo Octonaut and the Vegimals, must step up and build a new GUP called the GUP-V to rescue the crew in time for their Christmas meal.
6	"Octonauts and the Over, Under Adventure"	Shellington	14 March 2014
The Octonauts' mission to explore Antarctica during which they marvel at sea tulips and hourglass dolphins becomes a desperate rescue as a group of sea stars and urchins are threatened by a brinicle - a rare underwater icicle that can freeze creatures on the sea bed. So the crew use the recently built GUP-S to save the day, with the help of a Weddell seal.
7	"Octonauts and the Great Arctic Adventure"	Barnacles	17 December 2014
While the Octopod is at the base for repairs, the Octonauts (except for Inkling, Tweak, and Tunip) take vacations for themselves. Captain Barnacles and Peso visit his sister Bianca at her den and helps her two cubs Orson and Ursa to find the sea ice during the springtime migration and call on the rest of the Octonauts to rescue fellow polar bears from Norway, Canada, Greenland, Alaska, and Russia as their ice floe was melting.
8	"Octonauts and Operation Deep Freeze"	Barnacles	15 December 2015
Captain Barnacles runs into an old friend - an Arctic fox named Professor Natquik - in Antarctica. They must work together with the other Octonauts to prevent a group of penguins from falling into an ice chasm.
9	"Octonauts and the Great Swamp Search"	Barnacles	3 December 2016
Tweak and the Octonauts go to the Everglades to visit her dad, Ranger Marsh, and help him rescue some non-native creatures before a storm hits. The team's recently built GUP-K is also there to save the day when a fire spreads.
10	"Octonauts and the Caves of Sac Actun"	Dashi	14 August 2020
The Octonauts embark on an underwater adventure navigating a set of challenging underwater caves, with help from a new friend, to help a small octopus return home to the Caribbean Sea.
11	"Octonauts and the Great Barrier Reef"	Barnacles	13 October 2020
In this musical special the Octonauts must find a way to hold back hungry swarms of crown-of-thorns starfish to save a new friend's fragile reef home.
12	"Octonauts and the Ring of Fire"	Tweak and Kwazii	30 March 2021
When red-hot volcanoes start a chain reaction of disasters across the ocean, the Octonauts must work together to face their biggest challenge yet. They use the recently created Z-GUPs, (the Z1, Z2, Z3, Z4 and Z5), to save many creatures, including an Omura's whale, some chinstrap penguins, and many more creatures from various volcanoes and one giant volcano.
