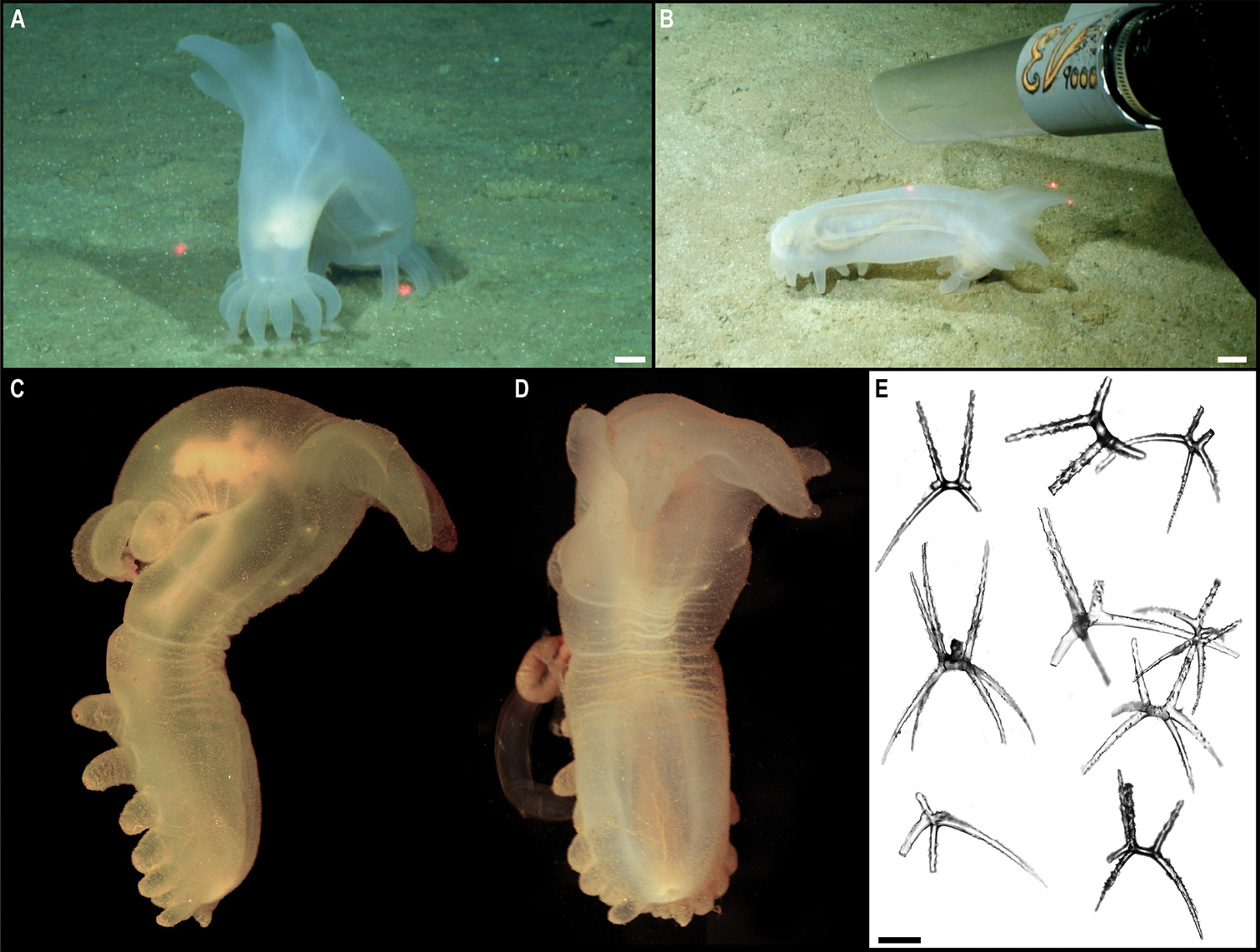
- Peniagone vitrea

Scientific classification
- Kingdom: Animalia
- Phylum: Echinodermata
- Class: Holothuroidea
- Order: Elasipodida
- Family: Elpidiidae
- Genus: Peniagone
- Species: P. vitrea

Binomial name
- Peniagone vitrea Théel, 1882

Synonyms
- Peniagone setosa Ludwig, 1893

= Peniagone vitrea =

Species of sea cucumber

Peniagone vitrea is a species of deep-sea swimming sea cucumber in the family Elpidiidae. It is a detritivore and is found in the northern Pacific Ocean at abyssal depths. It was first described by the Swedish zoologist Hjalmar Théel in 1879, being one of the many deep sea animals discovered during the Challenger expedition of 1872–1876.

== Ecology ==
Peniagone vitrea is one of a number of echinoderm species that show great variations in population density. Researchers in one study found that, over a sixteen-year period, two deep sea holothurians, Elpidia minutissima and Peniagone vitrea, underwent a decline in density of the order of one to two magnitudes. It has been hypothesized that two factors that increase the likelihood of large swings in population are broadcast spawning and the possession of planktotrophic larvae. These factors provide a positive feedback loop so that once populations decline, recovery is very slow. When individual organisms are further apart, broadcast spawning is less likely to result in fertilisation and this means fewer larvae available for recruitment.
