= Elpidia minutissima =

Scientific classification
- Kingdom: Animalia
- Phylum: Echinodermata
- Class: Holothuroidea
- Order: Elasipodida
- Family: Elpidiidae
- Genus: Elpidia
- Species: E. minutissima

Binomial name
- Elpidia minutissima Belyaev, 1971

Species of sea cucumber

Elpidia minutissima is a species of deep-sea swimming sea cucumber in the family Elpidiidae. It is a detritivore and is found in the northern Pacific Ocean.

== Description ==
Specimens collected from the Aleutian Trench averaged 13 mm (0.5 in) in length and had three pairs of dorsal podia whereas specimens collected from Station M in the northeastern Pacific Ocean at a depth of about 4,000 metres (13,000 ft) had four pairs, two pairs on the dorsal surface and two pairs on the ventral surface, the hindermost of the ventral podia being shorter than the others. At times of low abundance, the average length of these sea cucumbers was similar to the specimens from the Aleutian Trench but at times of high abundance it increased to 25 mm (1.0 in). It is possible that these two populations are not in fact the same species.

== Ecology ==
Elpidia minutissima feeds on detritus on the seabed, the result of "marine snow" consisting of mucus, faeces and organic debris, that sink into the depths from surface waters. It plays an important part in the processing, utilization and redistribution of particles of organic material that has fallen to the sea bed.

Elpidia minutissima is one of a number of echinoderm species that show great variations in population density. Researchers in one study found that, over a sixteen-year period, two deep sea holothurians, E. minutissima and Peniagone vitrea, underwent a decline in density of the order of one to two magnitudes. It has been hypothesized that two factors that increase the likelihood of large swings in population are broadcast spawning and the possession of planktotrophic larvae. These factors provide a positive feedback loop so that once populations decline, recovery is very slow. When individual organisms are further apart, broadcast spawning is less likely to result in fertilisation and this means fewer larvae available for recruitment.
