= Creature Report =

Creature Report may refer to:

- Creature Report, the working title for Thor: Ragnarok during filming
- Creature Reports, short musical sequences on the animated children's television series Octonauts
