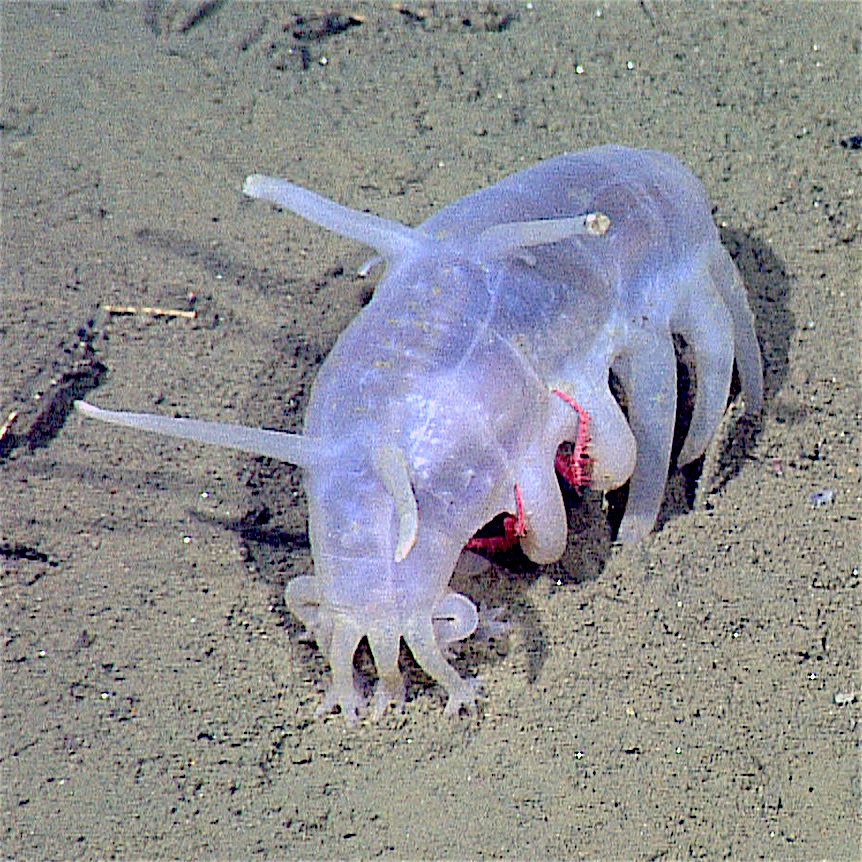
- Scotoplanes globosa and symbiotic lithodid crab
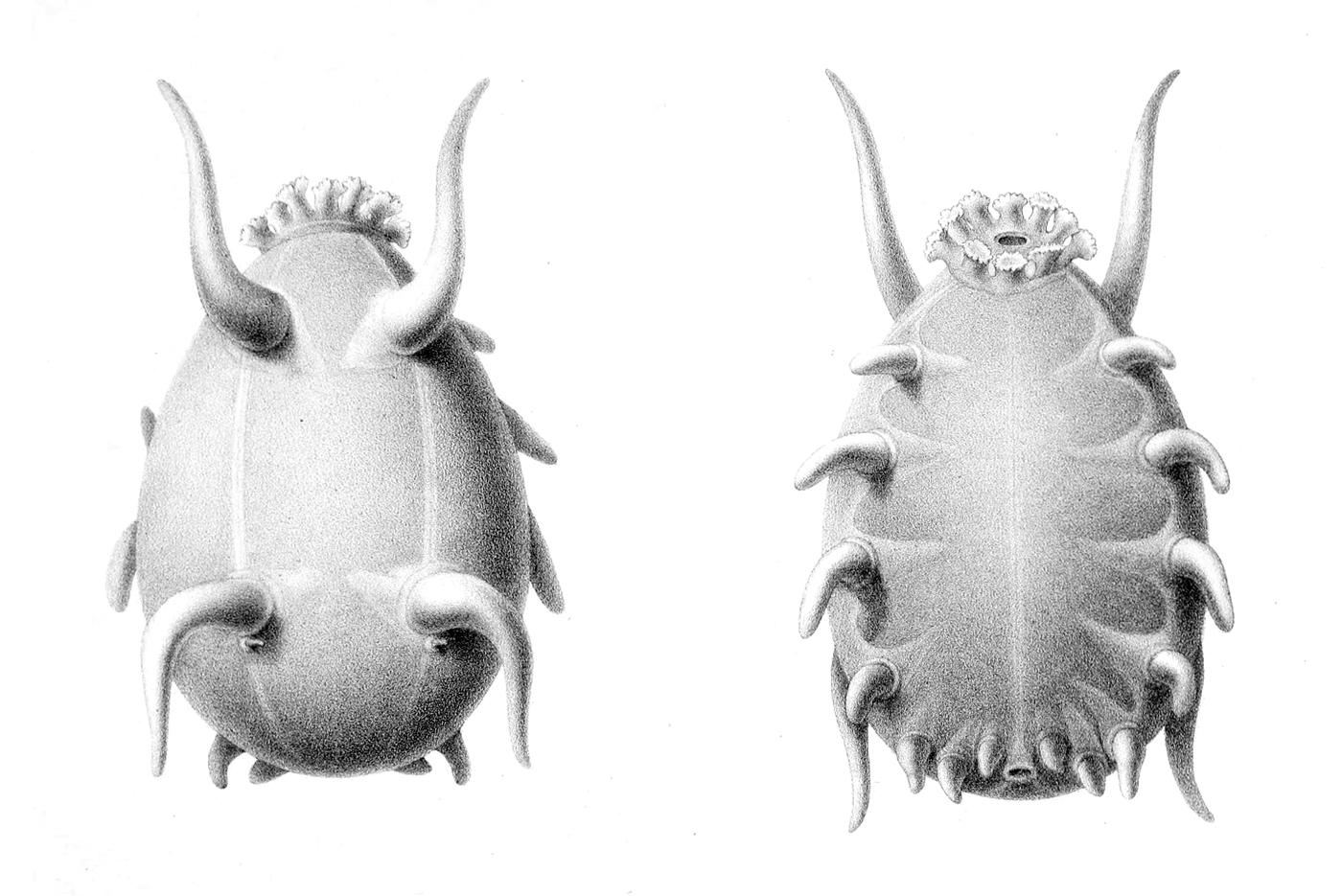
- Dorsal and ventral view

Conservation status
- Secure (NatureServe)

Scientific classification
- Kingdom: Animalia
- Phylum: Echinodermata
- Class: Holothuroidea
- Order: Elasipodida
- Family: Elpidiidae
- Genus: Scotoplanes
- Species: S. globosa

Binomial name
- Scotoplanes globosa (Théel, 1879)

Synonyms
- Elpidia globosa Théel, 1879

= Scotoplanes globosa =

Species of sea cucumber

Scotoplanes globosa, commonly known as the sea pig, is a species of sea cucumber that lives in the deep sea. It was first described by Hjalmar Théel, a Swedish scientist. Scotoplanes globosa, along with numerous other sea cucumbers were discovered by Théel during an expedition on HMS Challenger between the years of 1873-1876. Scotoplanes globosa was officially described in 1882, 6 to 9 years after its first sighting. Scotoplanes globosa is most closely related to the genus Peniagone.

== Ecology ==
Congregations of smaller Scotoplanes globosa are often observed on the ocean floor in groups of 10 to 30. However, groups of Scotoplanes globosa have been observed to be as many as 600 individuals in one congregation. A congregation of Scotoplanes globosa is called a "trawl". These groups of Scotoplanes globosa often appear to all be facing in one direction, into the ocean current. It is believed that this behavior aids S. globosa in the detection of the richest feeding sites. Scotoplanes globosa has also been observed to be the host of multiple deep-sea parasites, such as the small gastropods Stilapex and Crinolamia, and various parasitic crustaceans. These parasites typically bore small holes into the body wall of S. globosa. Scotoplanes globosa are also often accompanied by a symbiotic lithodid crab, Neolithodes diomedeae. It is believed that approximately 22% of Scotoplanes globosa are attended by at least one of these crabs. One possible theory is that these crabs latch onto S. globosa gaining access to nutrients and movement, while the host gets protection from parasites. At this time, scientists are unsure whether the relationship between S. globosa and N. diomedea is mutualistic or commensal.

== Anatomy ==
Scotoplanes globosa is typically 2 to 15 cm in length and appear to be a translucent white color. S. globosa are bilaterally symmetrical, covered in tube-like feet which are used in locomotion and possibly respiration. The tube-like structures found on top of the Scotoplanes globosa are also feet, as opposed to antennae. Scientists are still unsure whether these upper-tube-feet are used in locomotion or used as sensory accessories. They are quite buoyant and are easily displaced by strong currents. Scotoplanes globosa were found to contain only one gonad in both males and females, with evidence that gametogenesis occurred.

=== Locomotion ===
Scotoplanes globosa has a soft, round body with five-to-seven pairs of long, tube-like limbs extending from its body. S. globosa uses these limbs for locomotion. They "walk" along the ocean floor using muscle constrictions to push fluid in and out the tube feet cavities. Scotoplanes is the only genus of holothurians that have been observed to "walk" in this manner.

== Distribution and habitat ==
Scotoplanes globosa are found in almost all deep-sea regions in the world. Specifically, S. globosa live on the abyssal plain. They are commonly found off the coast of San Diego, as well as in the Arctic, Atlantic, Pacific, and Indian Oceans. Scotoplanes globosa typically live at depths of over 1,000 m (3,280 ft), and have been found in the deepest locations in the ocean, including the Kermadec Trench at a depth of 6,659 m (21,850 ft) and in the Philippine Trench at a depth of 9,997 m (32,800 ft) by the Galathea expedition in the 1950s. Scotoplanes globosa appear to prefer facing against the current, which helps them detect fresher and better foods.

== Diet ==
Scotoplanes globosa is a deposit feeder, eating detritus which has sunk to the ocean floor. S. globosa has been observed to strongly prefer consuming fresh, recently fallen (approximately within the last 100 days) sediments on the surface of the ocean floor as opposed to older sediments. These freshly-fallen sediments are more nutrient-rich. Scotoplanes globosa captures food through its mucus-covered tentacles which surround their mouth. S. globosa is also known to congregate around the carcasses of whales which have fallen to the seafloor. Lundsten et al.. (2010) determined that S. globosa find deep-sea whale carcasses by smell, as well as other nutrient-rich food sources; the extremely nutrient-rich whale carcasses also attract other deep-sea creatures in large numbers.
