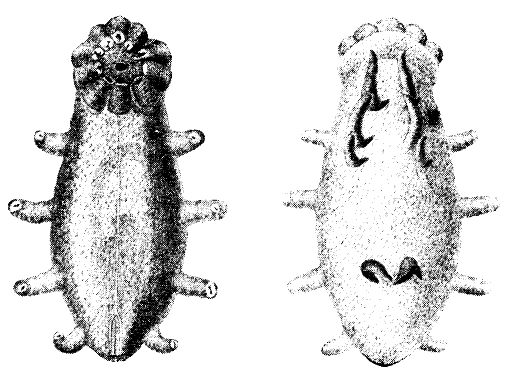
- Elpidia glacialis

Scientific classification
- Kingdom: Animalia
- Phylum: Echinodermata
- Class: Holothuroidea
- Order: Elasipodida
- Family: Elpidiidae
- Genus: Elpidia; Théel, 1882

Species
- See text

Synonyms
- Tutela Perrier R., 1896

= Elpidia =

Genus of sea cucumbers

Elpidia is a genus of deep-sea sea cucumbers. Members are characterised by their rod-shaped spicules which each have two pairs of obliquely placed horizontal arms and two vertical apophyses. There is a high degree of endemism in this genus with different species occupying different deep sea basins or regions.

== Species ==
The following species are recognised in the genus Elpidia:

- Elpidia adenensis Belyaev, 1971
- Elpidia antarctica Belyaev, 1971
- Elpidia atakama Belyaev, 1971
- Elpidia belyaevi Rogacheva, 2007
- Elpidia birsteini Belyaev, 1971
- Elpidia chilensis Belyaev, 1971
- Elpidia decapoda Belyaev, 1975
- Elpidia echinata (R. Perrier, 1896)
- Elpidia glacialis Théel, 1876
- Elpidia gracilis Belyaev, 1975
- Elpidia heckeri Baranova, 1989
- Elpidia javanica Belyaev, 1971
- Elpidia kermadecensis Hansen, 1956
- Elpidia kurilensis Baranova & Belyaev in Belyaev, 1971
- Elpidia lata Belyaev, 1975
- Elpidia longicirrata Belyaev, 1971
- Elpidia minutissima Belyaev, 1971
- Elpidia ninae Belyaev, 1975
- Elpidia solomonensis Hansen, 1956
- Elpidia soyoae Ogawa, Morita & Fujita, 2020
- Elpidia sundensis Hansen, 1956
- Elpidia theeli Hansen, 1956
- Elpidia uschakovi Belyaev, 1971
