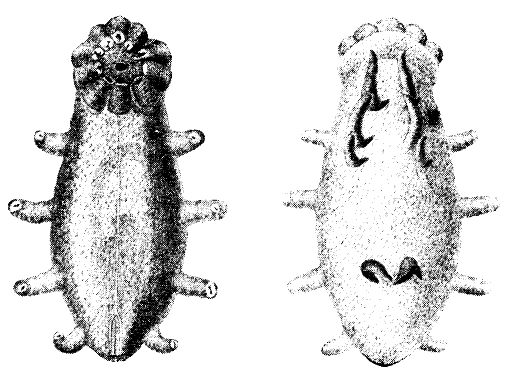

Scientific classification
- Kingdom: Animalia
- Phylum: Echinodermata
- Class: Holothuroidea
- Order: Elasipodida
- Family: Elpidiidae
- Genus: Elpidia
- Species: E. glacialis

Binomial name
- Elpidia glacialis Théel, 1876

= Elpidia glacialis =

Species of sea cucumber

Elpidia glacialis is a species of sea cucumber in the family Elpidiidae. It is found at abyssal depths in the Arctic Ocean, the Barents Sea, the Kara Sea and the North Atlantic Ocean. It was first described in 1876 by the Swedish zoologist Johan Hjalmar Théel after he had collected specimens while accompanying the explorer Adolf Erik Nordenskiöld on an expedition attempting to find the Northeast Passage.

== Ecology ==
In a study in the Greenland Sea, E. glacialis occurred on the lower slopes of the continental shelf at depths of about 2,700 metres (8,900 ft). Other organisms occupying the same habitat included the sea lily Bathycrinus sp., the sea spider Ascorhynchus abyssi, the brachiopod Waldheimia cranium and the zoanthid Epizoanthus sp. The sea lily and the sea cucumber were the dominant species present, perhaps because echinoderms can adopt various foraging strategies to suit the availability of food supplies.

In another study, in the central Arctic Ocean, it was found that most of the megafauna was only found within a certain range of depths, the only exceptions to this being E. glacialis and the predatory swimming snail Limacina helicina. The depth of the seabed in the study area of the Canada Basin was about 3,800 metres (12,500 ft). A further study, this time in a canyon in the western part of the Greenland Sea at a depth of about 3,200 metres (10,500 ft), found E. glacialis was sometimes present with an abundance of up to sixty individuals per 1 square metre (11 sq ft). It is a deposit feeder and its abundance may reflect differences in the availability of food in the sediment.
