= Ellipinion =

Scientific classification
- Kingdom: Animalia
- Phylum: Echinodermata
- Class: Holothuroidea
- Order: Elasipodida
- Family: Elpidiidae
- Genus: Ellipinion; Hérouard, 1923

Species
- See text

Genus of sea cucumbers

Ellipinion is a genus of deep-sea sea cucumbers in the family Elpidiidae. It was first described by the French marine biologist Edgard Hérouard in 1923.

== Species ==
The following species are recognised in the genus Ellipinion:

- Ellipinion alani Rogacheva, Gebruk & Alt, 2013
- Ellipinion albida (Théel, 1882)
- Ellipinion bucephalum Hansen, 1975
- Ellipinion delagei (Hérouard, 1896)
- Ellipinion facetum (Hansen, 1975)
- Ellipinion galatheae (Hansen, 1956)
- Ellipinion kumai (Mitsukuri, 1912)
- Ellipinion molle (Théel, 1879)
- Ellipinion papillosum (Théel, 1879)
- Ellipinion solidum Hansen, 1975
