= Octonauts =

British animated children's television series

- Genre: Children; Action; Adventure
- Based on: Octonauts series by Meomi: Vicki Wong & Michael C. Murphy
- Written by: Gabe Pulliam; Carin Greenberg; Allan C. Neuwirth
- Directed by: Darragh O'Connell; Henry Lenardin-Madden (uncredited)
- Creative director: Stephen Robinson
- Voices of: Simon Greenall; Rob Rackstraw; Paul Panting; Keith Wickham; Jo Wyatt; Teresa Gallagher; Michael C. Murphy
- Theme music composer: Darren Hendley
- Composer: Darren Hendley
- Countries of origin: United Kingdom; Ireland (series 1–4); Canada (series 5–present)
- Original language: English
- No. of series: 5
- No. of episodes: 143 + 12 specials (list of episodes)

Production
- Executive producers: Kurt Mueller; Stephanie Simpson; Cathal Gaffney; Darragh O'Connell (series 1–4); Jackie Edwards (CBeebies)
- Producers: Adam Idelson; Karen Ialacci; Gillian Higgins; Theresa Mayer; Julie Abecassis; Andrew Peters; Brian Gilmore
- Running time: 11 minutes; 23–72 minutes (specials)
- Production companies: Brown Bag Films (series 1–4); Mainframe Studios (series 5–present); Chorion (series 1); Sony Pictures Television Kids (Note: Credited as "Silvergate Media" until series 5.) (series 2–present)

Original release
- Network: CBeebies
- Release: 4 October 2010 – present

Related
- Octonauts: Above & Beyond; Octonauts: Journey to China

Octonauts is a British animated children's television series produced by Sony Pictures Television Kids for the BBC's CBeebies network. It is based on the children's books written by Meomi, the design team of Vicki Wong and Michael C. Murphy.

The show follows an underwater exploring crew made up of stylised anthropomorphic animals, a team of eight adventurers who live in an undersea base, the Octopod, from which they go on undersea adventures with the help of a fleet of aquatic vehicles. Although its technology is fictional, the exotic creatures and locations that the crew encounter are based on real marine animals. The show's subject matter has been compared to that of Star Trek and Thunderbirds blended with Jacques Cousteau.

The show was animated in Ireland by Brown Bag Films for its first four series. The show was renewed for a fifth series in 2018, with Canada's Mainframe Studios taking over animation work. A Netflix-original spinoff, subtitled Above & Beyond, was released In September 2021, and features the Octonauts venturing onto more land-based habitats of the natural world, Journey to China.

In March 2023, 5 new episodes under the original Octonauts branding and format were released via the BBC iPlayer.

== Characters ==
Left to right: Kwazii, Captain Barnacles and Peso

=== Main characters ===
- Barnacles (voiced by Simon Greenall; singing voice provided by Simon Foster) is a polar bear who is the captain of the Octonauts. He is skilled in piloting many vehicles and is strong enough to lift a giant clam. In the episode "The Caves of Sac Actun", it is revealed that Barnacles is claustrophobic.
- Kwazii (voiced by Rob Rackstraw) is a cat lieutenant and cryptozoologist who speaks in a Cockney accent. Kwazii is a daredevil cat with a mysterious pirate past. He believes in many sea monsters such as the Nackerwhack, Tri-Toothed-Terror, Giant Shrimp Monster and Monster of Creepy Cove.
- Peso (voiced by Paul Panting in the British version, Wayne Grayson in the American version) is a penguin with a British accent (Spanish accent in the US version) and the medic of the Octonauts. He is not fond of scary situations, but steps up if someone is hurt or in trouble.
- Professor Inkling (voiced by Keith Wickham) is a dumbo octopus who speaks in a posh accent. Inkling is an oceanographer and assembled the Octonauts to study the oceans.
- Dr. Shellington (voiced by Keith Wickham) is a sea otter who speaks with a Scottish accent. Dr. Shellington is a biologist who assists the Octonauts on missions. He is not a very good driver and once crashed the GUP-D.
- Tweak (voiced by Jo Wyatt; Jaimie Kelton in season 1 of the American version) is a rabbit who speaks with a Southern-US accent. Tweak works as an engineer and is based in the launch bay, where she created the GUP-X and GUP-S.
- Dashi (voiced by Teresa Gallagher in the UK version, Mary Murphy in seasons 1–4 of the US version, Jenny Yokobori in "The Caves of Sac Actun"–present of the US version) is a Dachshund who is the photographer for the Octonauts and takes care of all the computers aboard the Octopod. She is also a professional surfer.
- Tunip (voiced by Michael C. Murphy) is a Vegimal who is half-tuna, half-turnip, but has the outward appearance of a harbour seal mixed with a turnip. He loves to make kelp cakes and work in the greenhouse as the Octonauts' head cook and gardener. He is also the leader of the Vegimals

=== Vegimals ===
Vegimals are half-animal, half-vegetable creatures who Shellington initially found as eggs attached to the side of the Octopod. To protect them he brought them into his lab, where they hatched a few days later. After a few weeks, the Vegimals established themselves as an integral part of the crew. They primarily speak Vegimalese, a language made of chirps and warbles (heavily accented English with inter-mixed gibberish), though they also speak a limited amount of English (with an accent). Shellington is the only non-vegimal Octonaut who has some fluency in Vegimalese.

- Albachoy is a bok choy-albacore hybrid.
- Barrot is a carrot-bass hybrid. Although nervous, he can go super fast in an emergency.
- Carprika is a paprika-carp hybrid.
- Charchard is a chard-char hybrid.
- Codish is a radish-cod hybrid. He is very clumsy and tends to cause accidents.
- Grouber is a tuber-grouper hybrid. He is big and can eat almost anything.
- Halibeet is a beet-halibut hybrid.
- Maccoli is a broccoli-mackerel hybrid.
- Perchkin is a pumpkin-perch hybrid.
- Pikato is a tomato-pike hybrid.
- Salepeño is a jalapeño-salmon hybrid.
- Sharchini is a zucchini-shark hybrid.
- Tominnow is a tomato-minnow hybrid. She is a daredevil and the smallest of the Vegimals.
- VegiBot is a robotic Vegimal.
- Wallabaga is a rutabaga-walleye hybrid.
- Yamchovy is a anchovy-yam hybrid.

=== Minor characters ===
- Calico Jack is a pirate who is Kwazii's grandfather.
- Pinto is Peso's younger brother. He initially aspires to be a pirate, like Kwazii, but later decides he would rather be a medic like Peso.
- Sandy is a sea turtle and friend of Tweak. She swims long distances and makes appointments to meet the Octonauts in several episodes.
- Boris is a narwhal and childhood friend of Barnacles. Boris remains in the Arctic but the Octonauts meet him in several episodes.
- Pearl is a sea otter who is Shellington's sister.
- Bianca is a polar bear who is Captain Barnacles' twin sister.
- Orson and Ursa are Bianca's children and respectively Barnacle's niece and nephew.
- Professor Natquik is an Arctic fox and old friend of Barnacles. He is a polar explorer and loves to explore rivers under the ice.
- Marsh is a rabbit and Tweak's father. He works as a park ranger and loves to explore swamps.
- Koshi is Dashi's younger sister.
- Squirt is Professor Inkling's nephew. He lives in a 'sea mount', which is an underwater mountain.

== Vehicles ==
- The Octopod is the Octonauts' mobile home base. It is modeled after a giant octopus.
- The GUP-A is a propeller-powered vehicle and Captain Barnacles' favourite. It is modeled after an anglerfish.
- The GUP-B is a turbo sub favored by Kwazii that is modeled after a tiger shark. Tweak modified the Gup-B with adjustable fins resembling a shark's and a camouflage mode to resemble a shark.
- The GUP-C is a vehicle is modeled after a blue whale and is powerful enough to tow an elephant seal or the entire Octopod. It can also be used as an icebreaker when fitted with a special reinforced prow.
- The GUP-D is a multi-purpose vehicle modeled after a manta ray that is favored by Tweak. It is equipped with two claws, two drills, and six legs.
- The GUP-E is an ambulance vehicle modeled after a guppy. It has a tank at the vehicle's rear that can be filled with water to transport aquatic animals.
- The GUP-F is a pedal-powered vehicle modeled after a clownfish and the first GUP built. It was destroyed by a hurricane and converted into an artificial reef.
- The GUP-G is a ship modeled after a salamander. It is designed to function on land and water, similar to a salamander.
- The GUP-H is a helicopter modeled after a dragonfly that is designed to observe the ocean from above.
- The GUP-I is a polar exploration station and rugged vehicle. It is modeled after a tardigrade.
- The GUP-J is a small, swift hovercraft modeled after a tree frog. It exclusively appeared in the series' toy line.
- The GUP-K is a half-air-boat, half-tank vehicle that can float on the surface. It is modeled after a crocodile or alligator.
- The GUP-L is a seaplane modeled after a flying fish. It exclusively appeared in the series' toy line.
- The GUP-M is a three-wheeling buggy designed to scout and search swamps and marshes. It is modeled after a mudskipper.
- The GUP-N is a red coloured all-purpose vehicle.
- The GUP-O is a jet ski designed to mimic the movements of an orca, including a tail that moves up and down as it travels. It exclusively appears in the end credits of the fourth season episodes and the series' toy line.
- The GUP-P is a first response emergency vehicle and medical station modeled after a parrotfish. It has a beak-like hatch at the nose of the vehicle for transport.
- The GUP-Q is an undersea exploration vehicle for search and rescue, especially in dark caves. It is modeled after a hammerhead shark, featuring a flat head with searchlights for eyes.
- The GUP-R is a vehicle modeled after a sailfish that is designed for rescue missions in and out of water. It possesses a dorsal fin and wings that are lower for hydroplane mode. The GUP-R exclusively appeared in the series' toy line.
- The GUP-S is a propeller-powered amphibious Antarctic exploration vehicle, modeled after a narwhal or a swordfish, which can split into two sections, like the GUP-X. The main body of the vehicle is an underwater Octo-Shuttle, which has two pairs of continuous track wheels for travelling on the Ocean floor, an antifreeze system to prevent the ship from freezing over, a research lab, and a sleeping quarters. The detachable cockpit forms a snowmobile called the Octo-Sled, which is equipped with a heated drill and an extendable rescue line.
- The GUP-T is a rescue rover that is modeled after a sea pig and travels on rotating tread wheels. It is equipped with cannons that shoot out a special sanitising slime to break down pollutants. The GUP-T exclusively appeared in the series' toy line.
- The GUP-U is an agile vehicle modeled after a frogfish that can travel fast and also stand in patrol position for lookout. The GUP-U exclusively appeared in the series' toy line.
- The GUP-V is a train-like vehicle designed by the Vegimals and made from improvised materials.
- The GUP-W is a mobile emergency medical centre modeled after a whale shark that is specially designed to treat coral reefs. The front can open, creating a ramp that can also function as a launch bay for other GUP vehicles.
- The GUP-X is an armoured tracked vehicle modeled after a horseshoe crab. It can split into three sections: a glider, the 'Octo-Ski' and its central main section with the caterpillar tracks.
- The GUP-Y is a deep-sea excavation vehicle that is modeled after a yeti crab and designed for deep-sea environments. It has long arms, ideal for hauling and transporting material. The GUP-Y exclusively appeared in the series' toy line.
- The Mega GUP-Z is a specialised vehicle modeled after a mantis shrimp and designed for volcanic environments. It is also capable of assuming a humanoid robot configuration for a limited amount of time.
- The Deep Sea Octolab is a moveable base from which the deepest parts of the ocean can be studied. It is dome-shaped and stands on springy legs to deal with subterranean tremors.
- The Octo Servicing Station is a vehicle servicing scaffold constructed on the seabed. It is used to refurbish the Octopod and manufacture the GUP-K and GUP-H.

== Books ==
The original books were first published in the US by Immedium in 2006 and were republished in the UK by HarperCollins in 2009. 6 titles by Meomi have been published:

- The Octonauts & the Only Lonely Monster, about an Architeuthis (giant squid).
- The Octonauts & the Sea of Shade, about a world where everyone's shadows have gone missing.
- The Octonauts & the Frown Fish, about a glum-looking catfish.
- The Octonauts & the Great Ghost Reef, about coral bleaching.
- The Octonauts Explore the Great Big Ocean, about the search for the home of Tunip the Vegimal.
- The Octonauts & the Growing Goldfish, about Dunkie, a giant goldfish who will not stop growing.

A series of shorter books based on individual episodes from the TV series is being published by Simon & Schuster. These titles can be distinguished by the "As seen on TV" label on the covers and are not written or illustrated by Meomi. The books have the same titles as the episodes they are based on.

== History ==
In 2010, The Octonauts was adapted into a 52-episode CGI animated television series co-produced by Chorion and Brown Bag Films. It first aired in the UK on 4 October 2010 on CBeebies, a BBC television channel for children under 7. The first series ended in February 2011 but continued to be aired as repeats. A second series of 22 episodes commenced in November 2012.

The Octonauts had its US premiere on the Disney Channel on 9 January 2012 In September 2014, Silvergate Media announced its sale of season 4 to the Disney Channel, to be aired in 2015. In Australia, in 2014, the Octonauts became the second most-watched children's TV show in the country, seen daily on ABC2 by 257,000 viewers nationally. By season 4, the Octonauts had been picked up in more than 100 countries, including RTÉ Two (Ireland), Treehouse TV (Canada), ABC Television (Australia), TF1 (France), SuperRTL (Germany), CCTV (China), Karusel (Russia), Disney Junior (Spain, Portugal), and SVT (Sweden).

The show has been translated and shown in French (TF1), Spanish and Portuguese (Discovery Kids Latin America), Finnish (YLE TV2), Welsh (S4C), and Slovak (STV 2). The series was made with the help of marine biologists Dr. Lara A. Ferry-Graham and Dr. Michael H. Graham, who had previously worked on Finding Nemo.

== Episodes ==
The TV show is episodic, with each 11-minute episode seeing them encountering an unusual but real sea creature as they explore strange underwater worlds. Often they must discover a vital biological or behavioral fact about that creature to rescue it or themselves from danger. The stories usually feature three main characters: Captain Barnacles, Kwazii, and Peso, with the other five Octonauts acting in supporting roles.

The opening theme tune finishes with the chant "Explore! – Rescue! – Protect!", the Octonauts' motto.

| Series | Episodes | Originally released | |
| Series | Episodes | First released | Last released |
|---|---|---|---|
| 1 | 50 | 4 October 2010 | 11 February 2011 |
| 2 | 22 | 19 November 2012 | 3 September 2013 |
| 3 | 20 | 4 September 2013 | 22 September 2015 |
| 4 | 24 | 23 September 2015 | 27 October 2017 |
| Specials | 12 | 13 December 2010 | 30 March 2021 |
| 5 | 27 | 27 March 2023 | 30 September 2026 |

=== Creature Reports ===
Creature Reports are one-minute, musical, poem-like sequences that recap the facts learned about the sea creature that the Octonauts encountered in the associated episode. In the UK, these were shown as separately scheduled items, but in the American version, they were used after each regular episode. The exception is the episode of "The Surfing Snails", where it was replaced with a surf rock song called, "Surf's Up, Bubbles Up (Ready to Ride)".

The Creature Reports' addictive, repetitive nature has been postulated to have psychological benefits. For children, it provides a sense of predictability that promotes good feelings and mental balance. For adults, it provides a sense of virtual participation via the principle of involuntary musical imagery.

The initial working title of the 2017 American superhero film Thor: Ragnarok was Creature Report, a reference to the Octonauts, which acted as the movie production's code word.

== Video services ==
Seasons of Octonauts are available on variety of streaming and direct purchase video services.

=== Streaming services ===
| Service provider | Country availability | Content |
|---|---|---|
| ABC iView | Australia | Season 3 (episodes 73, 74, 78, 82 & 84–91); Season 4 (episodes 93–101, 103–110 & 114); Special 8 |
| Netflix | Worldwide | Seasons 2–4; Special 3, 5, 8 & 9 |
| Stan | Australia | Season 4; Specials 3–5 & 7 |

=== Direct purchase services ===
| Service provider | Country availability | Content |
|---|---|---|
| Apple TV/iTunes | Worldwide | Series 1–4; Specials 1–9 |
| Google Play | Worldwide | Series 1 (except episodes 49 & 50); Series 2; Series 3 (except episode 76); Series 4 (except episode 115); Specials 1–9 |
| Microsoft Store | Worldwide | Series 1 (episodes 22–28, 29–35 & 36–42); Series 4 (episodes 99, 102, 112, 113, 116) |

Google Play and Microsoft Store organise their episodes into packages, similar to the region 4 DVD titles.

| Package | Episodes |
|---|---|
| Meet the Octonauts | Series 1 (1–7) |
| To the Gups! | Series 1 (8–14) |
| Ready for Action! | Series 1 (15–21) |
| Sound the Octoalert! | Series 1 (22–28) |
| Jumpin' Jelly Fish | Series 1 (29–35) |
| Shiver me Whiskers | Series 1 (36–42) |
| The Great Penguin Race | Series 1 (43–47) & Special 1 |
| GUP X to the Rescue! | Series 2 (51–55) & Special 2 |
| Amazon Adventure | Series 2 (56, 57, 62, 63) & Special 3 |
| Calling All Gups! | Series 2 (56, 64, 69–71, 83 & 92) |
| Deep Sea Adventures! | Series 2 (60, 61) & Season 3 (73, 79, 80) & Special 4 |
| Flappity Flippers | Series 2 (episodes 66–68), Season 3 (episode 75, 84–86) |
| Great Arctic Adventure | Series 2 (episodes 66–68), Season 3 (episode 75, 84–86) & Special 7 |
| Here Come the Vegimals | Series 3 (episode 74, 78, 87–89) & Special 5 |
| Over Under Adventure | Series 3 (episode 94, 97, 98, 101) & Special 6 |
| The Great Swamp Search | Series 4 (episode 96, 100, 103, 105–107) & Special 9 |
| Octopod Mystery | Series 4 (episode 93, 95, 104, 108–111) |
| Operation Deep Freeze | Series 4 (episode 99, 102, 112, 113, 116) & Special 8 |
| ABC Kids | Series 4 (episode 48) |

== Reception ==
The TV series was well-received when shown on CBeebies in the UK and by ABC in Australia. According to the authors' website, it was the No. 1 pre-school age show in the UK, and the first pre-school show to be ranked in the top ten by older audiences (aged 3–4 and up). The show was the top-ranked ABC programme for 5- to 12-year-olds in January 2011 in Australia, with the ABC calling its first month an "unprecedented success online and on-air". The Octonauts DVD boxset was the 4th best-selling Children's TV DVD at Amazon UK as of 7 April 2013.

== Awards and nominations ==
In 2013, Octonauts was nominated for two awards: an International Emmy Award in the "Kids—Preschool" category and an Irish Film and Television Award in the "Best Children's/Youth Programme" category.

In 2017, the series took home the Annie Award for Best Animated Television Production in the Preschool category for the episode "Operation: Deep Freeze".

| Year | Award | Category | Nominee | Result |
|---|---|---|---|---|
| 2011 | British Academy Children's Awards | Pre-School Animation | Octonauts | Nominated |
| 2013 | International Emmy Award | Kids-Preschool | Octonauts | Nominated |
| 2013 | 11th Irish Film & Television Awards | Children's/Youth Programme | Octonauts | Won |
| 2013 | British Academy Children's Awards | Pre-School Animation | Octonauts | Nominated |
| 2017 | 45th Annie Awards | Best Animated Television Production | "Operation: Deep Freeze" | Won |
| 2018 | British Academy Children's Awards | Pre-School Animation | Octonauts | Nominated |

== Films ==
In 2020, two new movies were released on Netflix: on 14 August, The Octonauts Movie: The Caves of Sac Actun (which takes place in a cenote in Mexico) and on 13 October, The Octonauts & the Great Barrier Reef (a musical). In 2021, The Octonauts Movie: The Ring of Fire was released 30 March on Netflix in the United States. On May 1st 2025, a Chinese exclusive film titled "海底小纵队：海啸大危机" (in English as "Octonauts: The Crisis of the Tsunami"), it's notably more of a disaster action film rather than an educational film, and has no US or Netflix release as it was animated in Chinese

== Spin-offs ==
The Octonauts brand has been licensed by the production company for numerous spin-off activities. These include Octonauts Rollercoaster Adventure, a themed rollercoaster within the CBeebies Land of Alton Towers theme park and themed bedrooms with the CBeebies Land Hotel. There is also a travelling live show called Octonauts Live, which has toured in the U.S. and other countries.

An Octonauts app was launched for iOS on 17 November 2016, produced in partnership with Night and Day Studios.

A spin off series, titled Octonauts: Above and Beyond, premiered on 7 September 2021, with the full first episode being released on YouTube on 25 August. Rather than an aquatic setting, Above and Beyond features the crew exploring and assisting in natural habitats such as forests and deserts; essentially all terrestrial habitats.
