= Protelpidia =

Scientific classification
- Domain: Eukaryota
- Kingdom: Animalia
- Phylum: Echinodermata
- Class: Holothuroidea
- Order: Elasipodida
- Family: Elpidiidae
- Genus: Protelpidia; Gebruk, 1983

Genus of sea cucumbers

Protelpidia is a monotypic genus of deep-sea sea cucumbers.

== Species ==
There is one species recognised in the genus Protelpidia:

- Protelpidia murrayi Théel, 1879
