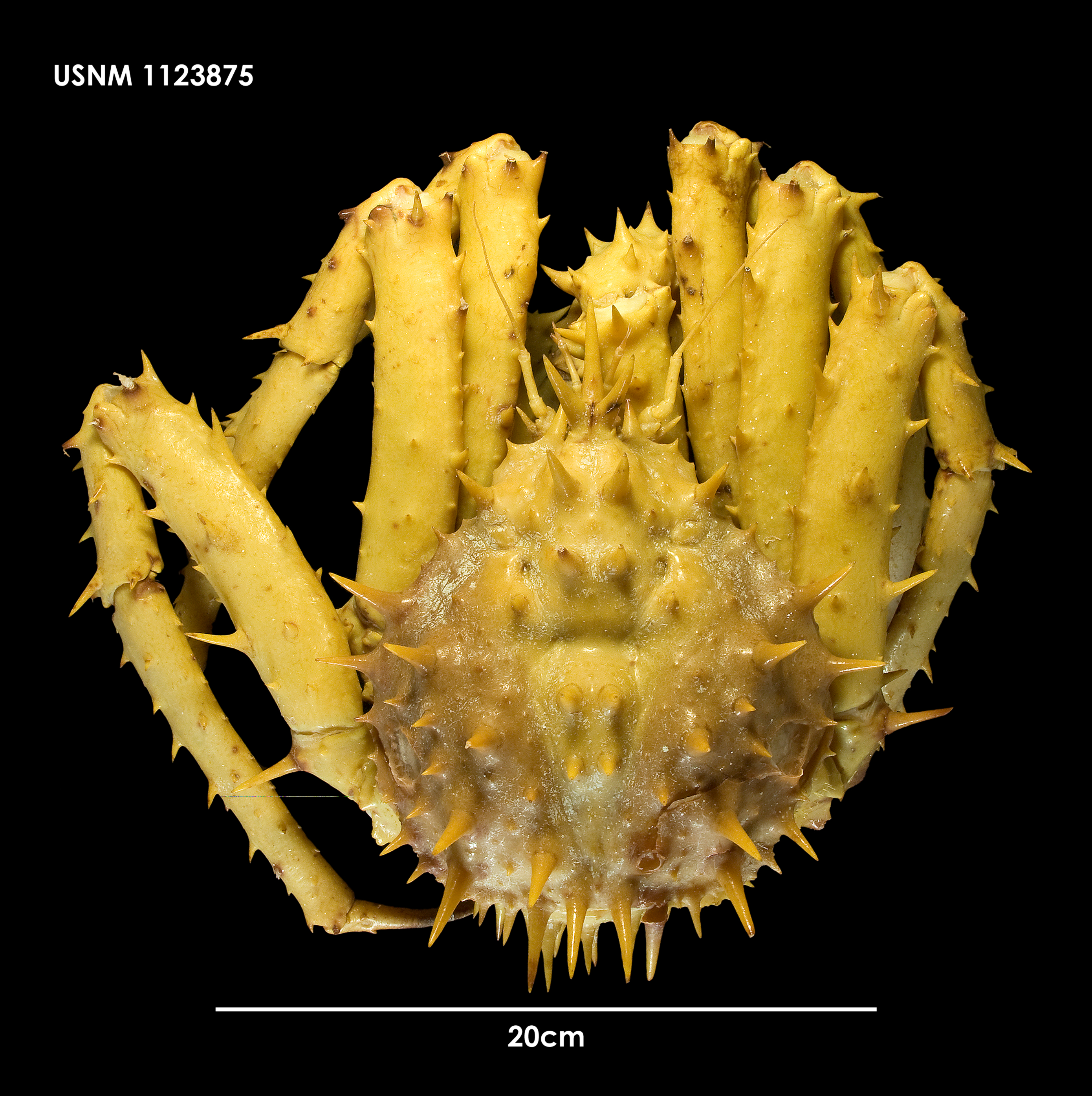

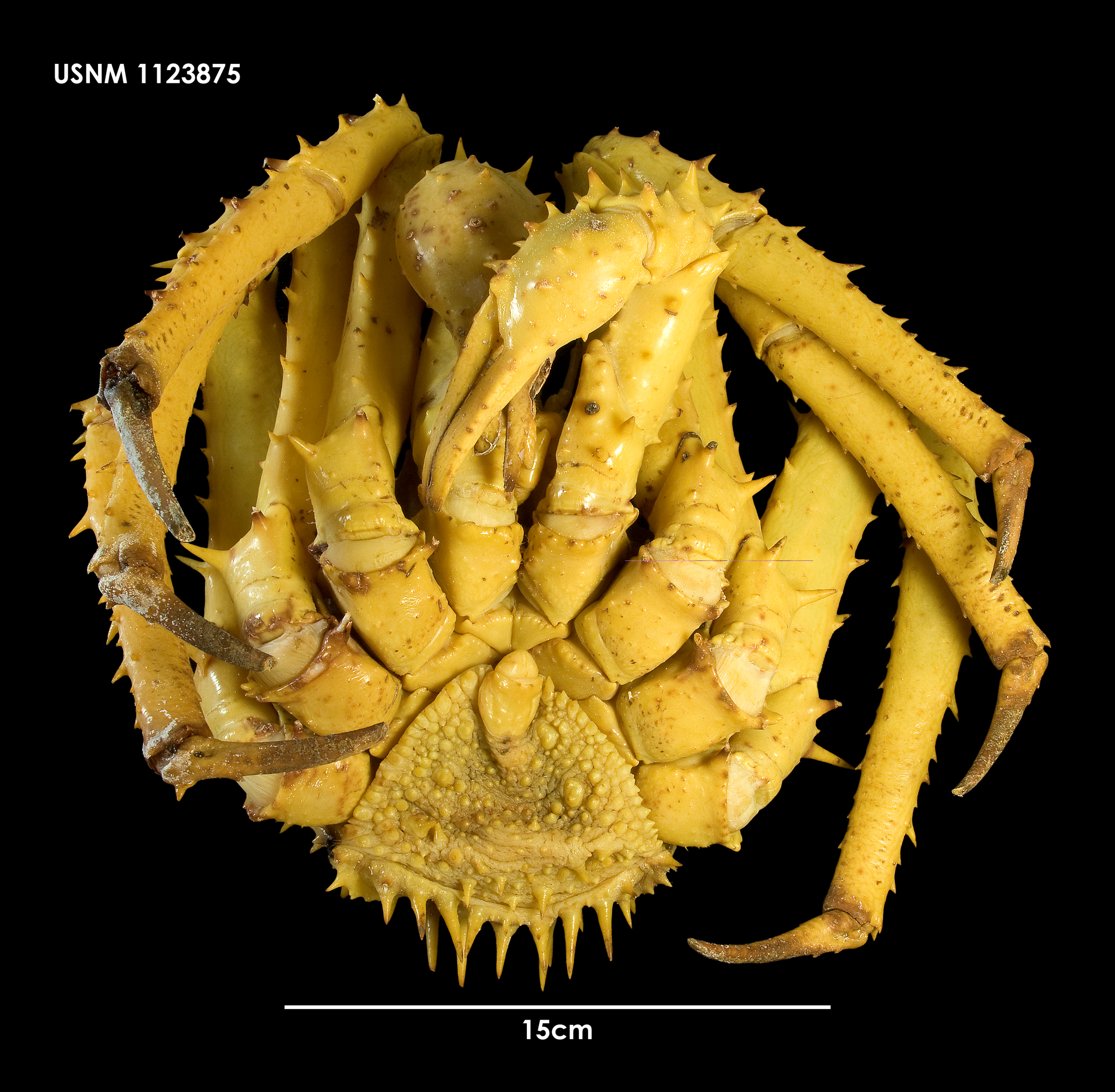

Scientific classification
- Kingdom: Animalia
- Phylum: Arthropoda
- Clade: Pancrustacea
- Class: Malacostraca
- Order: Decapoda
- Suborder: Pleocyemata
- Infraorder: Anomura
- Family: Lithodidae
- Genus: Neolithodes
- Species: N. diomedeae

Binomial name
- Neolithodes diomedeae (Benedict, 1895)

Synonyms
- Lithodes diomedeae Benedict, 1895; Neolithodes martii Birstein & Vinogradov, 1972

= Neolithodes diomedeae =

Species of king crab

Neolithodes diomedeae is a species of king crab that is found in the eastern Pacific Ocean, the southwestern Atlantic Ocean, and the Bellingshausen and Scotia Seas in the Southern Ocean. They occur from 200 to 2,454 m (655 to 8,050 ft).

== Description ==
Carapace is usually bright red; its spines remain thick and well-developed but show less size difference compared to juveniles. Granules on smooth surfaces are less acute and sometimes faint. In the gastric region, the central spine may become a tubercle, and the transverse row of granules is often less distinct or absent. The cardiac, branchial. Females display larger spines on asymmetrical plates. Their Walking legs maintain the same relative lengths as in juveniles. The species reaches about 145 mm (5.7 in) in length and 162 mm (6.4 in) in width, it makes N. diomedeae the largest lithodids known in South Georgia, and the deepest known occurring lithodid. It inhabits depths 640–2,450 m (2,100–8,040 ft) in the Southern Atlantic, though they were not found above 950 m (3,120 ft). And because it is not commercial yet, its large size and quality could suggest it can be a potential commercial value of this species.

The examination of the autonomous cameras of the ROV Highlight specimen of N. diomedeae suggests it may grow much more larger approaching a carapace length more than 150 mm (5.9 in), and the carapace width along the walking pair of legs may approach 500 mm (20 in).

== Ecology ==
Neolithodes diomedeae are opportunistic, necrophagous scavengers. In the Gulf of California's abyssal plain, they live around hydrothermal vents and feed on organic material which falls from the pelagic zone. In deep-sea sedimentary habitats, young N. diomedeae have been found to have a symbiotic relationship with sea cucumbers, frequently situating themselves on or underneath members of the genus Scotoplanes. This relationship is hypothesized to be related to elevated food availability and shelter from predation. They have also shown an affinity for situating themselves on corals, especially as juveniles.
