= Sea tulip =

Common name for various species of Pyura sea squirts

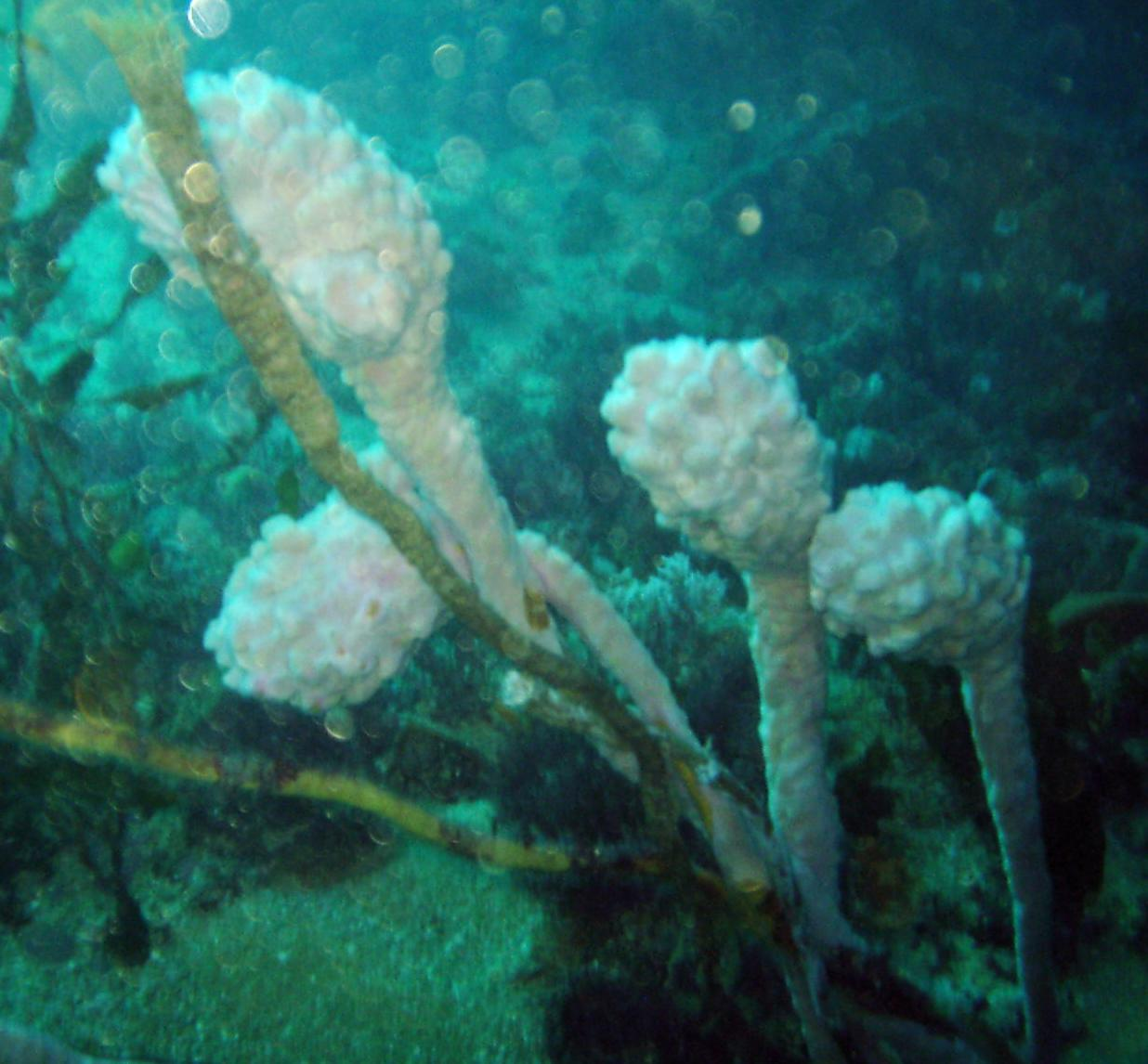
A sea tulip colony in Australia.

Sea tulip is the common name of a few species of sessile ascidians (sea squirts) in the genus Pyura that live in coastal waters at depths of up to 80 m (260 feet).

Like all ascidians, sea tulips are filter feeders. Their common name comes from their appearance, consisting of a knobbly 'bulb' or flower attached to a long stalk. Sea tulips come in a variety of colours, including white, pink, yellow, orange and purple. The colouration of sea tulips depends upon their association with a symbiotic sponge that covers their surface.

Despite their common name, sea tulips are animals and not plants.

Two examples of sea squirts known as sea tulips are P. pachydermatina and P. spinifera.
