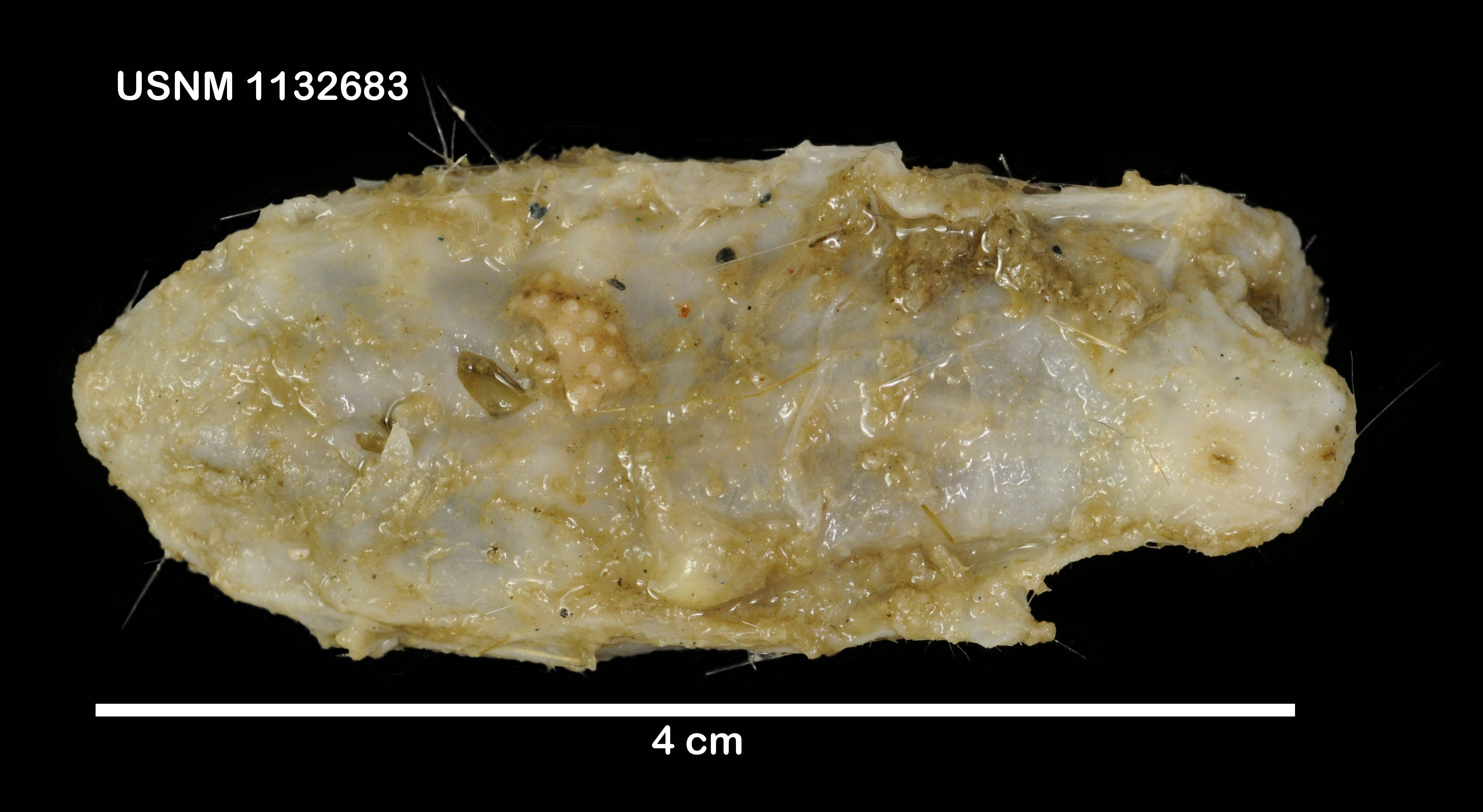
- Peniagone vignoni specimen

Scientific classification
- Kingdom: Animalia
- Phylum: Echinodermata
- Class: Holothuroidea
- Order: Elasipodida
- Family: Elpidiidae
- Genus: Peniagone; Théel, 1882

Species
- See text

Synonyms
- Elpidiogone Perrier R., 1902; Parelpidia Théel, 1882; Scotoanassa Théel, 1882

= Peniagone =

Genus of sea cucumbers

Peniagone is a genus of deep-sea sea cucumbers in the family Elpidiidae. Peniagone wyvillii is the type species.

== Species ==
The following species are recognised in the genus Peniagone:

- Peniagone affinis Théel, 1882
- Peniagone anamesa (Clark, 1920)
- Peniagone azorica Marenzeller von, 1892
- Peniagone challengeri Théel, 1882
- Peniagone coccinea Rogacheva & Gebruk in Rogacheva et al., 2013
- Peniagone crozeti Cross & Gebruk in Cross et al., 2009
- Peniagone diaphana (Théel, 1882)
- Peniagone dubia (D'yakonov & Savel'eva in D'yakonov et al., 1958)
- Peniagone elongata (Théel, 1879)
- Peniagone ferruginea Grieg, 1921
- Peniagone gracilis (Ludwig, 1894)
- Peniagone herouardi Gebruk, 1988
- Peniagone horrifer Théel, 1882
- Peniagone incerta (Théel, 1882)
- Peniagone intermedia Ludwig, 1893
- Peniagone islandica Deichmann, 1930
- Peniagone japonica Ohshima, 1915
- Peniagone leander Pawson & Foell, 1986
- Peniagone longipapillata Gebruk, 2008
- Peniagone lugubris Théel, 1882
- Peniagone marecoi Gebruk, 2008
- Peniagone mossmani Vaney, 1908
- Peniagone papillata Hansen, 1975
- Peniagone porcella R. Perrier, 1896
- Peniagone purpurea (Théel, 1882)
- Peniagone thieli Gebruk, 1997
- Peniagone vedeli Hansen, 1956
- Peniagone vignoni Hérouard, 1901
- Peniagone vitrea Théel, 1882
- Peniagone willemoesi (Théel, 1882)
- Peniagone wiltoni Vaney, 1908
- Peniagone wyvillii Théel, 1882
