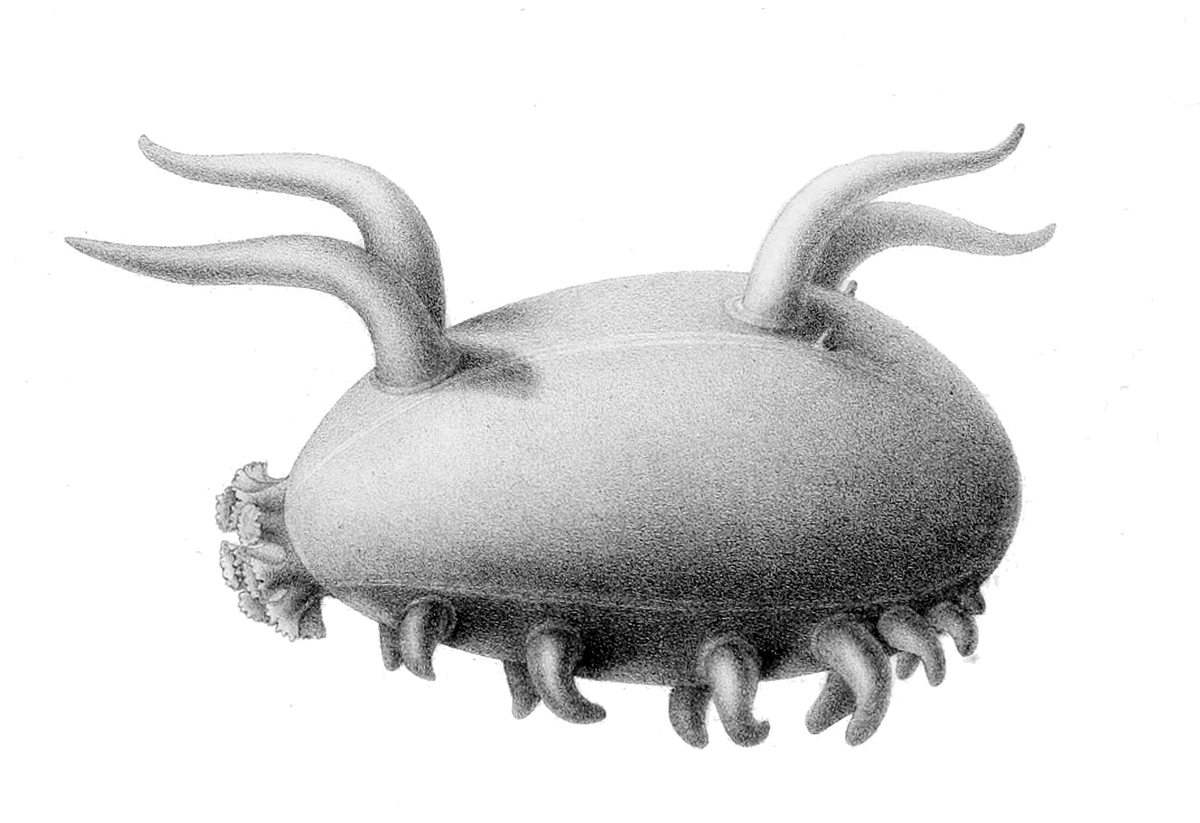

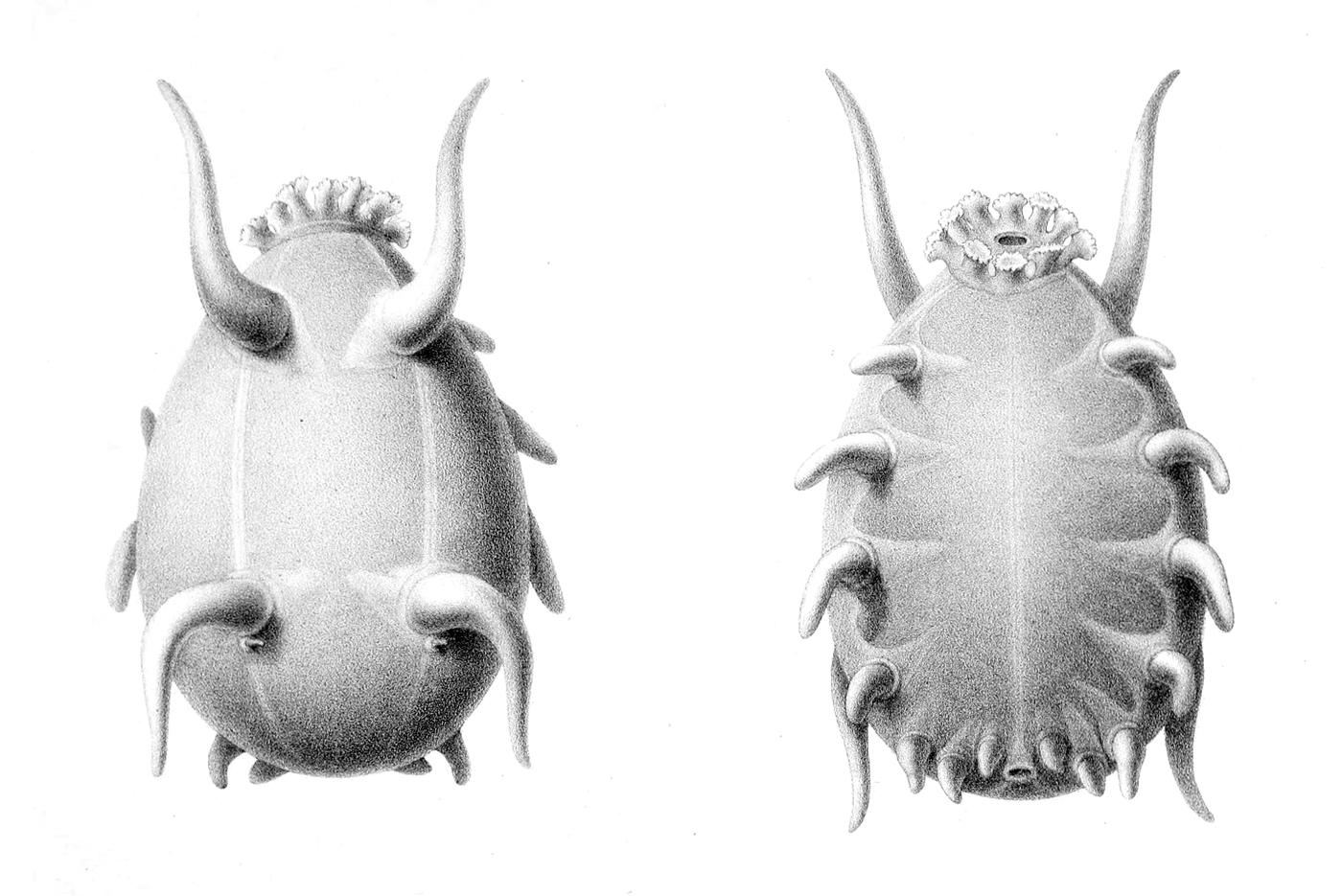
- Scotoplanes globosa

Scientific classification
- Kingdom: Animalia
- Phylum: Echinodermata
- Class: Holothuroidea
- Order: Elasipodida
- Family: Elpidiidae
- Genus: Scotoplanes; Théel, 1882

= Scotoplanes =

Genus of deep-sea sea cucumbers known as sea pigs

Scotoplanes is a genus of deep-sea sea cucumbers in the family Elpidiidae. The species in this genus are commonly known as sea pigs.

== Species ==
The genus includes the following species:

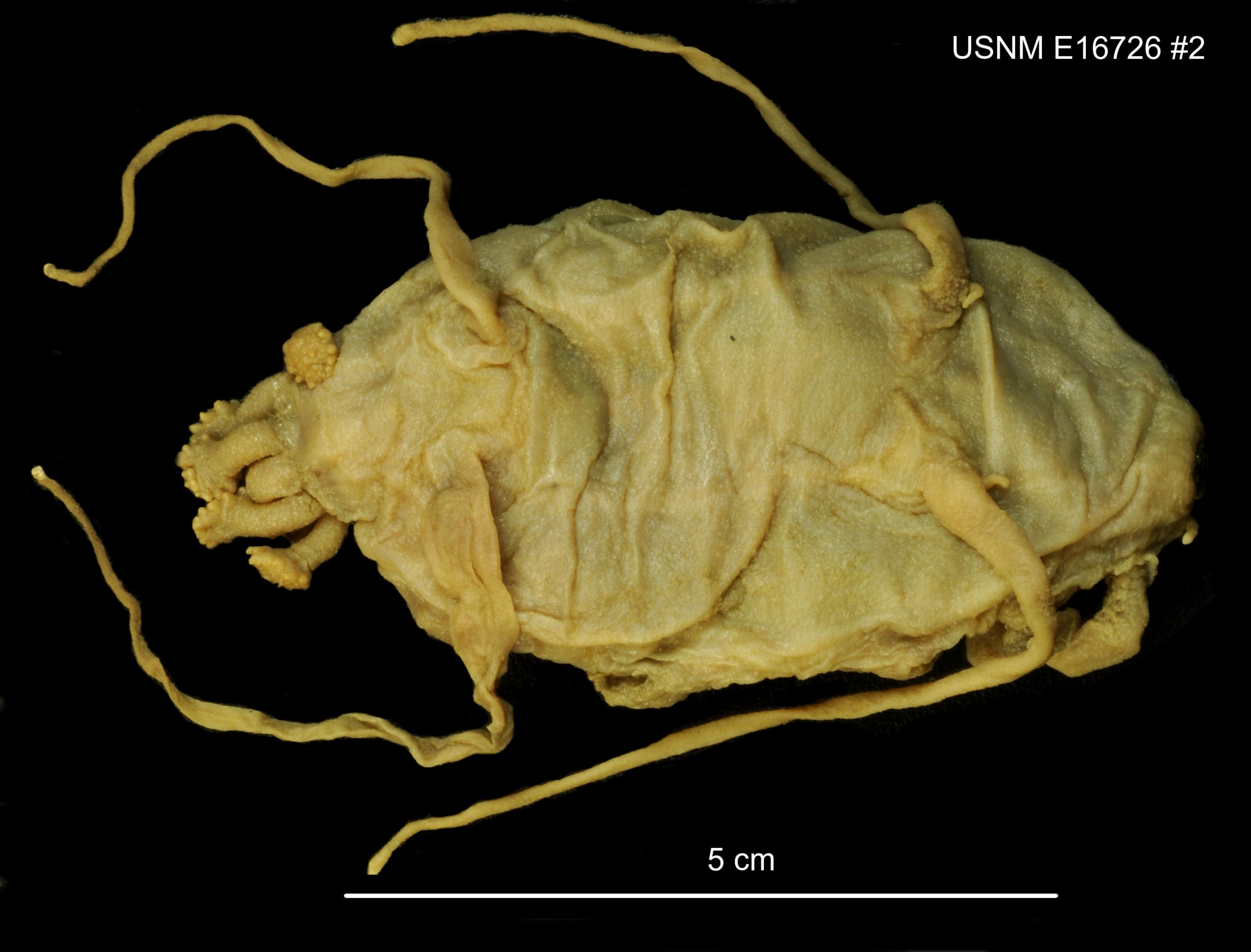
Ventral view of Scotoplanes globosa showcasing its tube feet

- Scotoplanes clarki
- Scotoplanes globosa
- Scotoplanes hanseni
- Scotoplanes kurilensis
- Scotoplanes theeli

In 2024, a bright pink sea pig was discovered in the Clarion–Clipperton zone, belonging to an undescribed species. Due to its coloration, it was nicknamed the "Barbie Pig" in reference to the 2023 Barbie film.

== Description ==
Members of Scotoplanes grow 4 to 6 inches (10 to 15 centimeters) long. They are bilaterally symmetrical with six pairs of tube feet, which are largest at mid-body and smallest near the anus. Scotoplanes have ten buccal tentacles lining the oral cavity. Papillae are found on their dorsum.

Scotoplanes share many morphological features with echinoderms, including their respiratory, vascular, and nervous systems. Scotoplanes have a poorly developed respiratory system, with gas exchange occurring through the anus. Their bodies are adapted to the high pressure of the benthic zone of the ocean, and bringing them too close to the surface causes them to disintegrate. Scotoplanes have a water vascular system. The dorsal papillae are histologically similar to their tubular feet, as both contain a large muscular water vascular canal in the center. Hydraulic pressure in these canals is responsible for the efficacy of the vascular system. Scotoplanes' nervous system consists of a network of nerves without ganglia.

Histological examination shows that these deep-sea-dwelling sea pigs are similar to other Holothuroidea with a few notable differences. Most holothurians are sexually dioecious. Unlike other echinoderms, holothuroids possess only a single gonad. The water vascular system of holothurians is similar to other echinoderms, except the madreporite opens in the perivisceral coelom instead of in the external body wall. Like other holothuroids, Scotoplanes possess a single gonad—an ovary in females or a testis in males. Unlike most elasipodids, Scotoplanes exhibits active gametogenesis in both females and males, suggesting a distinct reproductive strategy. As detritivores, Scotoplanes feed on organic matter that falls to the bottom of the sea, gathering and ingesting this detritus with their tube feet. The gut is highly efficient, extracting maximum nutrition from meager resources in their immediate environment. Male Scotoplanes have protozoa inside the cyst cavities of their aboral intestines.

=== Locomotion ===
Members of the Elpidiidae have particularly enlarged, leg-like "feet" that use water cavities within the skin to inflate and deflate, thereby causing the appendages to move. These appendages differ from the standard tube feet of the order Elasipodida, as ampullae are replaced by dermal cavities to accommodate the larger size of the Elpidiidae tube feet. Scotoplanes move through the top layer of seafloor sediment and disrupt both the surface and the resident infauna as they feed. This type of movement is thought to be an adaptation to life on the soft floor of the deep sea. These creatures, however, can swim when disturbed. Some species of Scotoplanes are benthopelagic and spend considerable time in the water column. The frontal lobe and the two anal lobes propel the sea pig through the water. Their tentacles help detect their surroundings while moving.

== Ecology ==
Scotoplanes live on deep ocean bottoms, specifically on the abyssal plain in the Atlantic, Pacific and Indian Oceans, typically at depths of over 1,200 to 5,000 meters (3,900 to 16,400 feet). Some related species can be found in the Antarctic. Scotoplanes, as all other deep-sea holothurians, is a deposit feeder and obtains food by extracting organic particles from deep-sea mud. Scotoplanes globosa has been observed to demonstrate strong preferences for rich, organic food that has freshly fallen from the ocean's surface, using olfaction to locate preferred food sources such as whale falls. Scotoplanes possess distinctive mitochondrial genomes whose encoded proteins are involved in energy production. Scotoplanes, like other sea cucumbers, often occur in huge densities, sometimes numbering in the hundreds. Early collections have recorded groups of 300–600 individuals.

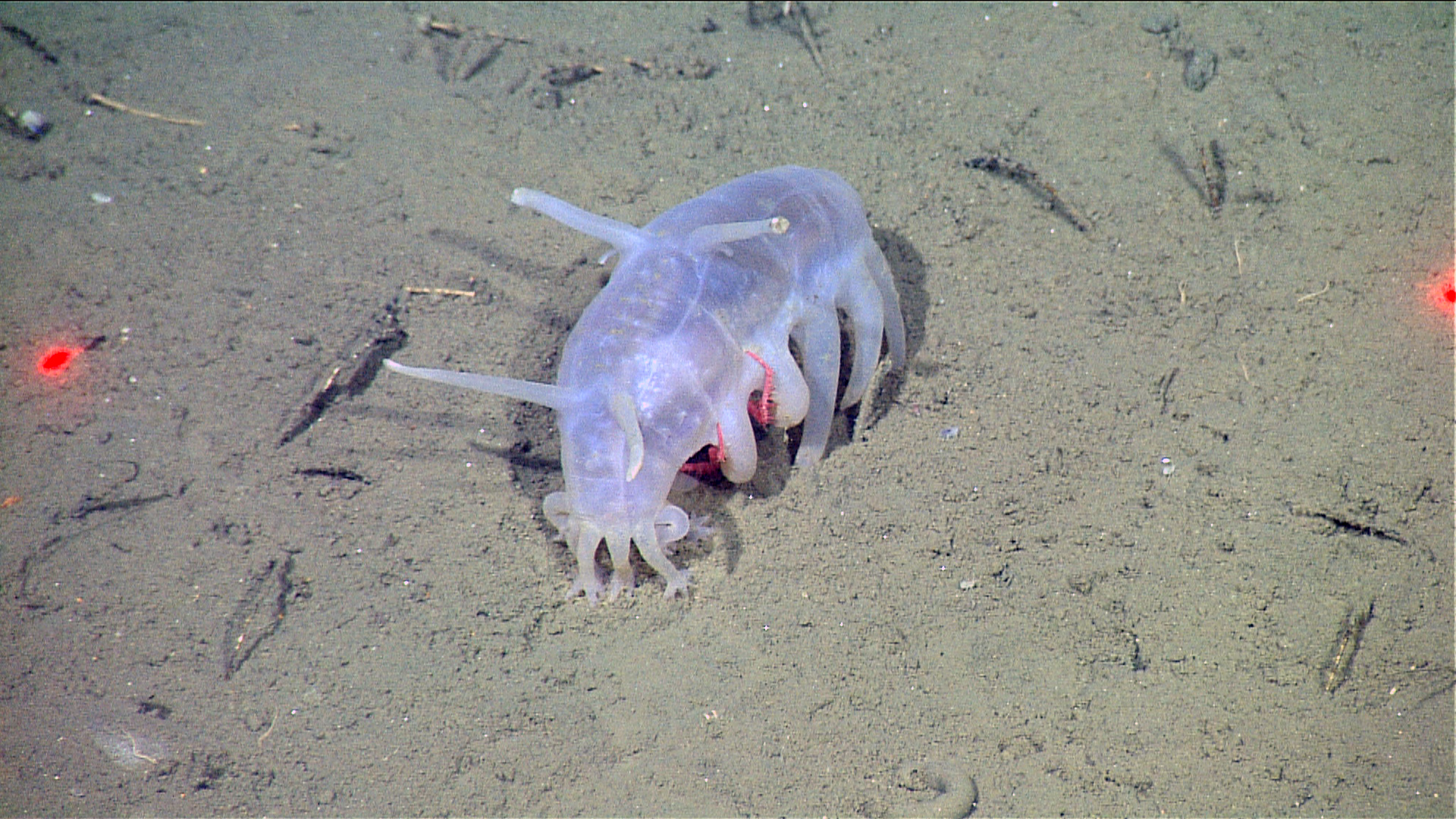
A living Scotoplanes from Monterey Bay with a juvenile Neolithodes diomedae king crab sheltering beneath it at a depth of approximately 1,260 meters. Monterey Bay Aquarium Research Institute, 2016.

Scotoplanes, like other sea cucumbers, host parasitic and commensal organisms, including gastropods and small tanaid crustaceans. For example, they provide shelter to juvenile crabs, Neolithodes diomedeae. This relationship benefits the crabs by reducing their predation risk while sheltering beneath the sea pig.

Scotoplanes are known to exhibit behavioral patterns of aggregation, where large numbers will gather together either to feed or mate.
