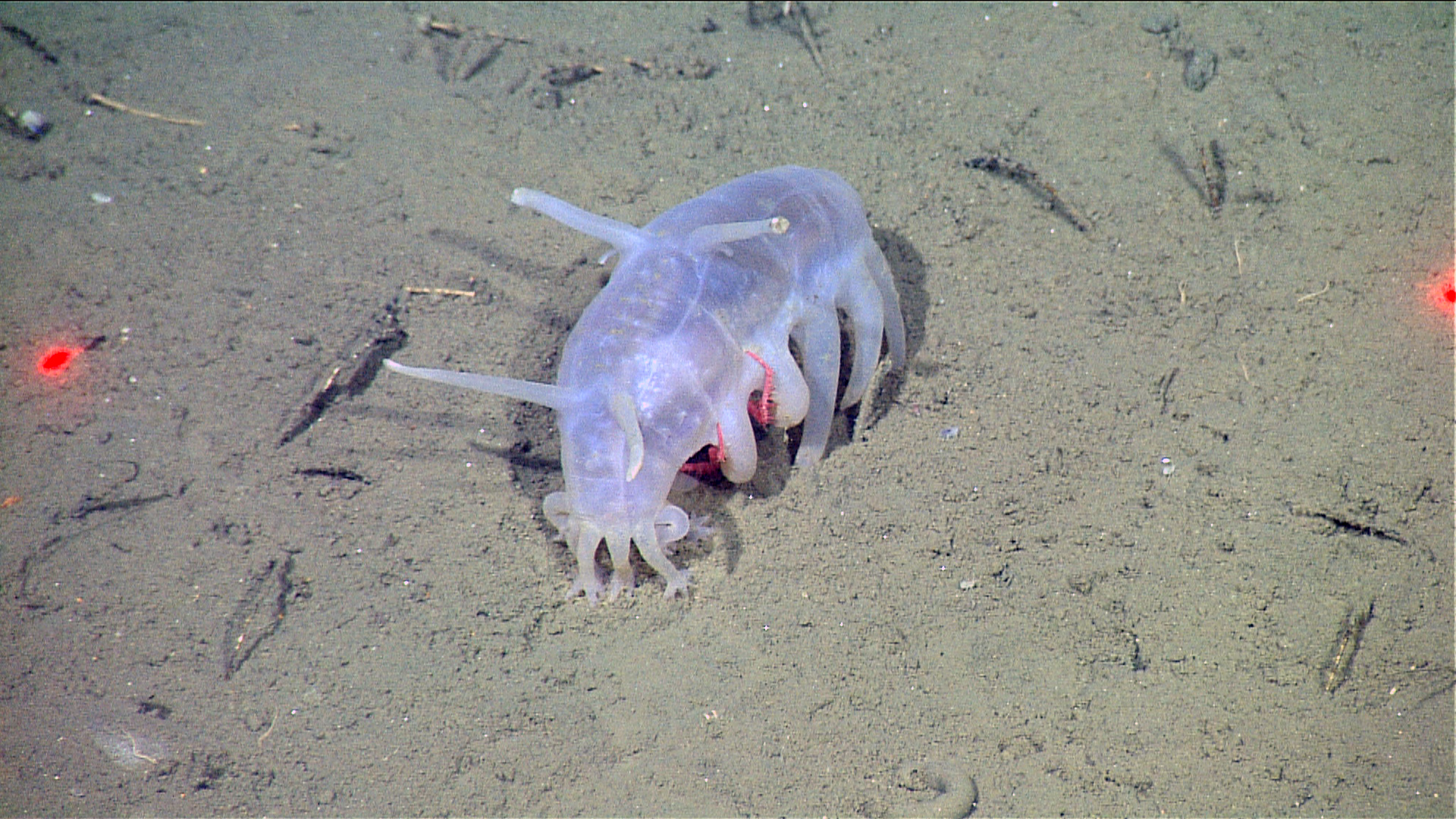
- Scotoplanes globosa

Scientific classification
- Kingdom: Animalia
- Phylum: Echinodermata
- Class: Holothuroidea
- Order: Elasipodida
- Family: Elpidiidae; Théel, 1882

Genera
- See text

= Elpidiidae =

Family of sea cucumbers

Elpidiidae is a family of deep-sea sea cucumbers.

They have a translucent body with long and stout podia acting like legs. The mouth is surrounded by thick and short oral tentacles, and the dorsal part often shows pairs of elongated podia as well, pointing upwards. Some species can also show swimming appendages on top of the mouth. Sea pigs live in the darkest parts of the ocean. When introduced to warm waters, their bodies disintegrate, making them vulnerable to sudden heat changes.

== Genera ==
The following genera are recognised in the family Elpidiidae:

- Achlyonice Théel, 1879
- Amperima Pawson, 1965
- Ellipinion Hérouard, 1923
- Elpidia Théel, 1876
- Irpa Danielssen & Koren, 1878
- Kolga Danielssen & Koren, 1879
- Peniagone Théel, 1882
- Penilpidia Gebruk, 1988
- Protelpidia Gebruk, 1983
- Psychrelpidia Hérouard, 1923
- Psychroplanes Gebruk, 1988
- Rhipidothuria Hérouard, 1901
- Scotoplanes Théel, 1882

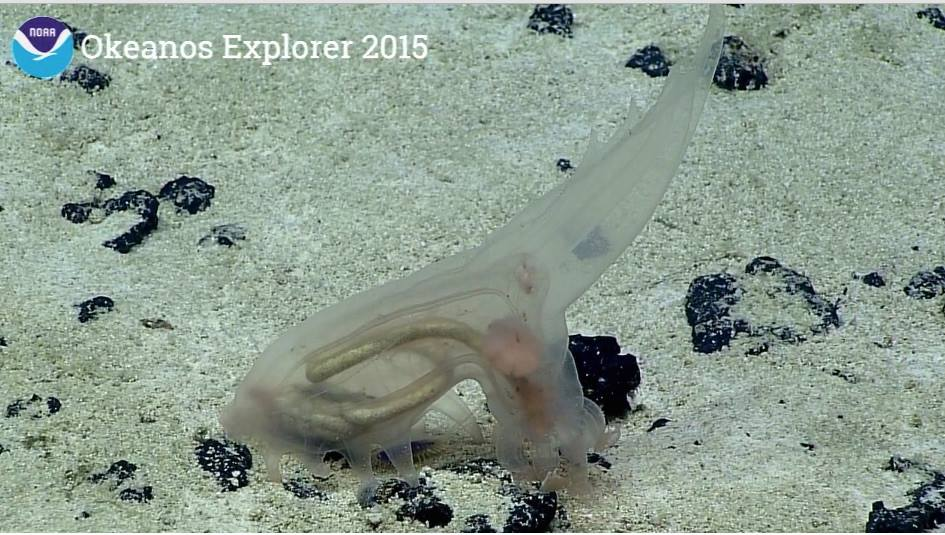
Probable Amperima sp. (2,000–3,000 m (6,600–9,800 ft) deep off Hawaii)

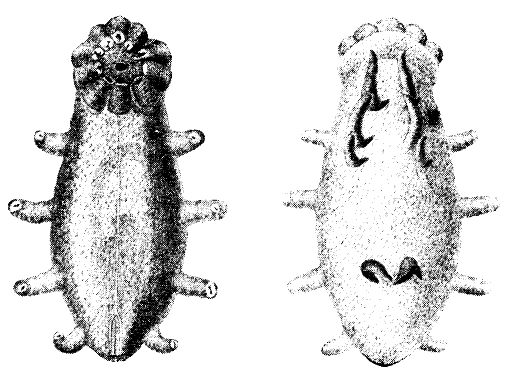
Elpidia glacialis

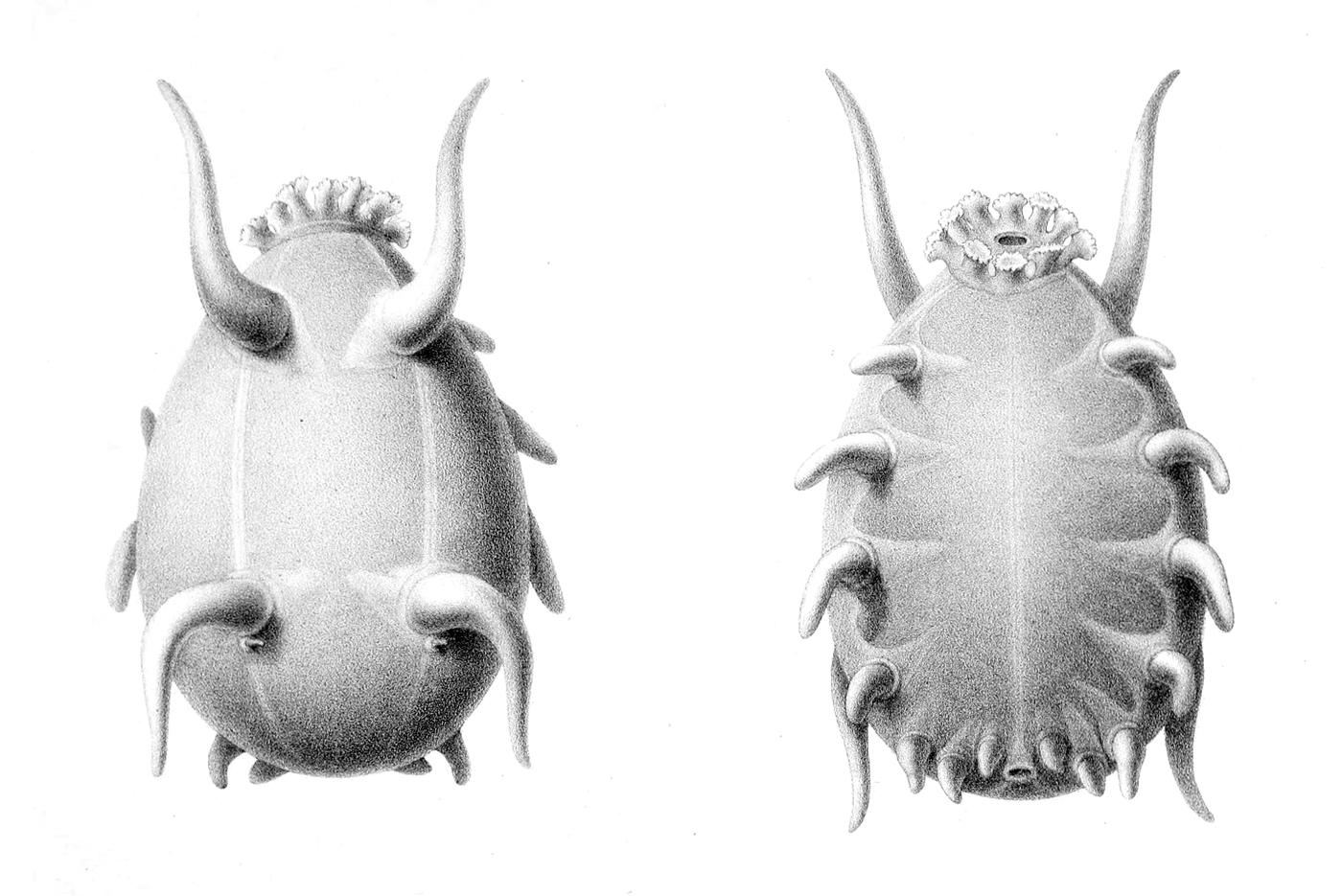
Scotoplanes globosa
