= List of data deficient invertebrates =

- Extinct in the wild (EW): 2 species
- Critically endangered (CR): 853 species
- Endangered (EN): 1,533 species
- Vulnerable (VU): 1,578 species
- Near threatened (NT, LR/cd): 1,119 species
- Least concern (LC): 8,632 species
- Data deficient (DD): 4,644 species
Invertebrate species (IUCN, 2025.2)
- 18,442 extant species have been evaluated
- 13,798 of those are fully assessed (Note: excludes data deficient evaluations.)
- 9,751 are not threatened at present
- 4,047 to 8,691 are threatened (Note: Threatened comprises CR, EN and VU. Upper estimate additionally includes DD.)
- 83 to 255 are extinct or extinct in the wild:
  - 81 extinct (EX) species (Note: Chart omits extinct (EX) species)
  - 2 extinct in the wild (EW)
  - 171 possibly extinct [CR(PE)]
  - 1 possibly extinct in the wild [CR(PEW)]

As of July 2016, the International Union for Conservation of Nature (IUCN) lists 5278 data deficient invertebrate species. 29% of all evaluated invertebrate species are listed as data deficient. The IUCN also lists 57 invertebrate subspecies as data deficient.

No subpopulations of invertebrates have been evaluated by the IUCN.

This is a complete list of data deficient invertebrate species and subspecies as evaluated by the IUCN.

== Nemertea ==
- Argonemertes stocki

== Annelids ==
- Acanthodrilus ravus
- Amynthas ambiguus
- Amynthas flavescens
- Amynthas glabrus
- Amynthas hatomajimensis
- Amynthas japonicus
- Amynthas noninvisus
- Amynthas nonmontanus
- Amynthas nonmonticolus
- Amynthas nonsetosus
- Amynthas nonsilvestris
- Amynthas obscurus
- Amynthas oyuensis
- Amynthas palarva
- Amynthas scholasticus
- Amynthas tappensis
- Amynthas toriii
- Amynthas yamizoyamensis
- Amynthas yunoshimensis
- Andiorrhinus bucki
- Andiorrhinus karinae
- Andiorrhinus pauate
- Andiorrhinus rondoniensis
- Andiorrhinus samuelensis
- North Auckland worm (Anisochaeta gigantea)
- Anisochaeta novaezealandiae
- Atatina gatesi
- Atatina puba
- Bauba santosi
- Belladrilus arua
- Brasilisia punki
- Brunodrilus angeloi
- Cirodrilus aidae
- Decachaetus forsteri
- Decachaetus violaceus
- Deinodrilus benhami
- Deinodrilus lateralis
- Deinodrilus orcus
- Deinodrilus parvus
- Deinodrilus suteri
- Diachaeta atroaris
- Diachaeta mura
- Diplotrema fallax
- Diplotrema micros
- Diplotrema montana
- Diplotrema pallida
- Diplotrema paludosa
- Diplotrema rossi
- Diporochaeta caswelli
- Diporochaeta heterochaeta
- Diporochaeta minima
- Drawida companio
- Drawida eda
- Drawida keikiensis
- Drawida tairaensis
- Drilocrius iheringi
- Duplodicodrilus acinctus
- Eukerria cuca
- Eukerria muku
- Palolo worm (Eunice viridis)
- Fimoscolex ohausi
- Fimoscolex tairim
- Fimoscolex thayeri
- Glossoscolex cathariensis
- Glossoscolex colonorum
- Glossoscolex corderoi
- Glossoscolex fachinii
- Glossoscolex fasold
- Glossoscolex gordurensis
- Glossoscolex grandis
- Glossoscolex grecoi
- Glossoscolex itaguajensis
- Glossoscolex mariarum
- Glossoscolex mrazi
- Glossoscolex palus
- Glossoscolex primaensis
- Glossoscolex robustus
- Glossoscolex sanpedroensis
- Glossoscolex tocape
- Glossoscolex truncatus
- Glossoscolex tupii
- Glossoscolex uliginosus
- Glossoscolex umijiae
- Goiascolex edgardi
- Gordiodrilus marcusi
- Haplodrilus iheringi
- Helodrilus hachiojii
- Holoscolex alatus
- Holoscolex fernandoi
- Hoplochaetina subtilis
- Kerriona garbei
- Kentucky earthworm (Komarekiona eatoni)
- Kynotus giganteus
- Leucodrilus fuscus
- Leucodrilus robustus
- Liodrilus ipu
- Lourdesia paraibaensis
- Lumbricus badensis
- Maoridrilus alpinus
- Maoridrilus intermedius
- Maoridrilus minor
- Maoridrilus pallidus
- Maoridrilus plumbeus
- Maoridrilus rubicundus
- Maoridrilus tetragonurus
- Megascolides albus
- Megascolides irregularis
- Megascolides rubicundus
- Metaphire hataii
- Metaphire tosaensis
- Metaphire vesiculata
- Neodrilus agilis
- Neodrilus campestris
- Neodrilus edwardsi
- Neogaster aidae
- Notoscolex repanga
- Notoscolex tasmani
- Ocnerodrilus ibemi
- Octochaetus kapitiensis
- Octochaetus michaelseni
- Octochaetus pelorus
- Octochaetus ravus
- Onychochaeta serieia
- Opisthodrilus rhopalopera
- Paulistus taunayi
- Perieodrilus lateralis
- Perieodrilus montanus
- Perieodrilus ricardi
- Perionychella egmonti
- Perionychella perionychopsis
- Perionychella shoeana
- Phallodriloides macmasterae
- Pickfordia tocaya
- Plagiochaeta lineata
- Plagiochaeta stewartensis
- Pontoscolex awa
- Pontoscolex eudoxiae
- Pontoscolex franzi
- Rhinodrilus adelae
- Rhinodrilus antonioi
- Rhinodrilus evandroi
- Rhinodrilus fafner
- Rhinodrilus francisci
- Rhinodrilus hoeflingae
- Rhinodrilus jucundus
- Rhinodrilus lourdesae
- Rhinodrilus mamita
- Rhinodrilus marcusae
- Rhinodrilus mortis
- Rhinodrilus panxin
- Rhinodrilus pitun
- Rhinodrilus senckenbergi
- Rhododrilus aquaticus
- Rhododrilus attenuatus
- Rhododrilus besti
- Rhododrilus cockayni
- Rhododrilus dobsoni
- Rhododrilus edulis
- Rhododrilus benhami
- Rhododrilus intermedius
- Rhododrilus macroceptus
- Rhododrilus mangamingi
- Rhododrilus microgaster
- Rhododrilus minutus
- Rhododrilus papaensis
- Rhododrilus parvus
- Rhododrilus rosae
- Rhododrilus sexpapillatus
- Rhododrilus sutherlandi
- Rhododrilus tetratheca
- Righiodrilus amazonius
- Righiodrilus dithecae
- Righiodrilus itajo
- Righiodrilus moju
- Righiodrilus ortonae
- Righiodrilus uete
- Righiodrilus viseuensis
- Sylvodrilus gravus
- Thamnodrilus ohausi
- Tokea aotea
- Zebra worm (Tokea equestris)
- Tokea esculenta
- Neglected worm (Tokea neglecta)
- Tokea raglani
- Crawling toke worm (Tokea reptans)
- Red toke worm (Tokea rubra)
- Tokea sapida
- Green toke worm (Tokea viridis)
- Tupinaki parini
- Urobenus buritis
- Urobenus gitus
- Wegeneriona belenensis

== Onychophora ==
- Mesoperipatus tholloni

== Molluscs ==
There are 1988 mollusc species and 40 mollusc subspecies assessed as data deficient.

== Cnidaria ==
There are 166 species in the phylum Cnidaria assessed as data deficient.

=== Hydrozoa ===
- Millepora boschmai
- Millepora laboreli

=== Anthozoa ===
There are 164 species in the class Anthozoa assessed as data deficient.

==== Tube-dwelling anemones ====
- Arachnanthus oligopodus

==== Zoantharia ====
- Epizoanthus frenzeli
- Epizoanthus mediterraneus
- Epizoanthus paguricola
- Epizoanthus paxii
- Epizoanthus steueri
- Epizoanthus tergestinus
- Epizoanthus univittatus
- Epizoanthus vagus

==== Actiniaria ====
- Girdle anemone (Actinia cari)
- Sea mushroom (Actinia striata)
- Bunodeopsis strumosa
- Grass crack anemone (Paranemonia cinerea)
- Sea-daisy (Phymanthus pulcher)
- Segonzactis hartogi

==== Alcyonacea ====
- Clavularia carpediem
- Maasella edwardsi
- Paramuricea macrospina

=== Scleractinia ===
There are 145 species in the order Scleractinia assessed as data deficient.

===== Acroporids =====
- Acropora branchi
- Acropora cardenae
- Acropora cophodactyla
- Acropora elegantula
- Acropora exquisita
- Acropora fastigata
- Acropora fenneri
- Acropora filiformis
- Acropora forskali
- Acropora gomezi
- Acropora haimei
- Acropora halmaherae
- Acropora insignis
- Acropora japonica
- Acropora khayranensis
- Acropora lamarcki
- Acropora lianae
- Acropora maryae
- Acropora meridiana
- Acropora mirabilis
- Acropora natalensis
- Acropora navini
- Acropora orbicularis
- Acropora pagoensis
- Acropora paragemmifera
- Acropora parahemprichii
- Acropora pectinatus
- Acropora plantaginea
- Acropora proximalis
- Acropora pruinosa
- Acropora ridzwani
- Acropora rufus
- Acropora seriata
- Acropora stoddarti
- Acropora sukarnoi
- Acropora tanegashimensis
- Acropora teres
- Acropora torihalimeda
- Acropora torresiana
- Acropora vermiculata
- Acropora wallaceae
- Anacropora pillai
- Anacropora spumosa
- Astreopora eliptica
- Enigmopora darveliensis
- Isopora cylindrica
- Isopora elizabethensis
- Montipora aspergillus
- Montipora echinata
- Montipora hemispherica
- Montipora kellyi
- Montipora pachytuberculata
- Montipora taiwanensis
- Montipora vaughani
- Montipora verrilli

===== Oculinids =====
- Robust ivory tree coral (Oculina robusta)
- Delicate ivory bush coral (Oculina tenella)
- Ivory tree coral (Oculina valenciennesi)
- Schizoculina africana
- Schizoculina fissipara
- Simplastrea vesicularis

===== Poritids =====
- Alveopora ocellata
- Calathiscus tantillus
- Porites baueri
- Honycomb plate coral (Porites colonensis)
- Porites decasepta
- Porites ericacea
- Porites evermanni
- Porites flavus
- Porites pukoensis

===== Mussids =====
- Indophyllia macassarensis
- Micromussa diminuta
- Mussismilia braziliensis
- Mussismilia harttii
- Mussismilia hispida
- Ridgeless cactus coral (Mycetophyllia reesi)
- Scolymia wellsi

===== Pectiniids =====
- Echinophyllia pectinata
- Mycedium spina
- Oxypora convoluta
- Oxypora egyptensis
- Pectinia crassa

===== Siderastreids =====
- Psammocora albopicta
- Psammocora decussata
- Psammocora interstinctus
- Psammocora ramosa
- Psammocora verrilli
- Siderastrea stellata

===== Other Scleractinia species =====
- Fragile saucer coral (Agaricia fragilis)
- Scroll coral (Agaricia undata)
- Merulina coral (Boninastrea boninensis)
- Caryophyllia solida
- Cladopsammia rolandi
- Concentrotheca vaughani
- Crispatotrochus galapagensis
- Dendrophyllia johnsoni
- Echinopora grandicula
- Echinopora irregularis
- Echinopora tiranensis
- Endopsammia pourtalesi
- Favia leptophylla
- Flabellum daphnense
- Madracis asanoi
- Pointed pencil coral (Madracis asperula)
- Madracis carmabi
- Brazilian rose coral (Meandrina braziliensis)
- Montigyra kenti
- Pavona xarifae
- Plerogyra cauliformis
- Plerogyra diabolotus
- Plerogyra multilobata
- Pocillopora effusus
- Pocillopora molokensis
- Podabacia sinai
- Pseudocyathoceras avis
- Stylocoeniella muscosus

== Arthropods ==
There are 2875 arthropod species and 17 arthropod subspecies assessed as data deficient.

== Echinoderms ==
There are 244 echinoderm species assessed as data deficient.

=== Sea cucumbers ===
- Actinopyga albonigra
- Actinopyga bacilla
- Actinopyga bannwarthi
- Blue sea cucumber (Actinopyga caerulea)
- Hairy sea cucumber (Actinopyga capillata)
- Actinopyga fusca
- Stonefish (Actinopyga lecanora)
- Plump sea cucumber (Actinopyga obesa)
- Actinopyga serratidens
- Pacific white-spotted sea cucumber (Actinopyga varians)
- Allopatides corrugatus
- Allopatides dendroeides
- Amphigymnas multipes
- Apostichopus johnsoni
- Apostichopus multidentis
- Apostichopus nigripunctatus
- Apostichopus nipponensis
- Argiodia maculata
- Bathyplotes baculosus
- Bathyplotes bigelowi
- Bathyplotes bongraini
- Bathyplotes cinctus
- Bathyplotes crenulata
- Bathyplotes gourdoni
- Bathyplotes imperfectus
- Bathyplotes moseleyi
- Bathyplotes phlegmaticus
- Bathyplotes punctatus
- Bathyplotes roseus
- Bathyplotes rubicundus
- Bathyplotes spuma
- Bathyplotes sulcatus
- Bathyplotes tizardi
- Benthothuria distorta
- Benthothuria fusiformis
- Bohadschia atra
- Bohadschia koellikeri
- Chalky cucumber (Bohadschia marmorata)
- Bohadschia mitsioensis
- Bohadschia paradoxa
- Brownspotted sandfish (Bohadschia similis)
- Bohadschia steinitzi
- Bohadschia subrubra
- Bohadschia tenuissima
- Brown sea cucumber (Bohadschia vitiensis)
- Eostichopus arnesoni
- Holothuria aculeata
- Holothuria aemula
- Holothuria albifasciatus
- Holothuria albiventer
- Holothuria albofusca
- Holothuria altaturricula
- Holothuria annulifera
- Holothuria aphanes
- Holothuria arenicola
- Holothuria arguinensis
- Holothuria asperita
- Holothuria bacilla
- Holothuria brauni
- Holothuria cadelli
- Holothuria caparti
- Holothuria casoae
- Holothuria cavans
- Holothuria chilensis
- Holothuria conica
- Holothuria conusalba
- Holothuria coronopertusa
- Holothuria crosnieri
- Holothuria cumulus
- Holothuria dicorona
- Holothuria discrepans
- Holothuria dofleinii
- Holothuria duoturricula
- Holothuria duoturriforma
- Holothuria dura
- Holothuria enalia
- Holothuria excellens
- Holothuria exilis
- Holothuria flavocastanea
- Holothuria foresti
- Holothuria fuligina
- Holothuria fuscorubra
- Holothuria glandifera
- Holothuria gracilis
- Holothuria granosa
- Holothuria hamata
- Holothuria hartmeyeri
- Holothuria horrida
- Holothuria huberti
- Bottleneck sea cucumber (Holothuria impatiens)
- Holothuria inornata
- Holothuria integra
- Holothuria jousseaumei
- Holothuria kefersteinii
- Holothuria klunzingeri
- Holothuria kubaryi
- Holothuria lineata
- Holothuria longicosta
- Holothuria macroperona
- Holothuria mactanensis
- Holothuria maculosa
- Holothuria mammosa
- Holothuria martensii
- Holothuria massaspicula
- Holothuria michaelseni
- Holothuria milloti
- Holothuria minax
- Holothuria modesta
- Holothuria multipilula
- Holothuria nigralutea
- Holothuria notabilis
- Holothuria olivacea
- Holothuria papillata
- Holothuria papillifera
- Holothuria parva
- Holothuria portovallartensis
- Holothuria pseudonotabilis
- Holothuria pulla
- Holothuria pyxis
- Holothuria pyxoides
- Holothuria remollescens
- Holothuria riojai
- Holothuria rowei
- Holothuria samoana
- Holothuria sinefibula
- Holothuria sinica
- Holothuria spinifera
- Holothuria squamifera
- Holothuria stellati
- Holothuria stocki
- Holothuria strigosa
- Holothuria submersa
- Holothuria sucosa
- Holothuria sulcata
- Holothuria suspecta
- Holothuria theeli
- Holothuria tortonesei
- Holothuria tripilata
- Holothuria truncata
- Holothuria tuberculata
- Holothuria turrisimperfecta
- Holothuria unica
- Holothuria vemae
- Holothuria vittalonga
- Holothuria zihuatanensis
- Labidodemas pseudosemperianum
- Labidodemas quadripartitum
- Labidodemas spineum
- Mesothuria abberviata
- Mesothuria bifurcata
- Mesothuria candelabra
- Mesothuria carnosa
- Mesothuria cathedralis
- Mesothuria connectens
- Mesothuria crebrapedes
- Mesothuria edwardensis
- Mesothuria expectans
- Mesothuria holothurioides
- Mesothuria incerta
- Mesothuria marginata
- Mesothuria maroccana
- Mesothuria milleri
- Mesothuria multipora
- Mesothuria oktaknemoides
- Mesothuria oktaknemus
- Mesothuria regularia
- Mesothuria roulei
- Mesothuria squamosa
- Mesothuria sufflava
- Mesothuria thomsoni
- Mesothuria triradiata
- Mesothuria verrilli
- Molpadiodemas atlanticus
- Molpadiodemas crinitus
- Molpadiodemas depressus
- Molpadiodemas helios
- Molpadiodemas involutus
- Molpadiodemas morbillus
- Molpadiodemas neovillosus
- Molpadiodemas pediculus
- Molpadiodemas pustulosus
- Molpadiodemas translucens
- Molpadiodemas ustulatus
- Neostichopus grammatus
- Neostichopus mollis
- Paelopatides atlantica
- Paelopatides confundens
- Paelopatides dissidens
- Paelopatides gelatinosa
- Paelopatides gigantea
- Paelopatides grisea
- Paelopatides illicitus
- Paelopatides insignis
- Paelopatides modestus
- Paelopatides mollis
- Paelopatides ovalis
- Paelopatides quadridens
- Paelopatides solea
- Paelopatides suspecta
- Paelopatides verrucosus
- Parastichopus nigripunctatus
- Parastichopus tremulus
- Paroriza pallens
- Paroriza prohoi
- Paroriza verrucosa
- Perizona magna
- Pseudostichopus aemaulatus
- Pseudostichopus echinatus
- Pseudostichopus langeae
- Pseudostichopus mollis
- Pseudostichopus occulatatus
- Pseudostichopus papillatus
- Pseudostichopus peripatus
- Pseudostichopus profundi
- Pseudostichopus spiculiferus
- Pseudostichopus tuberosus
- Stichopus anapinusus
- Stichopus ellipes
- Peanutfish (Stichopus horrens)
- Stichopus ludwigi
- Stichopus monotuberculatus
- Stichopus ocellatus
- Stichopus paradoxus
- Stichopus pseudohorrens
- Stichopus quadrifasciatus
- Stichopus rubermaculosus
- Synallactes angustus
- Synallactes chuni
- Synallactes crebrapapilla
- Synallactes discoidalis
- Synallactes elongata
- Synallactes laguardai
- Synallactes longipapillata
- Synallactes mollis
- Synallactes multivesiculatus
- Synallactes pellucidus
- Synallactes rigidus
- Synallactes robertsoni
- Synallactes samyni
- Synallactes triplax
- Synallactes viridilimus
- Amberfish (Thelenota anax)

== See also ==
- Lists of IUCN Red List data deficient species
- List of least concern invertebrates
- List of near threatened invertebrates
- List of vulnerable invertebrates
- List of endangered invertebrates
- List of critically endangered invertebrates
- List of recently extinct invertebrates
