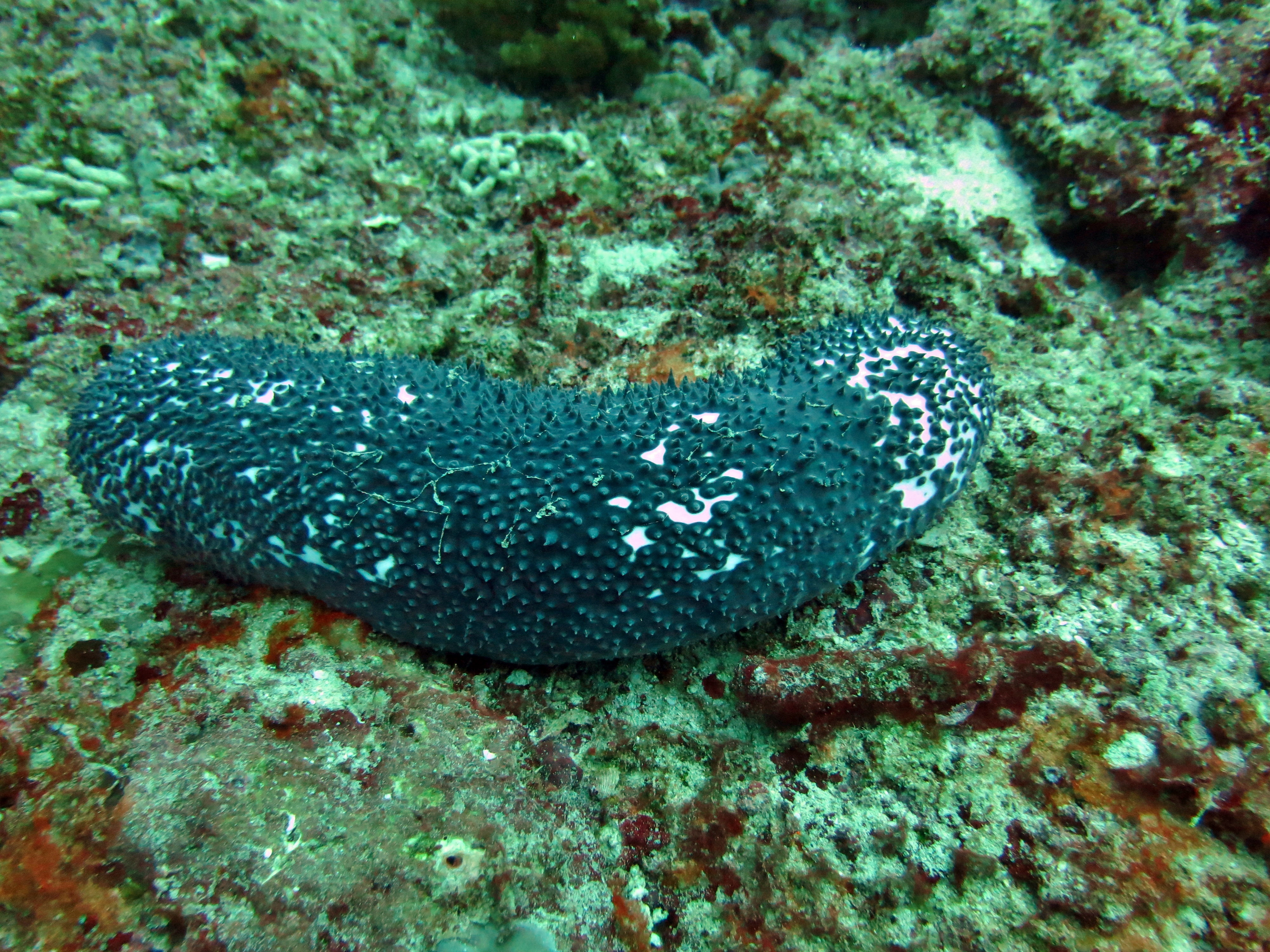

Conservation status
- Data Deficient (IUCN 3.1)

Scientific classification
- Kingdom: Animalia
- Phylum: Echinodermata
- Class: Holothuroidea
- Order: Holothuriida
- Family: Holothuriidae
- Genus: Actinopyga
- Species: A. caerulea

Binomial name
- Actinopyga caerulea Samyn, VandenSpiegel, Massin, 2006
- Actinopyga caerulea distribution map

= Actinopyga caerulea =

Species of sea cucumber

Actinopyga caerulea, the blue sea cucumber, is a species of sea cucumber in the family Holothuriidae. Named for its unique blue coloration, this species can be found along the continental shelf of the tropical Western Indo-Pacific region, at depths between 12 and 45 m (39 and 148 ft). It is a commercially important species, and is harvested for food along its range.

== Etymology ==
The specific epithet, caerulea, is derived from the Latin caeruleus, meaning "blue or greenish-blue; cerulean, azure." This is in reference to its distinctive blue coloration, which is also the origin of its vernacular name, the blue sea cucumber.

== Taxonomy ==
While Actinopyga caerulea was first discovered and photographed off the coast of New Caledonia in 1984, it was initially misidentified as Actinopyga crassa, and none were collected for further study. The species was photographed at a number of Pacific localities throughout the next decade, including Sulawesi, Bali, and Thailand, but it would not be accurately recognized as a undescribed species until 1998, when Australian zoologist F.W.E. Rowe identified a specimen photographed in the Philippines by Erhardt & Baensch as Actinopyga (?) bannwarthi. In 2003, several specimens were collected in Comoros and Papua New Guinea by Yves Samyn, Didier VandenSpiegel, and Claude Massin, who formally described the new species as Actinopyga caerulea in 2006.

The holotype specimen of this species (RMCA 1803) was collected by Samyn and VandenSpiegel on November 22, 2003, and is deposited in the zoology collections of the Royal Museum for Central Africa, Tervuren, Belgium. The type locality is off the coast of Iconi (Ikoni), Grande Comore, Comoros, at a depth of 37 m (121 ft). The four paratype specimens (CNDRS 2004.09, RBINS IG 30376, NMHN EcHo 8081, and NHM 2005.2405) were also collected off the coast of Grande Comore, at depths ranging from 21 to 28 m (69 to 92 ft).

=== Phylogeny and evolutionary history ===
Actinopyga caerulea was initially identified by Samyn et al., 2006 to be a member of the echinites group, a paraphyletic group within the genus Actinopyga which consisted of A. echinites, A. agassizii, A. bannwarthi, A. crassa, A. flammea, A. serratidens, and the now-obsolete A. plebeja (today considered to be synonymous with A. echinites).

However, a DNA barcoding study published in 2010 revealed that the closest known relative of Actinopyga caerulea is actually Actinopyga lecanora, and that the two species comprise a sister group within the genus with a genetic distance of just 0.9%. In fact, the two species are so closely related that their taxonomic validity has been called into question: there is a possibility that one of them could be a hybrid species between the other and their next-closest relative, Actinopyga obesa.

== Distribution and habitat ==
Actinopyga caerulea is found off the coasts of Asia and Africa, in the tropical Indian Ocean and the western Pacific Ocean. Its range extends from Comoros to Indonesia, Papua New Guinea, the Philippines, Taiwan, and other island groups in the western Pacific. It is found on the seabed in deeper tropical water on sand and rubble, as well as coral patches on the edge of coral reefs, at depths between 12 and 45 m (40 and 150 ft). It is also associated with garden eel plains.

== Anatomy and description ==
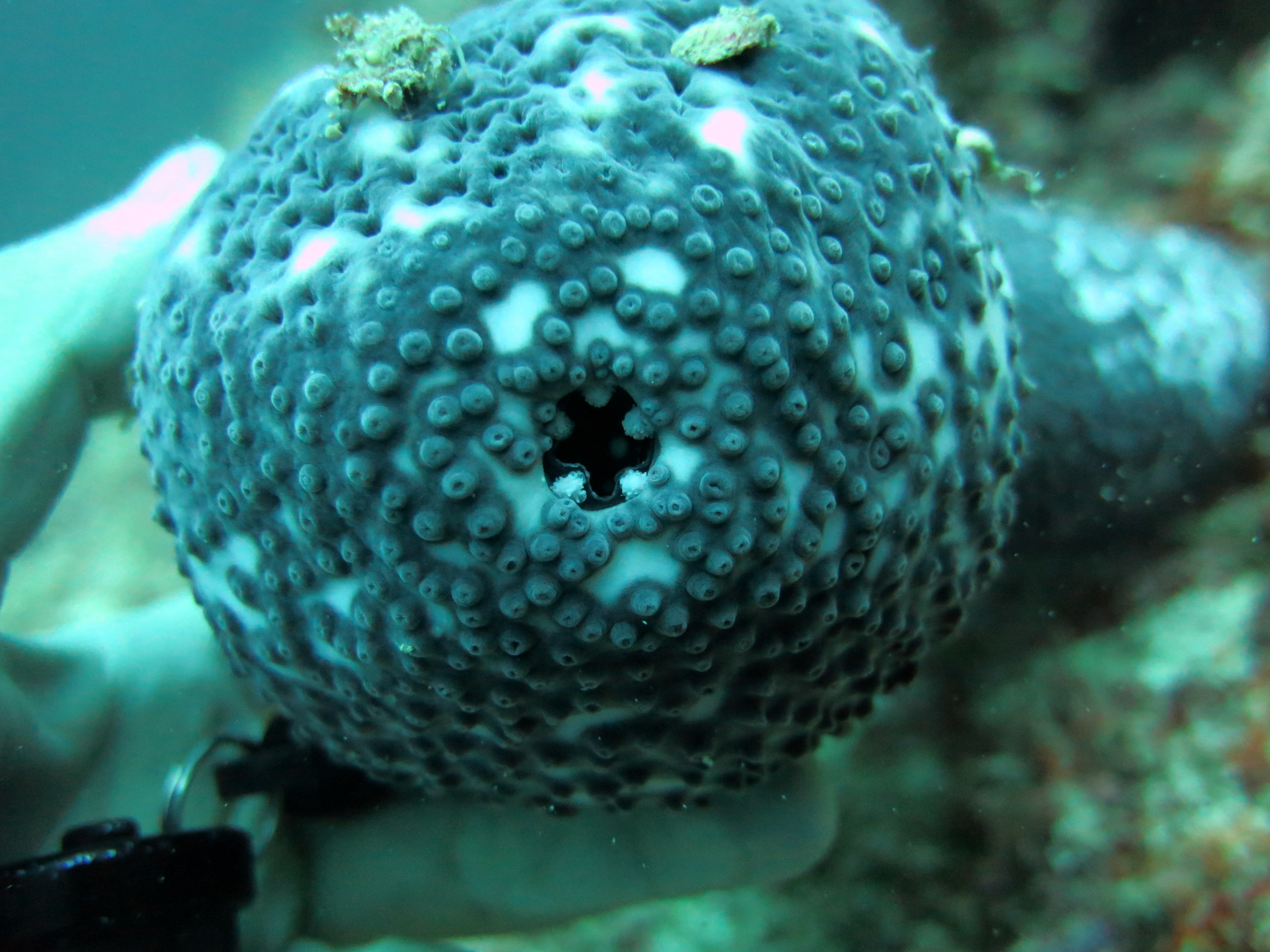
A specimen found in the Maldives (Baa Atoll) Note the five distinctive anal teeth surrounding the anus.

Actinopyga caerulea is a large sea cucumber, growing to a length of up to 400 mm (16 in) and a width of up to 140 mm (6 in) across the midsection. The body of this sea cucumber is white, with numerous dark blue tube feet and papillae discontinuously covering its surface. The density of these tube feet and papillae, and therefore an individual's coloration, can vary from sea cucumber to sea cucumber, but density typically increases on the dorsal area.

The body itself is stout and loaf-shaped, with a smooth, firm body wall measuring up to 14 mm (1 in) thick. The mouth is usually surrounded by 15-18 large shield-shaped feeding tentacles, which are bluish-grey in coloration. The anus is surrounded by five prominent "anal teeth" (heavily-calcified tube feet, see picture), which are white in coloration. This species lacks Cuvierian tubules. It has one club-shaped Polian vesicle, which is roughly one-seventh of its body length in preserved specimens.

=== Body composition ===
In 2010, thirty (30) individual Actinopyga caerulea were purchased from a seafood market in Guangzhou, China as part of a study on the chemical composition and nutritional quality of several commercially important species of sea cucumbers. The percent composition of A. caerulea was approximately 0.81% (±0.03) moisture, 56.9% (±0.36) protein, 10.1 (±0.25) fat, and 28.4% (±0.32) "ash."^{[note 1]} Compared to other sea cucumbers, A. caerulea had comparatively higher fat content and levels of omega-3 fatty acids, but less overall nutritional value than Thelenota ananas, Bohadschia argus, and its congener Actinopyga mauritiana.

== Ecology and behavior ==
Actinopyga caerulea is a detrivore, and forages during the day for organic detritus along sandy plains and coral patches on the outer slopes of coral reefs.

=== Reproduction and life cycle ===
Like many other members of the class Holothuroidea, blue sea cucumbers are gonochoric, and only have a single gonad. During spawning season, eggs and sperm are externally released into the surrounding water by female and male individuals, respectively, and are fertilized when they meet.

=== Commensal relationships ===
The emperor shrimp (Zenopontonia rex) is known to inhabit the surface of Actinopyga caerulea in a commensal relationship, possibly feeding on ectoparasites or organic detritus on the surface of its skin. There is also at least one recorded instance of Pleurosicya mossambica living on it off the coast of Bitung.

== Conservation status ==
As of its latest assessment in 2010, the IUCN Red List considers Actinopyga caerulea to be a data deficient species. It has a wide geographic distribution, but is considered a rare species across its range, which makes the collection of accurate population data difficult. It is harvested commercially for food in some parts of its range, and is used in the production of bêche-de-mer in Papua New Guinea; however, to what extent commercial activities impact its population is currently unknown. Its distribution overlaps with at least one marine protected area (MPA).

== Notes ==
^{1} All holothurian specimens in the study were incinerated after their moisture, protein, and fat percent compositions were recorded. "Ash" is a catch-all referring to anything not moisture, protein, and fat that was fully incinerated: e.g. ossicles, calcareous rings, gut contents.
