= Muelleria =

Muelleria may refer to:

- Muelleria (alga), a genus of diatoms in the family Naviculaceae
- Muelleria (holothurian), a synonym for a genus of sea cucumbers, Actinopyga
- Muelleria (journal), a peer-reviewed scientific journal on botany published by the Royal Botanic Gardens Melbourne
