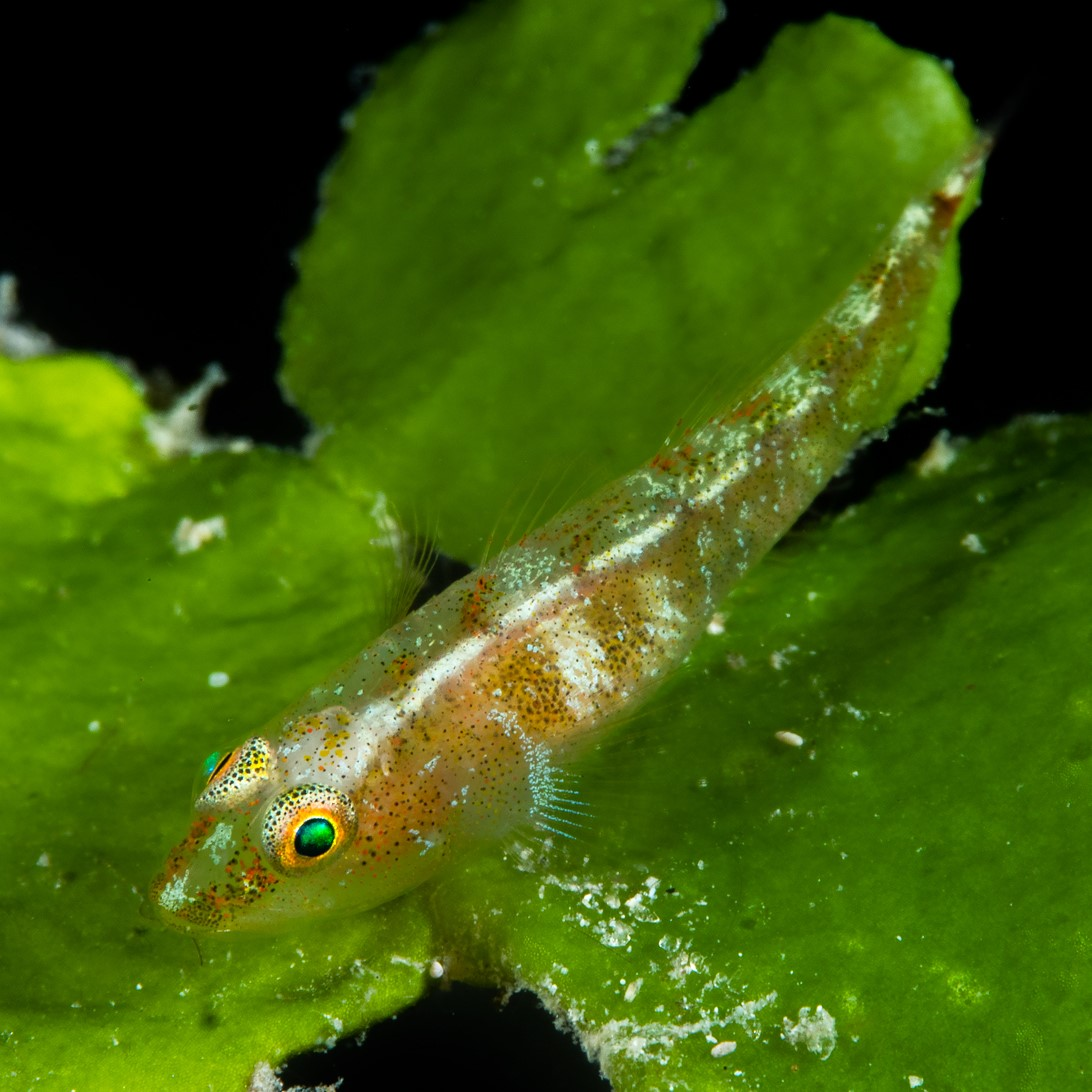

Conservation status
- Near Threatened (IUCN 3.1)

Scientific classification
- Kingdom: Animalia
- Phylum: Chordata
- Class: Actinopterygii
- Division: Teleostei
- Order: Gobiiformes
- Family: Gobiidae
- Genus: Pleurosicya
- Species: P. bilobata

Binomial name
- Pleurosicya bilobata (Koumans, 1941)

Synonyms
- Cottogobius bilobatus Koumans, 1941; Pleurosicya bilobatus (Koumans, 1941)

= Pleurosicya bilobata =

Species of fish

Pleurosicya bilobata, also known as bilobed ghost goby, seagrass ghost goby, and split-tongue cling-goby, is a species of goby found in the Indo-Pacific from India to the Moluccas, and north to the Ryukyu Islands.

== Description ==
This species reaches a length of 3.0 cm (1.2 in).
