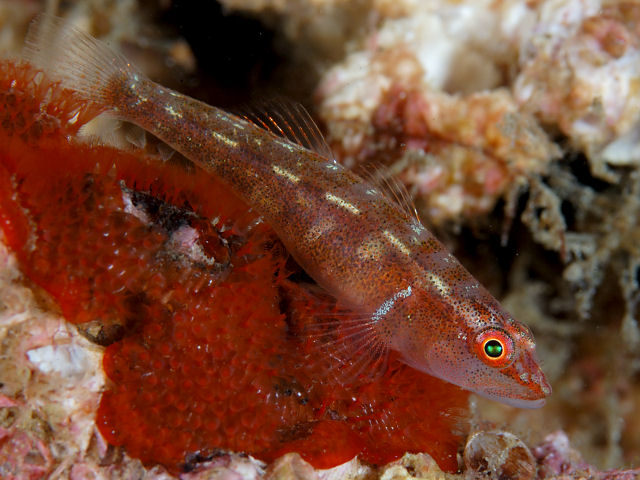

Conservation status
- Least Concern (IUCN 3.1)

Scientific classification
- Kingdom: Animalia
- Phylum: Chordata
- Class: Actinopterygii
- Order: Gobiiformes
- Family: Gobiidae
- Genus: Pleurosicya
- Species: P. mossambica

Binomial name
- Pleurosicya mossambica J. L. B. Smith, 1959

Synonyms
- Pleurosicya sinaia Goren, 1984

= Pleurosicya mossambica =

Species of fish

Pleurosicya mossambica, also known as the toothy goby or the Mozambique ghost goby, is a species of goby native to the tropical coastal waters and coral reefs of the Red Sea and western Indo-Pacific. Like many other gobies, it forms commensal relationships with several species of marine invertebrates, including soft corals and sponges.

== Taxonomy and etymology ==
Pleurosicya mossambica was first described by South African ichthyologist J. L. B. Smith in 1959.

Its generic name, Pleurosicya, is derived from the Greek words pleura, meaning side, and sikya, as in cucumber. Its species name, mossambica, refers to Mozambique, the region in which it was first discovered.

== Description ==
Pleurosicya mossambica is a small goby, growing to a maximum recorded length of 3 cm (1 in). It is a pale red in coloration, and the body is partially translucent. It has seven dorsal spines, seven to eight dorsal soft rays, one anal spine, and eight anal soft rays. The eyes are prominent with red and yellow rings, and are positioned at roughly 45 degrees on each side of the head to allow it a greater field of vision. Their pelvic fins have evolved into sucker-like appendages, which allow them to attach themselves to corals in high-current areas.

== Distribution and habitat ==
Pleurosicya mossambica is native to the greater western Indo-Pacific region. The limits of its range extend as far west as the Red Sea and the eastern African coastline, as far east as Fiji and the Marquesas Islands, as far north as southern Japan, and as far south as southeastern Australia and New Caledonia. It can be found in coastal bays and reef slopes, most commonly near one of its many hosts, at depths between 2 and 30 m (10 and 100 ft).

== Ecology and behavior ==
Pleurosicya mossambica lives amongst a variety of plant and invertebrate hosts, including soft corals, sponges, Tridacna, broad-blade plants, algae, and bivalves. There is at least one recorded instance of it living among the blue sea cucumber (Actinopyga caerulea) off the coast of Sulawesi, Indonesia.

=== Diet ===
The diet of Pleurosicya mossambica primarily consists of zooplankton, as well as mucus and polyps off of corals.

=== Reproduction ===
Pleurosicya mossambica is a protogynous species, meaning that they are sequential hermaphrodites with female sexual organs reaching maturity before male sexual organs. It is a benthic spawner, typically depositing its eggs on ascidians or soft corals.

== Conservation status ==
Due to the wide geographic distribution of this species and lack of significant threats to its survival, the IUCN Red List considers Pleurosicya mossambica to be a least-concern species. While not explicitly protected by law, its native range overlaps with several protected areas, including the Great Barrier Reef Marine Park in Australia and the Natural Park of the Coral Sea in New Caledonia.
