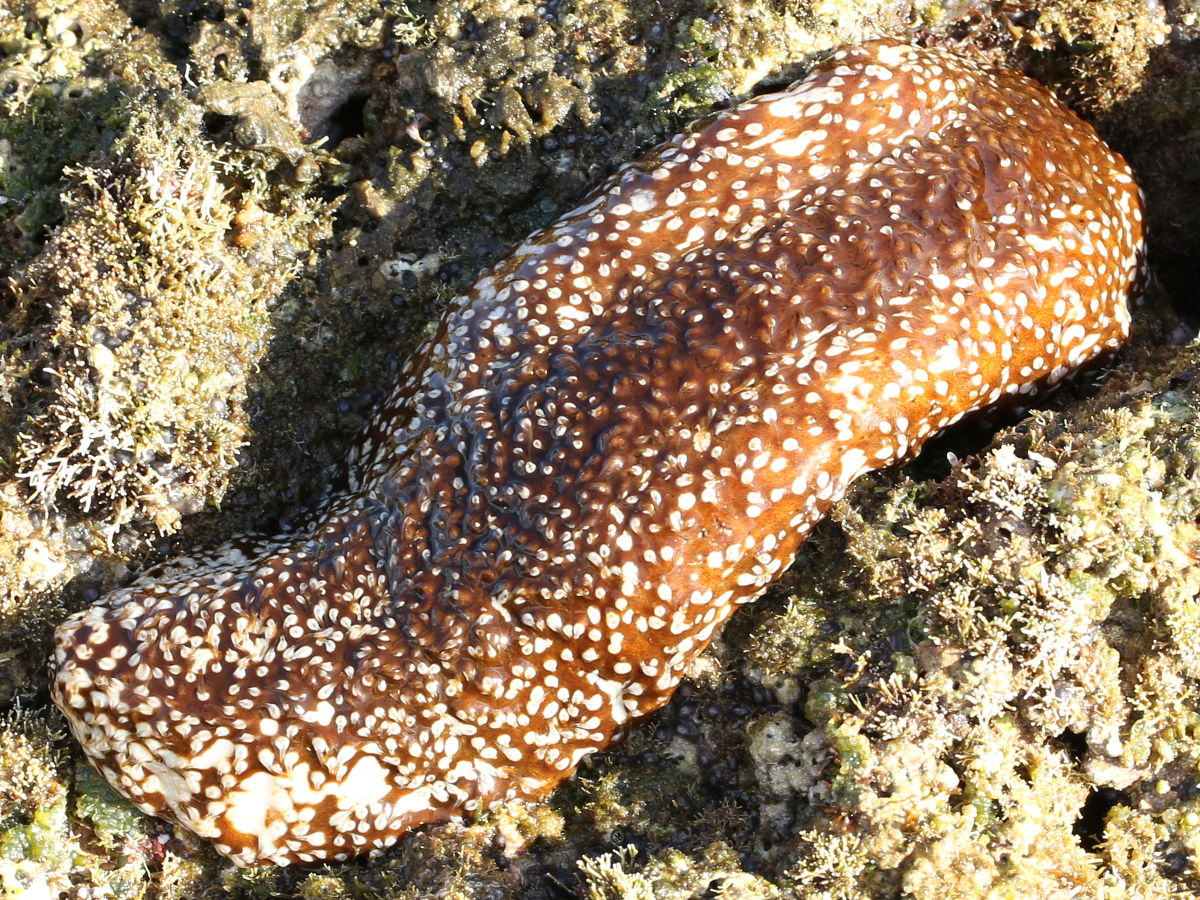

Conservation status
- Data Deficient (IUCN 3.1)

Scientific classification
- Kingdom: Animalia
- Phylum: Echinodermata
- Class: Holothuroidea
- Order: Holothuriida
- Family: Holothuriidae
- Genus: Actinopyga
- Species: A. varians

Binomial name
- Actinopyga varians (Selenka, 1867)

Synonyms
- Holothuria (Psolus) monacaria Lesson, 1830; Holothuria guamensis Quoy & Gaimard, 1834; Mülleria varians Selenka, 1867

= Actinopyga varians =

Species of sea cucumber

Actinopyga varians, the Pacific white-spotted sea cucumber or Hawaiian sea cucumber, is a species of sea cucumber in the family Holothuriidae. It is found in the Pacific Ocean near Hawaii and also in the Indo-Pacific Ocean.

== Distribution and habitat ==
Actinopyga varians is found in tropical waters, commonly seen in the Western Pacific and the Indo-Pacific. It has been seen in Hawaii, Fiji, the French Polynesia and other islands in Micronesia. It tends to live in depths of about 0–25 m on living corals and surrounding rubble areas of reefs on the crest of the ocean floor.

== Description ==
The size of this species ranges from 15 cm to 20 cm (6 to 8 in.). The bivium is hard, is dark red or brown with distinct white spots, and can be wrinkled. Although the bivium is hard, all holothuroids have a reduced skeleton of isolated ossicles in the body wall. A distinct characteristic of the Actinopyga genus are the teeth surrounding the anus. However, this trait is not exclusive to the Actinopyga genus, and some other Holothuria can have similar characteristics. The Holothuriidae family, which the Actinopyga varians is a part of, is are known to have thick fleshy bodies and rows of tube feet. Papillae, which are blunt projections, cover the body. Their spicules are shaped like tubes and although most species in the Holothuriidae family are able to eject cuvierian tubules in self-defense, the genera Actinopyga is unable to do so. One of the main distinguishing feature of the order Holothuriida, of which the family Holothuriidae is a part of, is the leaf-like tentacles that surround the mouth, which aids in feeding.

== Diet ==
Actinopyga varians are detritivores and trap particles and plankton on their tentacles. The papillae of the tentacles hold cells that secrete the mucus, which the particles and plankton are stuck on to. They are highly selective deposit feeders and generally consume highly organic material. The tentacles surround the mouth, which from the mouth goes to the esophagus, then the foregut to the intestine. This is where digestion occurs.

== Reproduction ==
Although not much is known about the reproductive habits of Actinopyga varians, members of the class Holothuroidea are gonochoric and have only one gonad. Spawning and fertilization are external; furthermore, species in the same genus, such as the Actinopyga mauritiana, have shown that although there are many physical, chemical and biological cues that have been used to successfully stimulate spawning, thermal stimulation is the most successful method of reproduction.

== Development ==
Echinoderms are deuterostomes. The larvae begin with a bilateral symmetrical embryo, and pass through several stages before reaching adulthood. The larvae have a three-part paired coelom that eventually develop into different parts. The first stage of the larve is auricularia, which starts after three days. This first stage has a ciliated locomotor band which leads into the next stage where the ciliated band breaks up into "girdles" in a stage called doliolaria.

Eventually, after the larval metamorphosis, the sea cucumber settles down and becomes a fully grown species.

== Predation ==
Sea cucumbers, as a species, are most vulnerable in the larval and juvenile stages; thus, they face predation most often during these stages. It is known that starfish, fish, gastropods and crustaceans are predators.

== Uses ==
Although sea cucumbers have been known as a delicacy in many cultures, including those in the Pacific Islands, Actinopyga varians has not been known to be one of the edible species of sea cucumbers; however, Actinopyga mauritiana, a species in the Actinopyga The only known edible species in the Actinopyga genus is Actinopyga mauritiana. In China a similar species in the same genus, Actinopyga echinites, is held valuable for its pharmacological compound. It is unknown if the Actinopyga varians holds the same compounds that are thought of as valuable for such purposes.
