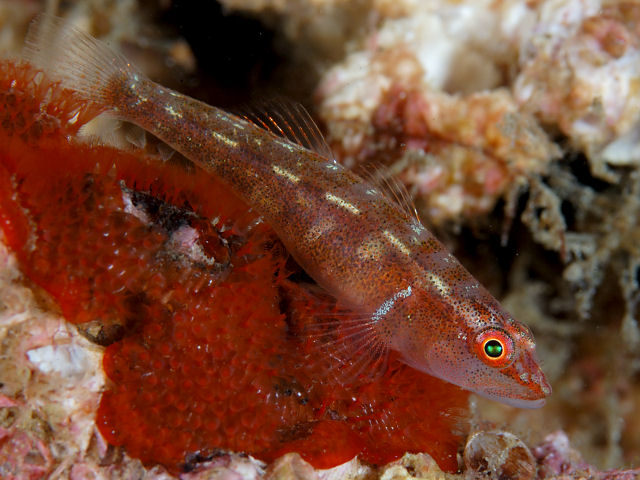
- Pleurosicya mossambica
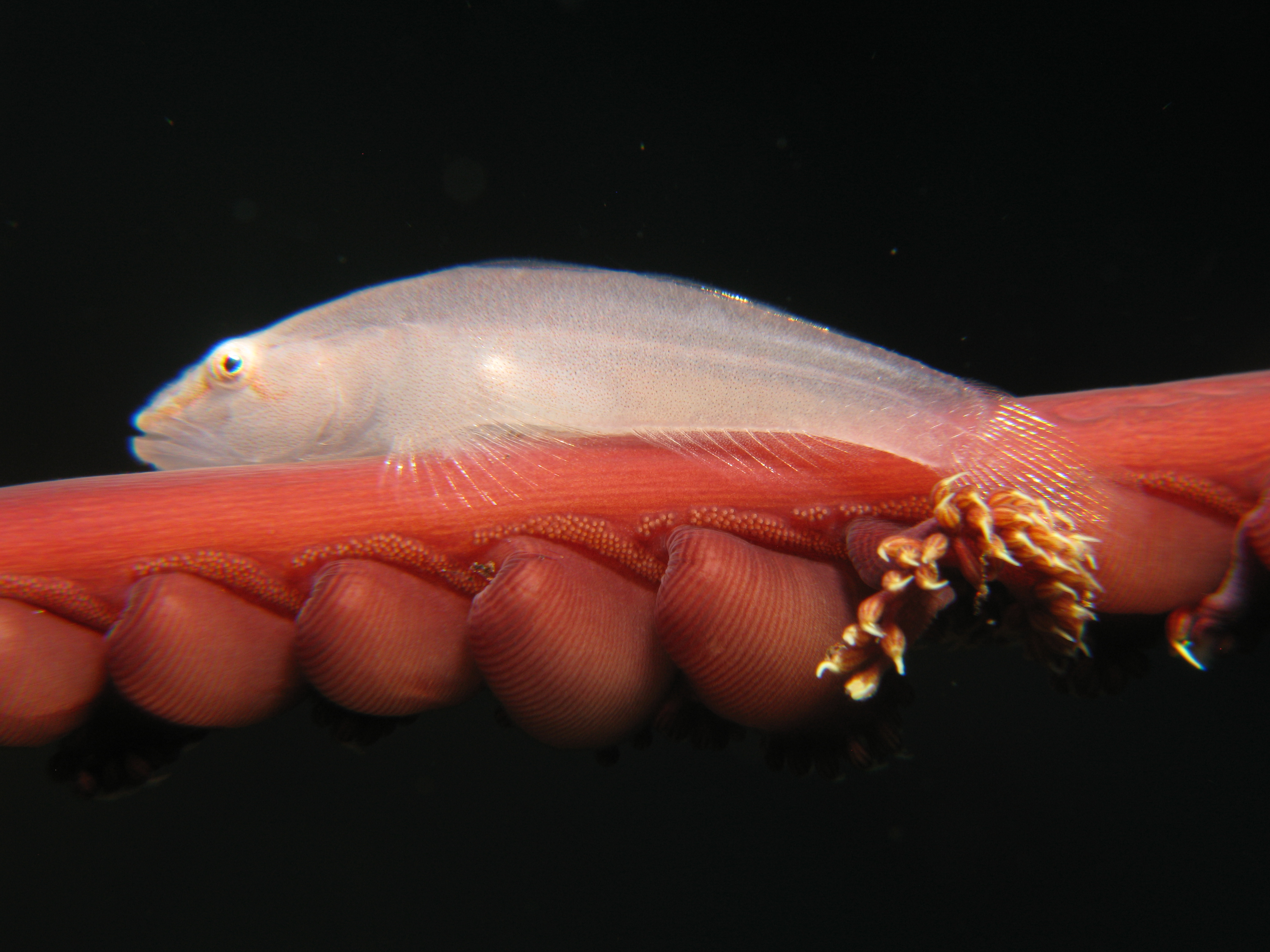
- Ghost Goby on Seapen (Pleurosicya boldinghi)

Scientific classification
- Kingdom: Animalia
- Phylum: Chordata
- Class: Actinopterygii
- Order: Gobiiformes
- Family: Gobiidae
- Genus: Pleurosicya; M. C. W. Weber, 1913

Type species
- Pleurosicya boldinghi M. C. W. Weber, 1913

= Pleurosicya =

Genus of fishes

Pleurosicya is a genus of gobies native to reef environments of the Indian Ocean and the western Pacific Ocean.

== Species ==
As of 2024, FishBase recognizes 18 species in this genus as valid:

- Pleurosicya annandalei Hornell & Fowler, 1922 (Scaly-nape goby)
- Pleurosicya australis Larson, 1990
- Pleurosicya bilobata (Koumans, 1941) (Bilobed ghostgoby)
- Pleurosicya boldinghi M. C. W. Weber, 1913 (Soft-coral goby)
- Pleurosicya carolinensis Larson, 1990 (Caroline Islands ghostgoby)
- Pleurosicya coerulea Larson, 1990 (Blue-coral ghostgoby)
- Pleurosicya elongata Larson, 1990 (Cling goby)
- Pleurosicya fringilla Larson, 1990 (Staghorn ghostgoby)
- Pleurosicya labiata (M. C. W. Weber, 1913) (Barrel-sponge ghostgoby)
- Pleurosicya larsonae D. W. Greenfield & J. E. Randall, 2004
- Pleurosicya micheli Fourmanoir, 1971 (Michel's ghostgoby, also Stony coral ghostgoby)
- Pleurosicya mossambica J. L. B. Smith, 1959 (Toothy goby)
- Pleurosicya muscarum (D. S. Jordan & Seale, 1906) (Ghost goby)
- Pleurosicya occidentalis Larson, 1990
- Pleurosicya plicata Larson, 1990 (Plicata ghostgoby)
- Pleurosicya prognatha Goren, 1984 (Folded ghostgoby)
- Pleurosicya sinaia Goren, 1984
- Pleurosicya spongicola Larson, 1990 (Sponge ghostgoby)

However, the validity of Pleurosicya sinaia as a taxon is heavily disputed, and it is generally considered to be a junior synonym of Pleurosicya mossambica.
