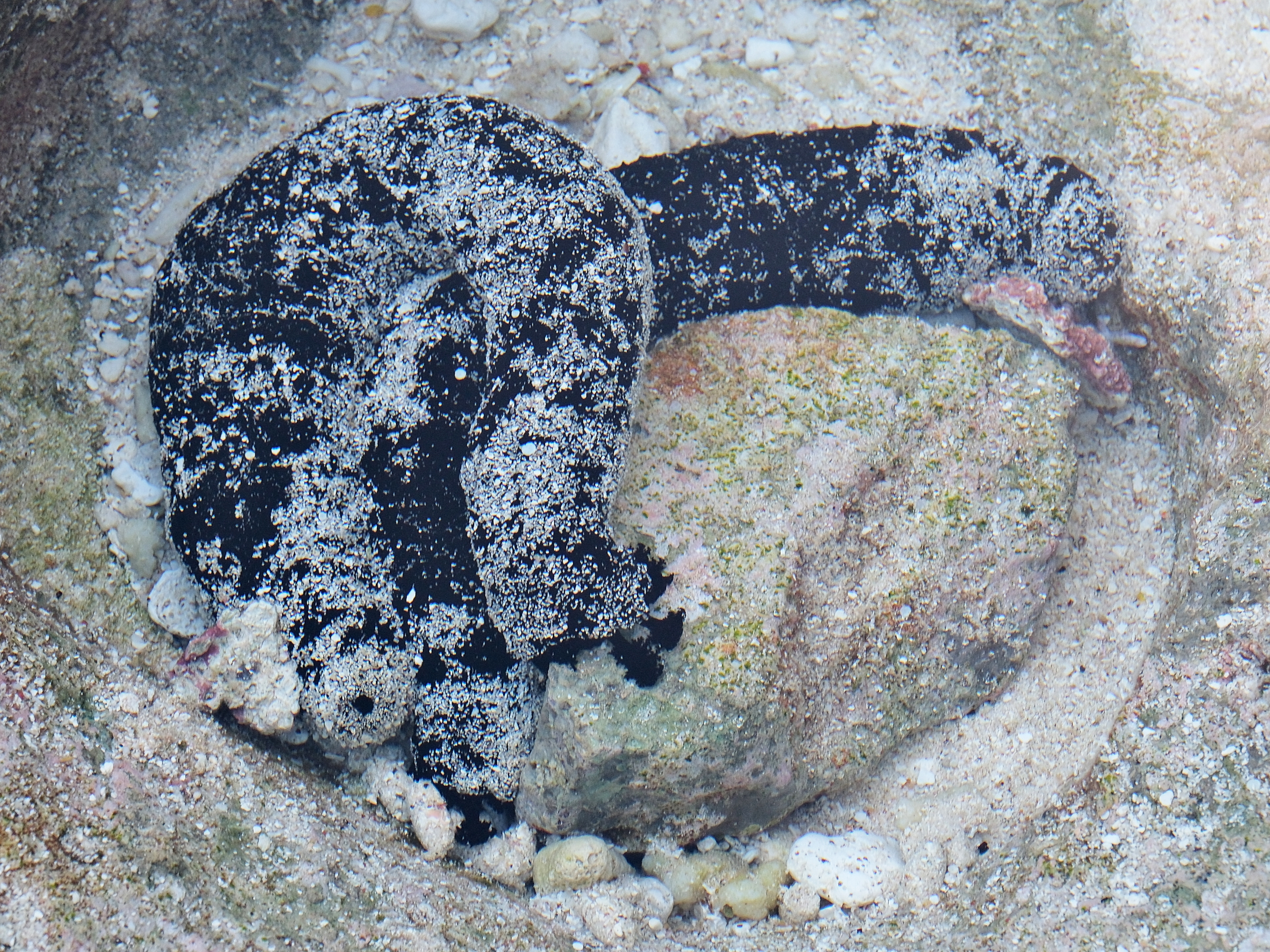

Conservation status
- Least Concern (IUCN 3.1)

Scientific classification
- Kingdom: Animalia
- Phylum: Echinodermata
- Class: Holothuroidea
- Order: Holothuriida
- Family: Holothuriidae
- Genus: Actinopyga
- Species: A. palauensis

Binomial name
- Actinopyga palauensis Panning, 1944

Synonyms
- Actinopyga obesa palauensis Panning, 1944

= Actinopyga palauensis =

Species of sea cucumber

Actinopyga palauensis, the Panning's blackfish, is a species of sea cucumber within the family Holothuriidae. The species distribution is in the western Pacific near areas such as Palau, the Federated States of Micronesia, Tonga, Niue, eastern Australia, and New Caledonia. It lives in reef environments at depths up to 30 meters, often being found crawling on sandy reef slopes, course sand with reef rubble, semi-sheltered bay reefs, and is occasionally found in lagoons and inshore reefs.

Actinopyga palauensis is blackish-brown in coloration, but appears entirely black at depth, with a bumpy texture and small sparse papillae. The teeth are orange and noticeably rough. It grows to a max length of 40 centimeters, but individuals are more commonly found at 30 centimetres (12 in). It can weigh up to 500 grams (18 oz). The max reported age of an individual was 6 years.

== Conservation ==
Actinopyga palauensis is commonly fished in many parts of its range, however it is considered a minor commercial species in terms of catch, and no catch records suggest that the current population of the species is declining from being harvested. No conservation measures have been made towards the species, but it does occur in at least one marine protected area within its range. For these reasons the IUCN Red List has classified the species as 'Least concern'.
