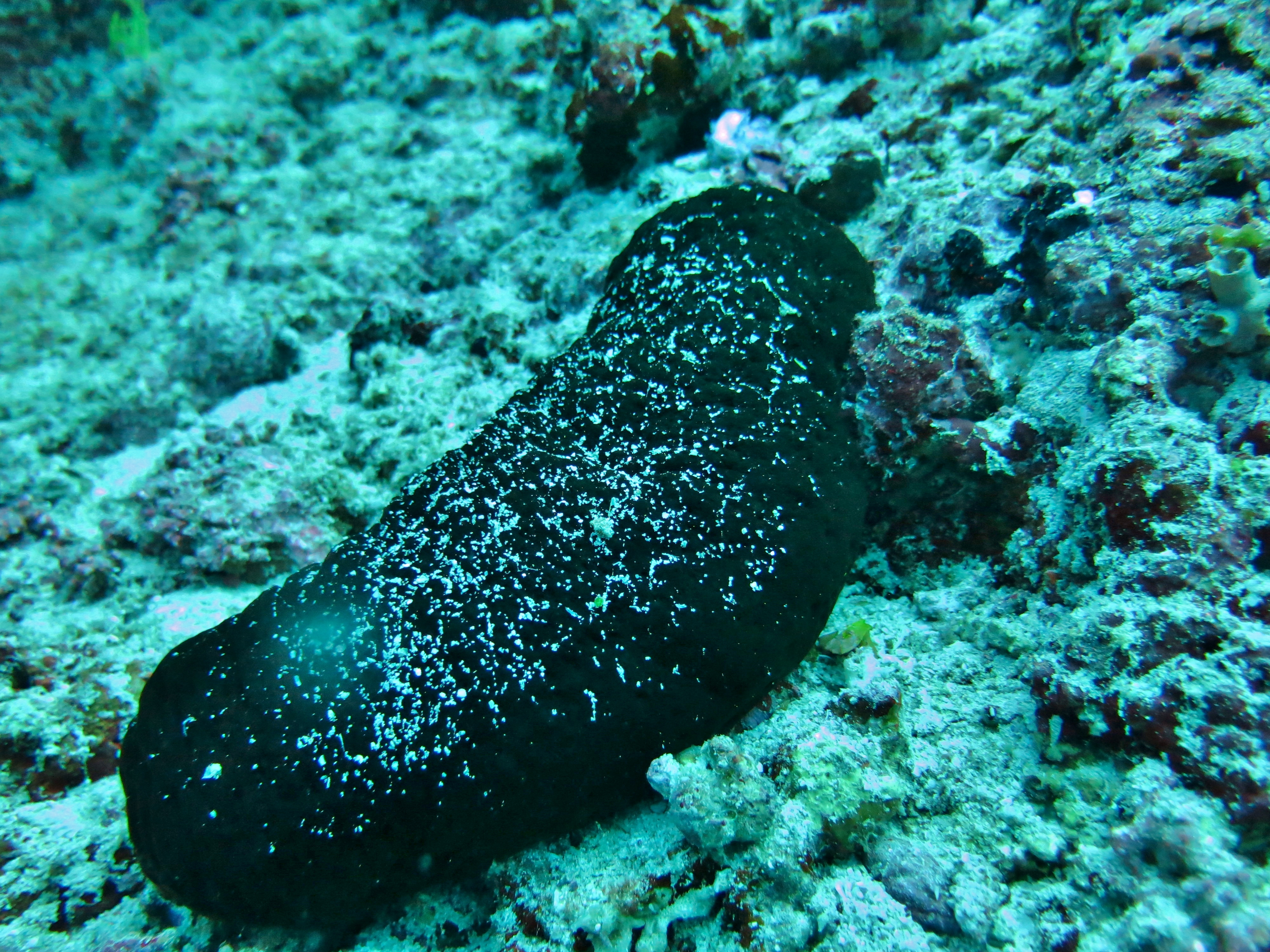

Conservation status
- Vulnerable (IUCN 3.1)

Scientific classification
- Kingdom: Animalia
- Phylum: Echinodermata
- Class: Holothuroidea
- Order: Holothuriida
- Family: Holothuriidae
- Genus: Actinopyga
- Species: A. miliaris

Binomial name
- Actinopyga miliaris (Quoy & Gaimard, 1834)

Synonyms
- Holothuria miliaris Quoy & Gaimard, 1834; Muelleria miliaris Quoy & Gaimard, 1834; Actinopyga polymorpha Saville-Kent, 1890

= Actinopyga miliaris =

Species of sea cucumber

Actinopyga miliaris, commonly known as the hairy blackfish, is a species of sea cucumber in the family Holothuriidae. It is native to the tropical West Indo-Pacific region and is harvested for food.

== Description ==
Actinopyga miliaris grows to a length of about 250 to 350 mm (10 to 14 in), with a maximum width of 10 cm (4 in). The body wall is rough and leathery, with a maximum width of 9 mm (0 in). The bivium is black in coloration, and is covered in mucus and fine sediment. The body is elongated and cylindrical, is slightly arched dorsally and flattened ventrally. The bivium is also covered in long and slender papilles. The trivium, on the other hand, is white in coloration, and covered in many long and thick podia. The anus is surrounded by five strong, triangular anal teeth, and Cuvierian tubules seen in other sea cucumbers are absent.

== Distribution and habitat ==
Actinopyga miliaris is found off the coasts of Asia and Africa, in the tropical Indian Ocean and the western Pacific Ocean. Its range extends from as far east as the Red Sea to as far west as French Polynesia, excluding the Persian Gulf and Hawaii. It can also be found off the coasts of India, northern Australia, eastward to Fiji, Tuvalu, and Tonga, and almost everywhere off the coast of Micronesia. It can be found in depths of 0 to 20 m (0 to 70 ft), and is abundant on seagrass beds and rubble reef flats. It can also be commonly found on sandy beds, lagoon-islet reefs, and fringe reef flats.

== Status ==
This species is harvested commercially for food throughout its range. It is used in the production of bêche-de-mer, which is consumed as a delicacy. In Palau, it is used as a famine food in times of hardship. It is harvested by 17 countries and island states in the Western Central Pacific. Because it is easy to collect by hand, it is over-exploited in many areas, and the International Union for Conservation of Nature estimates that populations have declined by 60 to 90% over about 50% of its range. Due to this, it has assessed the conservation status as vulnerable.
