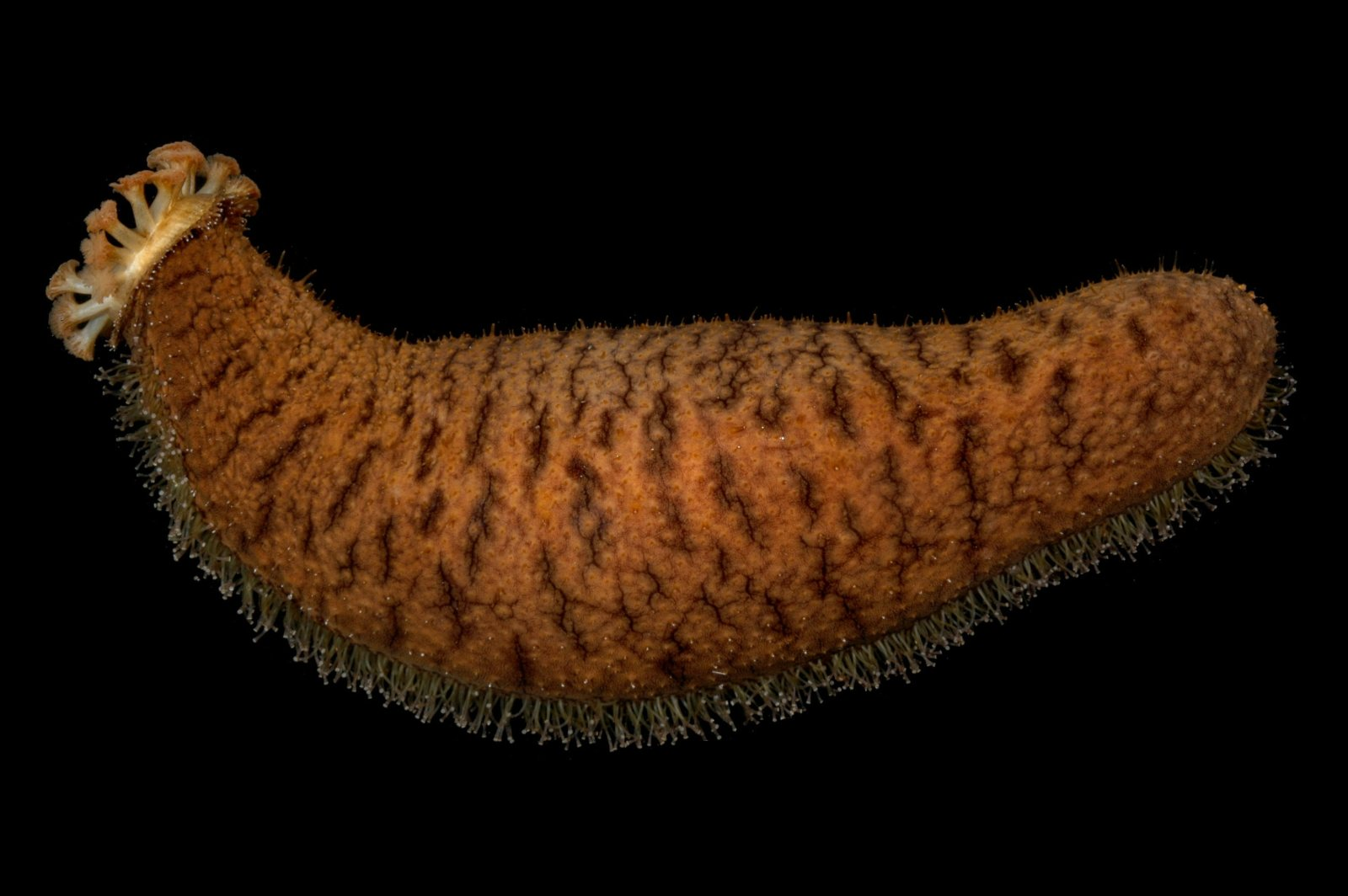

Conservation status
- Vulnerable (IUCN 3.1)

Scientific classification
- Kingdom: Animalia
- Phylum: Echinodermata
- Class: Holothuroidea
- Order: Holothuriida
- Family: Holothuriidae
- Genus: Actinopyga
- Species: A. echinites

Binomial name
- Actinopyga echinites Jaeger, 1833

Synonyms
- Actinopyga caroliniana Tan Tiu, 1981; Actinopyga plebeja (Selenka, 1867); Holothuria (Holothuria) echinites Jaeger, 1833; Muelleria echinites Jaeger, 1833; Muelleria plebeja Selenka, 1867

= Actinopyga echinites =

Species of sea cucumber

Actinopyga echinites, commonly known as the brownfish or deep water redfish, is a species of sea cucumber in the family Holothuriidae. It is native to the tropical Indo-Pacific region and is harvested for food.

== Description ==
Actinopyga echinites grows to a length of about 300 to 350 mm (12 to 14 in). It is widest in the middle, tapering slightly at both ends; the dorsal surface is arched while the ventral surface is flattened. The leathery skin is rough, being covered in papillae. The skin is strengthened by the presence of spicules, microscopic spike-like structures, which in this species are shaped like large rods. The colour of this sea cucumber is brown above and orange-brown below, and the upper surface often has sand adhering to it. The anus is surrounded by five beige anal teeth, and the pinkish Cuvierian tubules are occasionally discharged through the anus when the animal is stressed.

== Distribution and habitat ==
Actinopyga echinites is found off the coasts of Asia and Africa, in the tropical Indian Ocean and the western Pacific Ocean. Its range extends from the Red Sea, the east coast of Africa and Madagascar, to Indonesia, northern Australia, the Philippines, New Guinea and other island groups in the western Pacific. It is found on the seabed in shallow water on reef flats, on fringing flats, in lagoons and estuaries, at depths between 0 and 30 m (0 and 100 ft). It is often plentiful in seagrass meadows and on rubble.

== Status ==
This species is harvested commercially for food over most of its range. It is of medium commercial value and never fetches as good a price as the most desirable species. Because it is easy to collect it is over-exploited in many areas, and the International Union for Conservation of Nature estimates that populations have declined by 60 to 90% over at least 50% of its range. It further estimates that the global population has declined by 40% and it has assessed the conservation status of this sea cucumber as vulnerable.

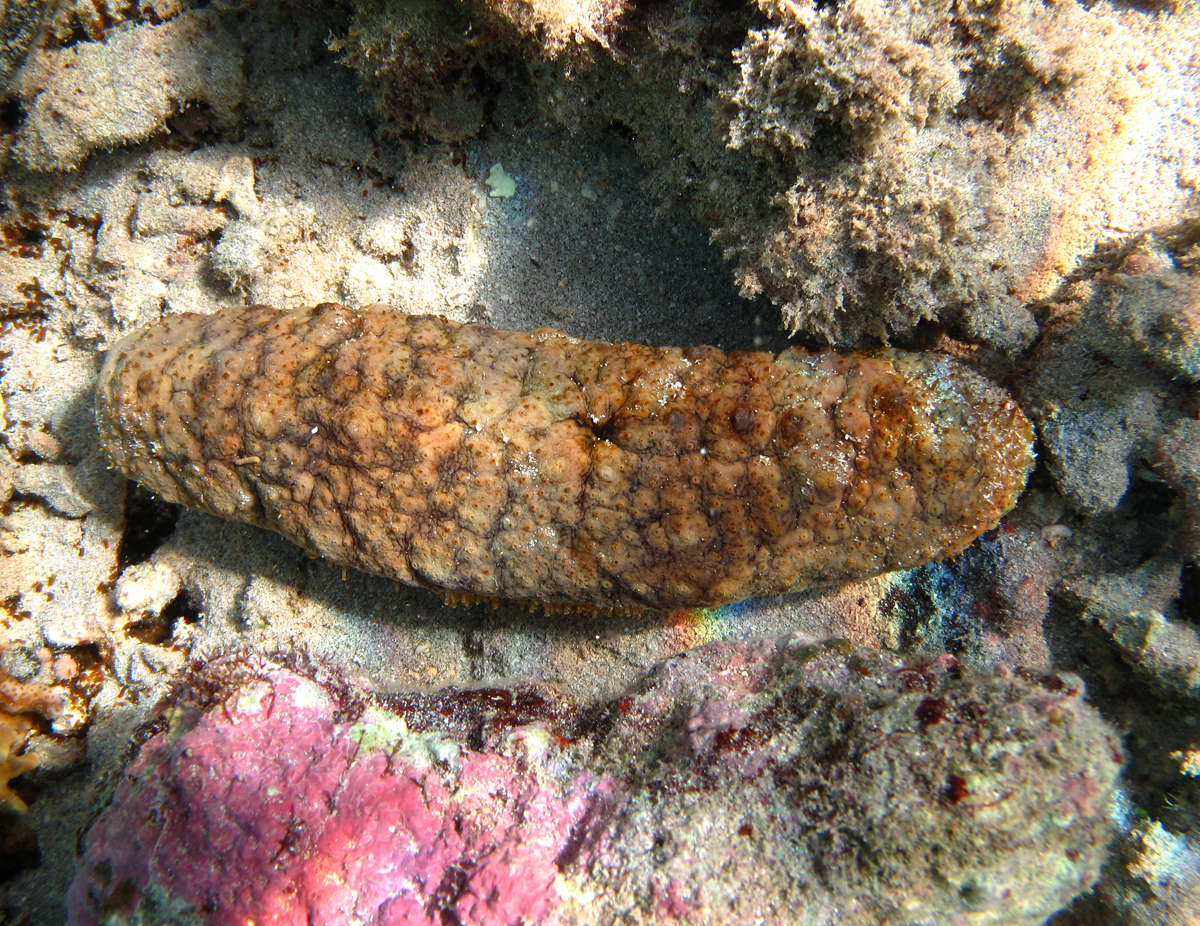

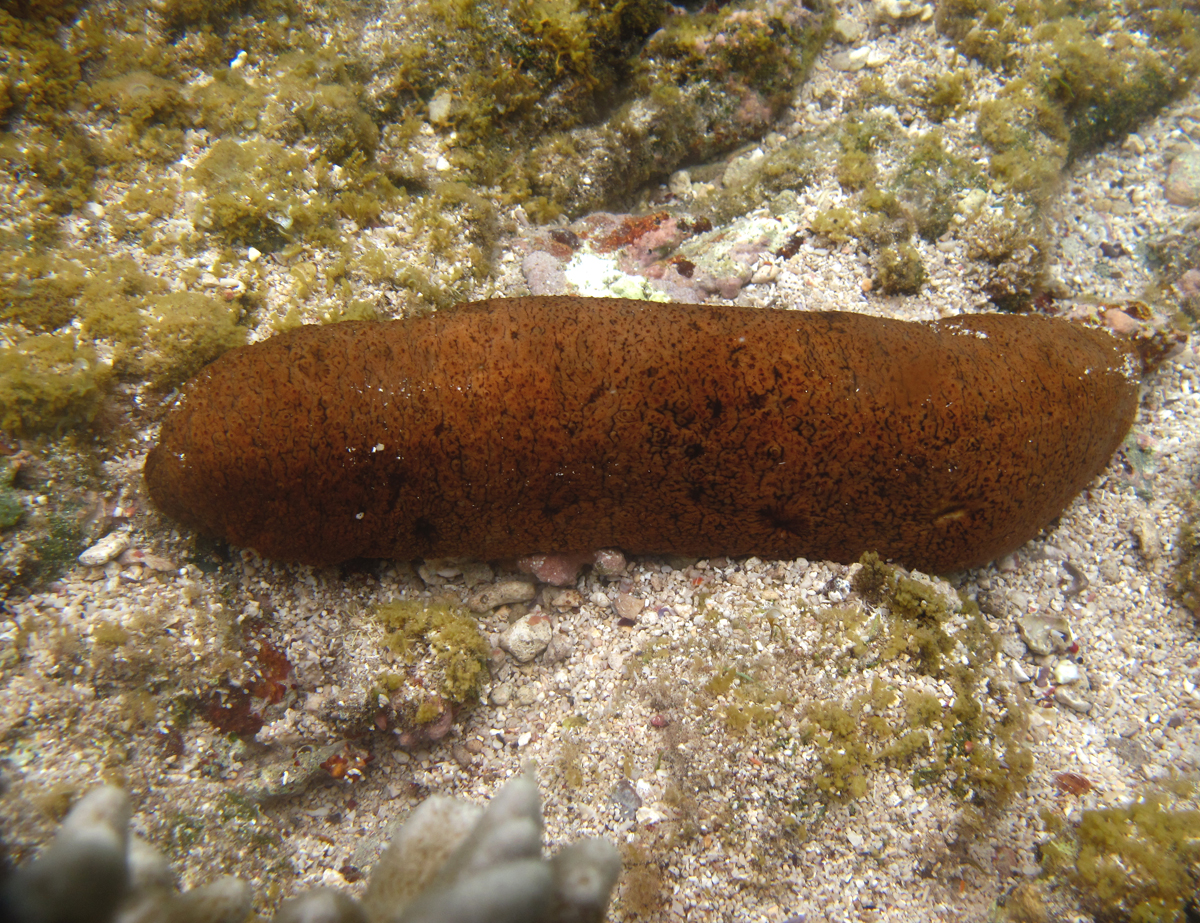

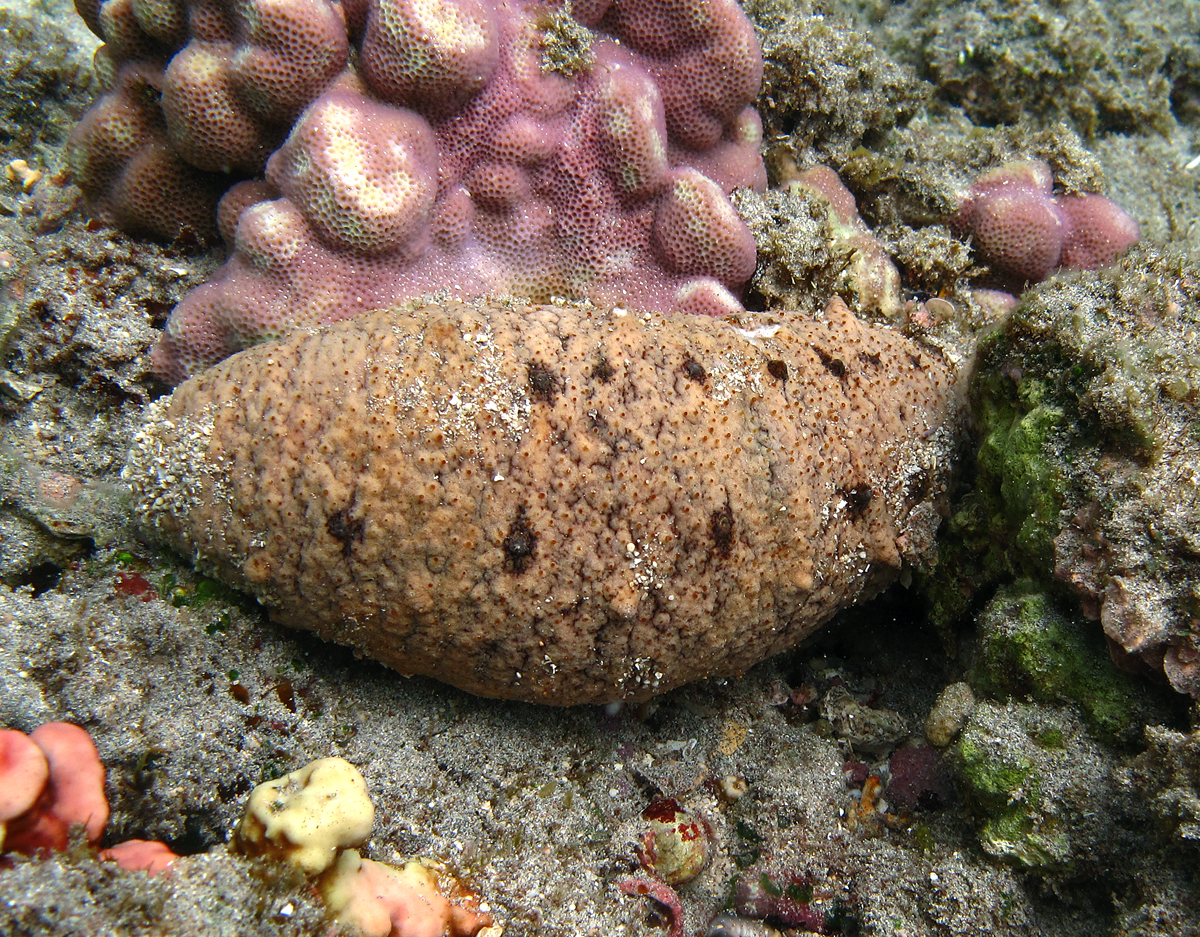
