= Phallodriloides macmasterae =

Conservation status
- Data Deficient (IUCN 3.1)

Scientific classification
- Kingdom: Animalia
- Phylum: Annelida
- Clade: Pleistoannelida
- Clade: Sedentaria
- Class: Clitellata
- Order: Tubificida
- Family: Naididae
- Genus: Phallodriloides
- Species: P. macmasterae

Binomial name
- Phallodriloides macmasterae (Erséus, 1986)

Synonyms
- Phallodrilus macmasterae Erséus, 1986

Species of annelid

Phallodriloides macmasterae is a species of invertebrate in the Naididae family. It is endemic to Bermuda, where it was discovered in 1986. Three specimens were found in Prospero's Cave, a limestone cave near Castle Harbor in Hamilton Parish, Bermuda. The species was added to the IUCN Red List of critically endangered species in 1996, but due to the uncertainty of actual distribution of this species, it is now listed as data deficient.
