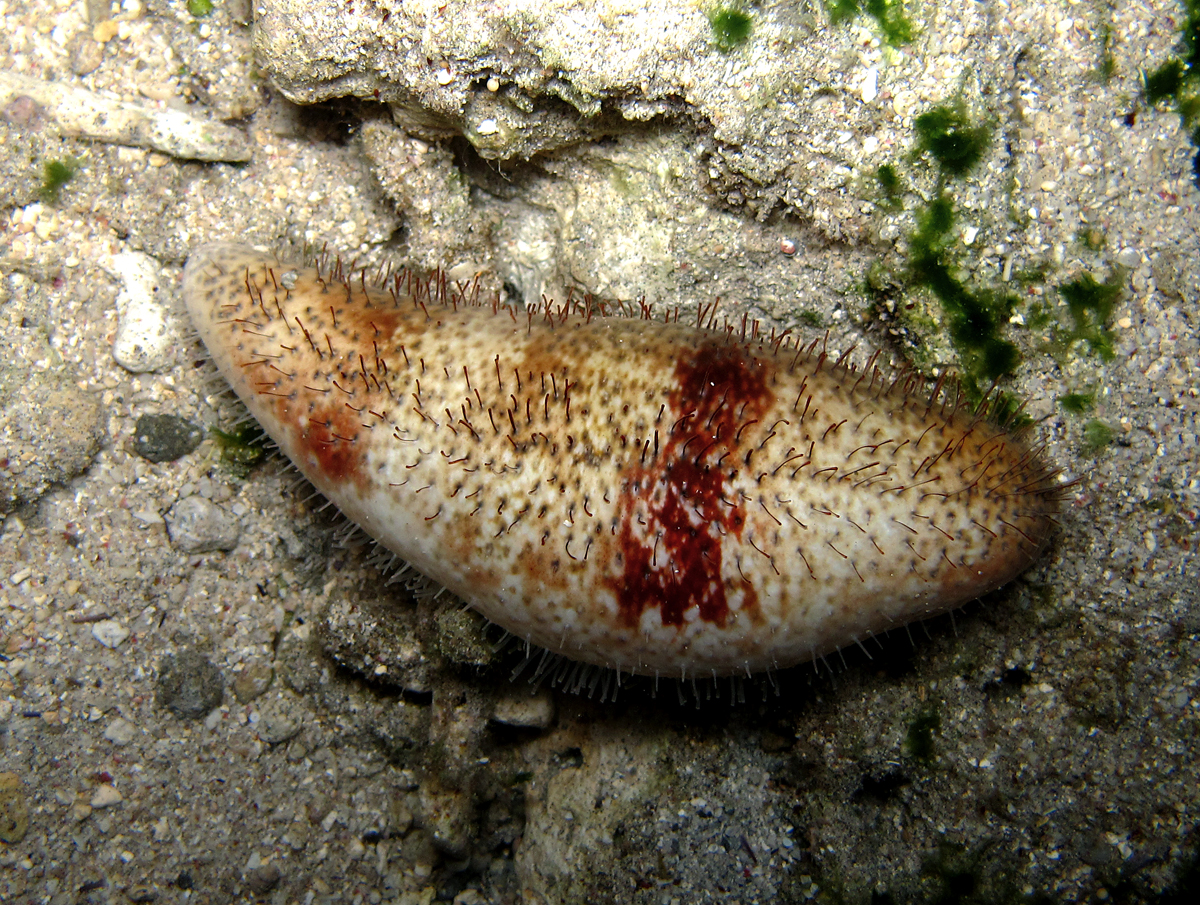

Conservation status
- Data Deficient (IUCN 3.1)

Scientific classification
- Kingdom: Animalia
- Phylum: Echinodermata
- Class: Holothuroidea
- Order: Holothuriida
- Family: Holothuriidae
- Genus: Actinopyga
- Species: A. capillata

Binomial name
- Actinopyga capillata Rowe & Massin, 2006

= Actinopyga capillata =

Species of sea cucumber

Actinopyga capillata, the hairy sea cucumber, is a species of sea cucumber in the family Holothuriidae. It is found in the tropical West Indo-Pacific region, having a disjunct range, with the main population in island groups in the western Indian Ocean, and a separate population in the Philippines.

== Description ==
The genus Actinopyga is characterised by the teeth surrounding the anus and by its distinctive shape. This species grows to a length of 15 cm (6 in), has a characteristic body shape and a distinctive pattern of long tube feet on its dorsal surface, giving it a furry appearance; it is dappled or roughly barred in some shade of brown and white.

== Distribution and habitat ==
Actinopyga capillata was first described in 2006 by Rowe & Massin from Réunion and Rodrigues in the Mascarene Islands in the southwestern Indian Ocean, east of Madagascar. It has since been recorded in Mauritius, and there have been two records from the Philippines, Talikud Island in the south and Siquijor Island in the central Philippines. Additionally, there is photographic evidence of its presence in southwestern Madagascar. It occurs in shallow water and is usually associated with reefs and reef slopes, but can occur on areas of soft sediment. Surveys of sea cucumbers elsewhere in the Indo-Pacific region have not brought up sightings in the area between Mauritius and the Philippines.

== Ecology ==
Actinopyga capillata is a detritivore and feeds at night by ingesting the soft sediment on the seabed or deposited on coral rubble, absorbing the nutritious material and expelling the residue. Like other members of its genus, it probably does not use cuvierian tubules in self-defence, instead the tissues contain saponins, called holothurin, which may cause a fatal hemolysis in fish and other predatory organisms.

The reproduction of this sea cucumber has not been studied, but is likely to be similar to closely related species. Individuals are either male or female, and in the breeding season, group together, raising themselves as high as possible to release their gametes into the sea. Fertilisation takes place in the water column and the developing embryo passes through a free-swimming auricularia and a doliolaria stage before settling on the seabed and undergoing metamorphosis into a juvenile.

== Status ==
Actinopyga capillata is seldom seen, perhaps because of its cryptic nature and nocturnal habits. Although other members of its genus are gathered in the area for human consumption, this species does not seem to among them. There is little information available on its abundance or population trends, so the International Union for Conservation of Nature has assessed its conservation status as "data deficient".
