= Actinopyga agassizii =

Conservation status
- Least Concern (IUCN 3.1)

- Apparently Secure (NatureServe)

Scientific classification
- Kingdom: Animalia
- Phylum: Echinodermata
- Class: Holothuroidea
- Order: Holothuriida
- Family: Holothuriidae
- Genus: Actinopyga
- Species: A. agassizii

Binomial name
- Actinopyga agassizii (Selenka, 1867)

Synonyms
- Actinopyga agassizi (Selenka, 1867) (misspelling); Mülleria agassizii Selenka, 1867

Species of sea cucumber

Actinopyga agassizii, commonly known as the five-toothed sea cucumber or West Indian sea cucumber, is a species of sea cucumber in the family Holothuriidae. It was first described by German zoologist Emil Selenka in 1867. It is native to the Western Atlantic region, including the Gulf of Mexico and the Caribbean Sea, and is harvested for food.

== Description ==
Actinopyga agassizii grows to a maximum length of approximately 35 cm (14 in). It has a white ground color with scattered yellow-brown spots. Its skin is thick and leathery, and its upper side is lined with papillae (conical fleshy protuberances) while rows of tube feet are found on its bottom side. It has five calcareous teeth surrounding its anus, a characteristic from which one of its common names is derived.

== Distribution and habitat ==
Actinopyga agassizii is found in the tropical Western Atlantic region, its range extending from the Gulf of Mexico to the Caribbean Sea. It is also found off the coasts of Bermuda. It is nocturnal and inhabits rocky areas, coral reefs, and sea grass beds at depths between 0 and 54 m (177 ft).

== Biology ==
Actinopyga agassizii feeds on detritus on algal turfs and sea grass beds and in sandy or rocky areas. An individual possesses only one of the two sexes and has a single gonad. It spawns and fertilizes both externally and may show signs of brooding. Its life cycle consists of the embryo growing into a free-swimming larva before developing a barrel-shaped body and later undergoing metamorphosis to turn into a juvenile sea cucumber. As a mode of self-defence, it can expel clusters of sticky threads called Cuvierian tubules which contain a toxic saponin named holothurin that can paralyze other animals.

== Conservation status ==
Actinopyga agassizii is caught for food in small-scale artisanal fisheries. However, the quantities and the locations in which it is fished are currently unknown. It is less popular among fisheries compared with other sea cucumber species, although its popularity may rise when other species with higher demands are exhausted in numbers. As of its last assessment in 2010, the IUCN Red List considers Actinopyga agassizii to be a least-concern species.
