= Actinopyga fusca =

Conservation status
- Data Deficient (IUCN 3.1)

Scientific classification
- Kingdom: Animalia
- Phylum: Echinodermata
- Class: Holothuroidea
- Order: Holothuriida
- Family: Holothuriidae
- Genus: Actinopyga
- Species: A. fusca

Binomial name
- Actinopyga fusca Cherbonnier, 1980

Species of sea cucumber

Actinopyga fusca is a species of sea cucumber in the family Holothuriidae. It is endemic to the shallow coastal waters of New Caledonia, particularly around the island of Ilot Maître.

== Taxonomy ==
The type locality of this species is Ilot Maître, New Caledonia. The holotype specimen (MNHN IE 2013-17828) is deposited in the echinoderm collection of the National Museum of Natural History, France.

== Conservation status ==
As of its latest assessment in 2010, the IUCN Red List considers Actinopyga fusca to be a data deficient species. Accurate assessment of its conservation status is presently impossible due to the lack of population data, information regarding its distribution, habitat, ecology, and impact of major threats (if any exist), and a dearth of relevant occurrence records. It may be harvested as part of the Indo-Pacific sea cucumber fishery, but there is no evidence at this time suggesting it is commercially important. Nevertheless, what little is known about this species suggests that its distribution overlaps with several marine protected areas (MPAs) along the coast of New Caledonia, including one at its type locality of Ilot Maître.
