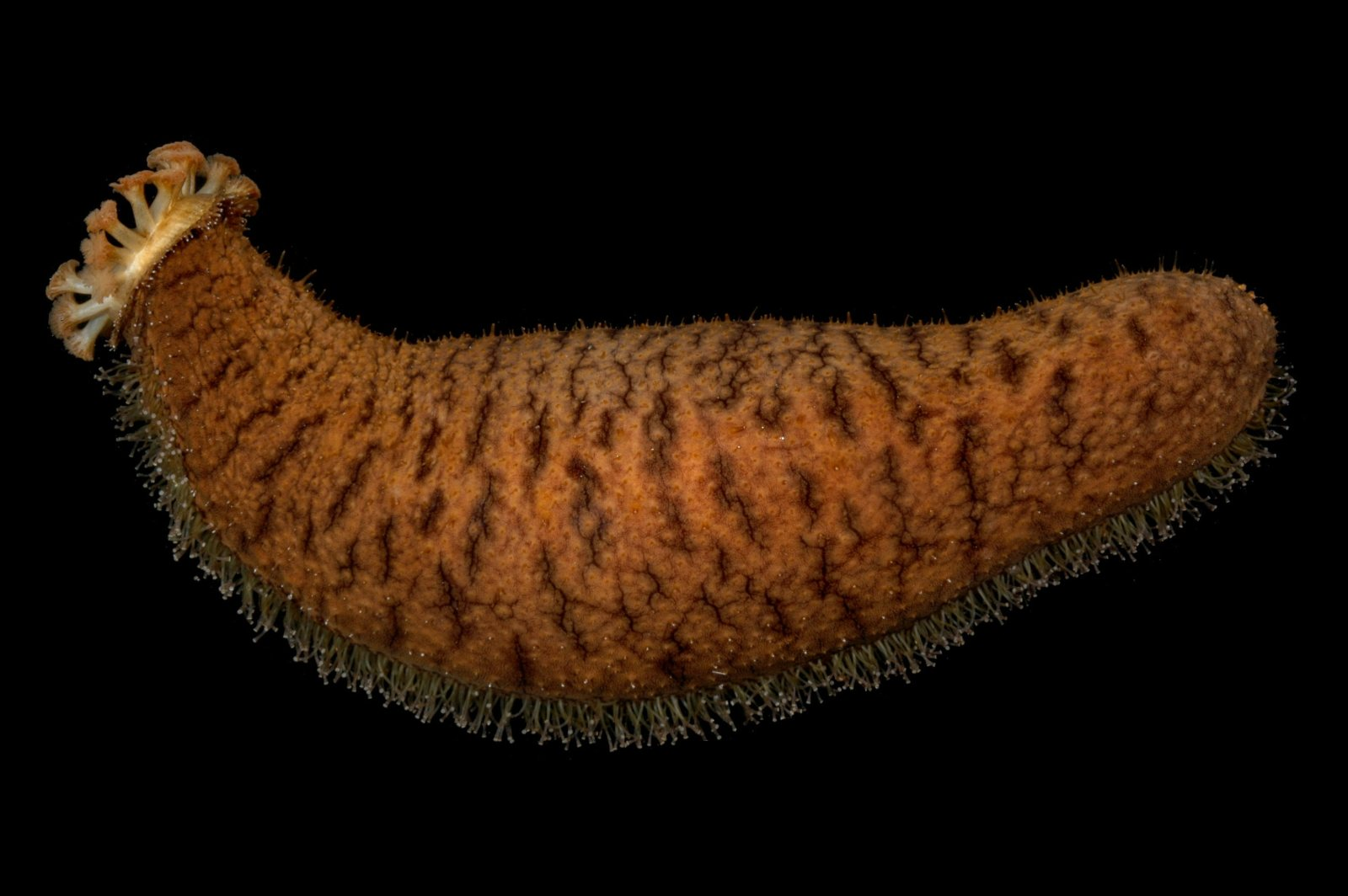
- Actinopyga echinites

Scientific classification
- Kingdom: Animalia
- Phylum: Echinodermata
- Class: Holothuroidea
- Order: Holothuriida
- Family: Holothuriidae
- Genus: Actinopyga; Bronn, 1860

Synonyms
- Jaegeria Bell, 1887; Metis Gistel, 1848; Muelleria Jaeger, 1833

= Actinopyga =

Genus of sea cucumbers

Actinopyga is a genus of sea cucumbers found in coastal waters in tropical and temperate regions.

== Species ==
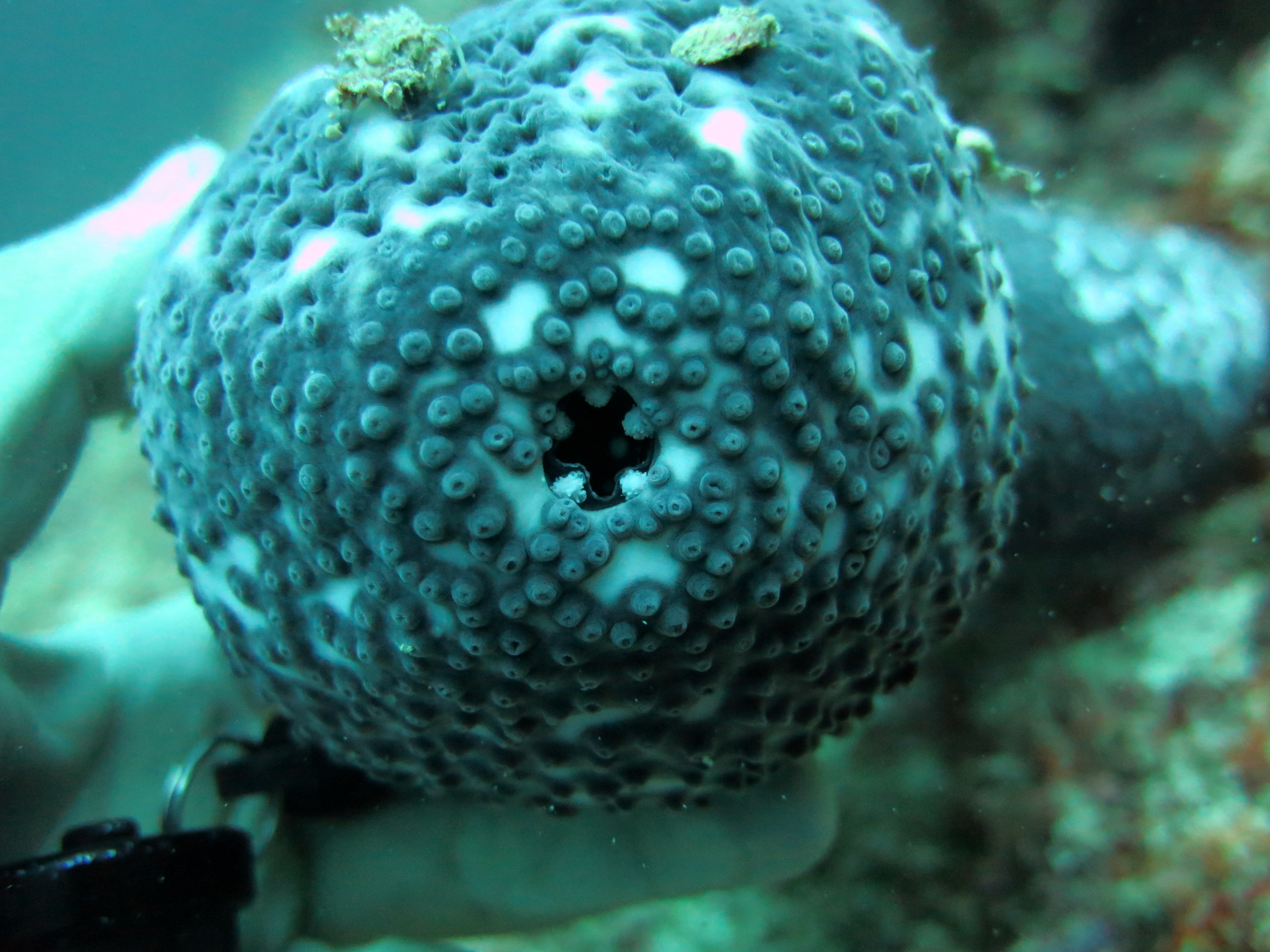
This genus is distinctive thanks to its anal teeth (here Actinopyga caerulea). However, some Holothuria can have similar appendages.

As of 2024, the World Register of Marine Species recognizes 18 species:

- Actinopyga agassizii (Selenka, 1867)
- Actinopyga albonigra Cherbonnier & Féral, 1984
- Actinopyga bacilla Cherbonnier, 1988
- Actinopyga bannwarthi (Panning, 1944)
- Actinopyga caerulea Samyn, VandenSpiegel & Massin, 2006
- Actinopyga capillata Rowe & Massin, 2006
- Actinopyga crassa Panning, 1944
- Actinopyga echinites (Jaeger, 1833)
- Actinopyga flammea Cherbonnier, 1979
- Actinopyga fusca Cherbonnier, 1980
- Actinopyga lecanora (Jaeger, 1833)
- Actinopyga mauritiana (Quoy & Gaimard, 1833)
- Actinopyga miliaris (Quoy & Gaimard, 1833)
- Actinopyga obesa (Selenka, 1867)
- Actinopyga palauensis Panning, 1944
- Actinopyga serratidens Pearson, 1903
- Actinopyga spinea Cherbonnier, 1980
- Actinopyga varians (Selenka, 1867)

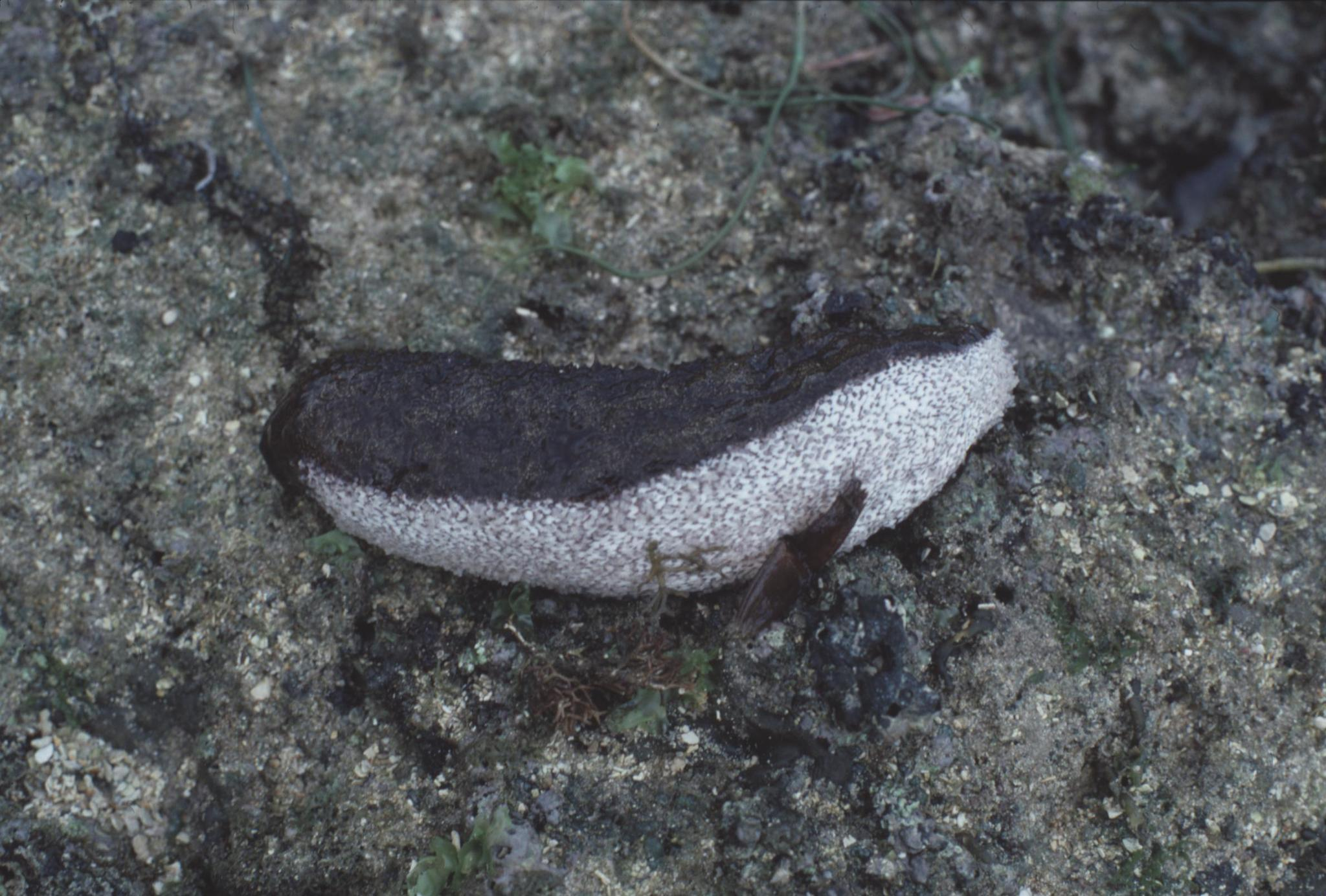
Actinopyga bannwarthi.

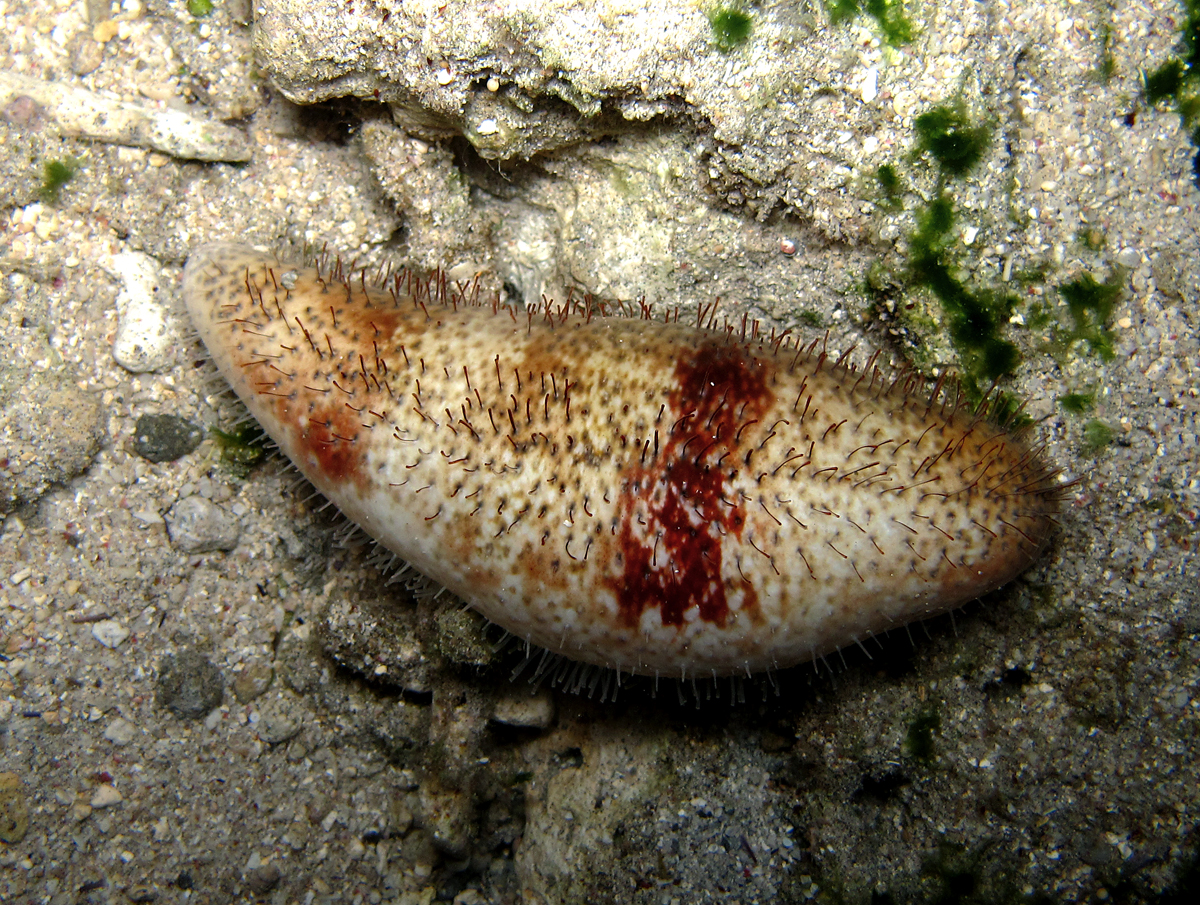
Actinopyga capillata.

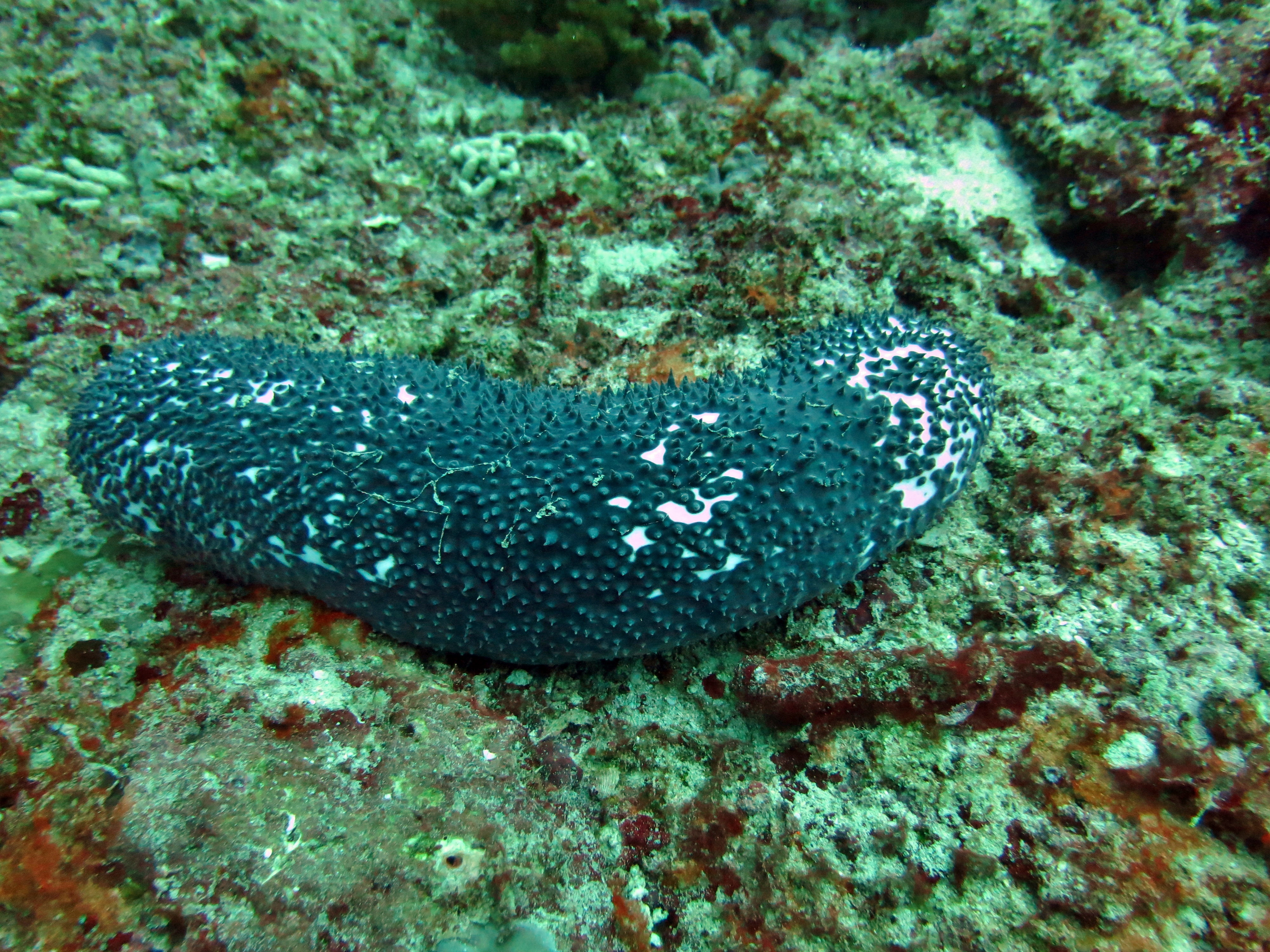
Actinopyga caerulea.

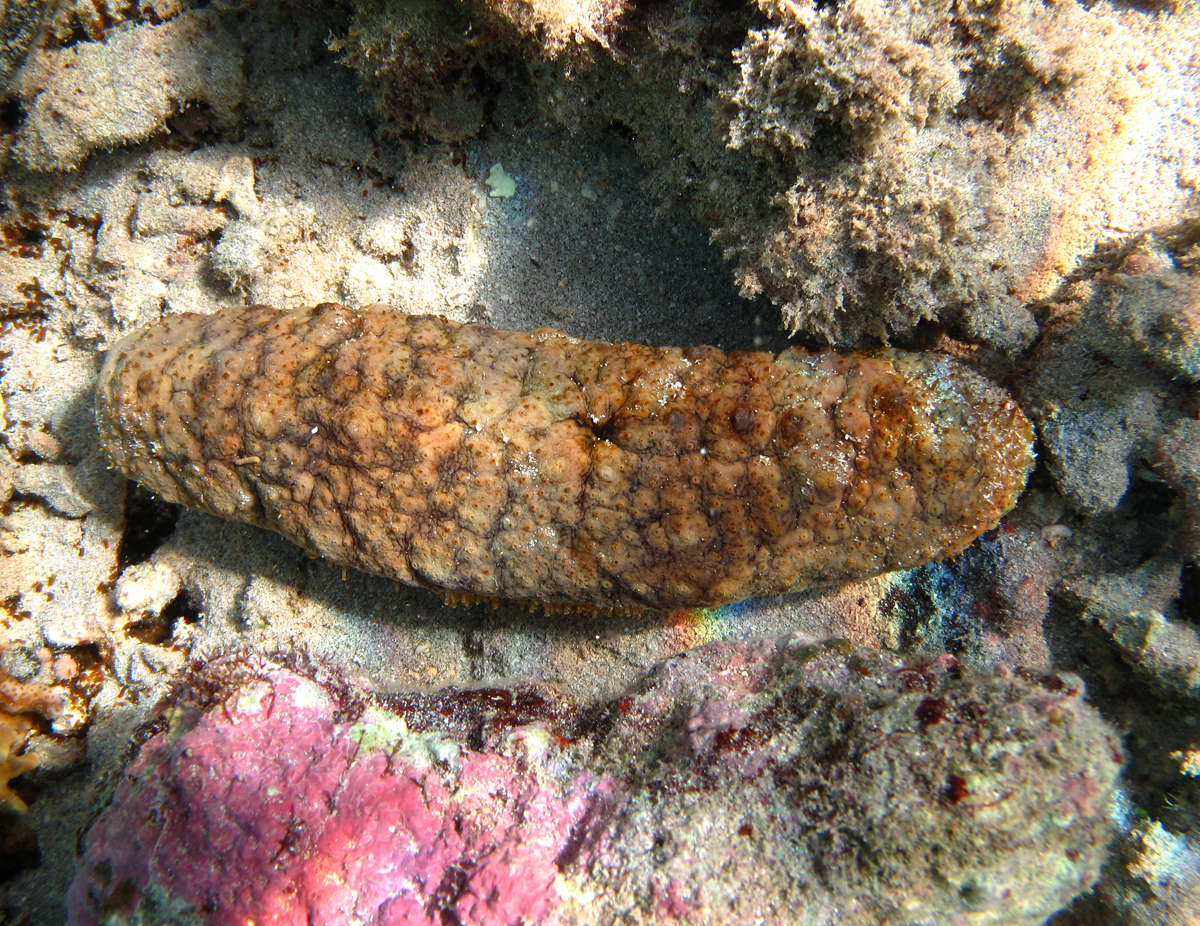
Actinopyga echinites.

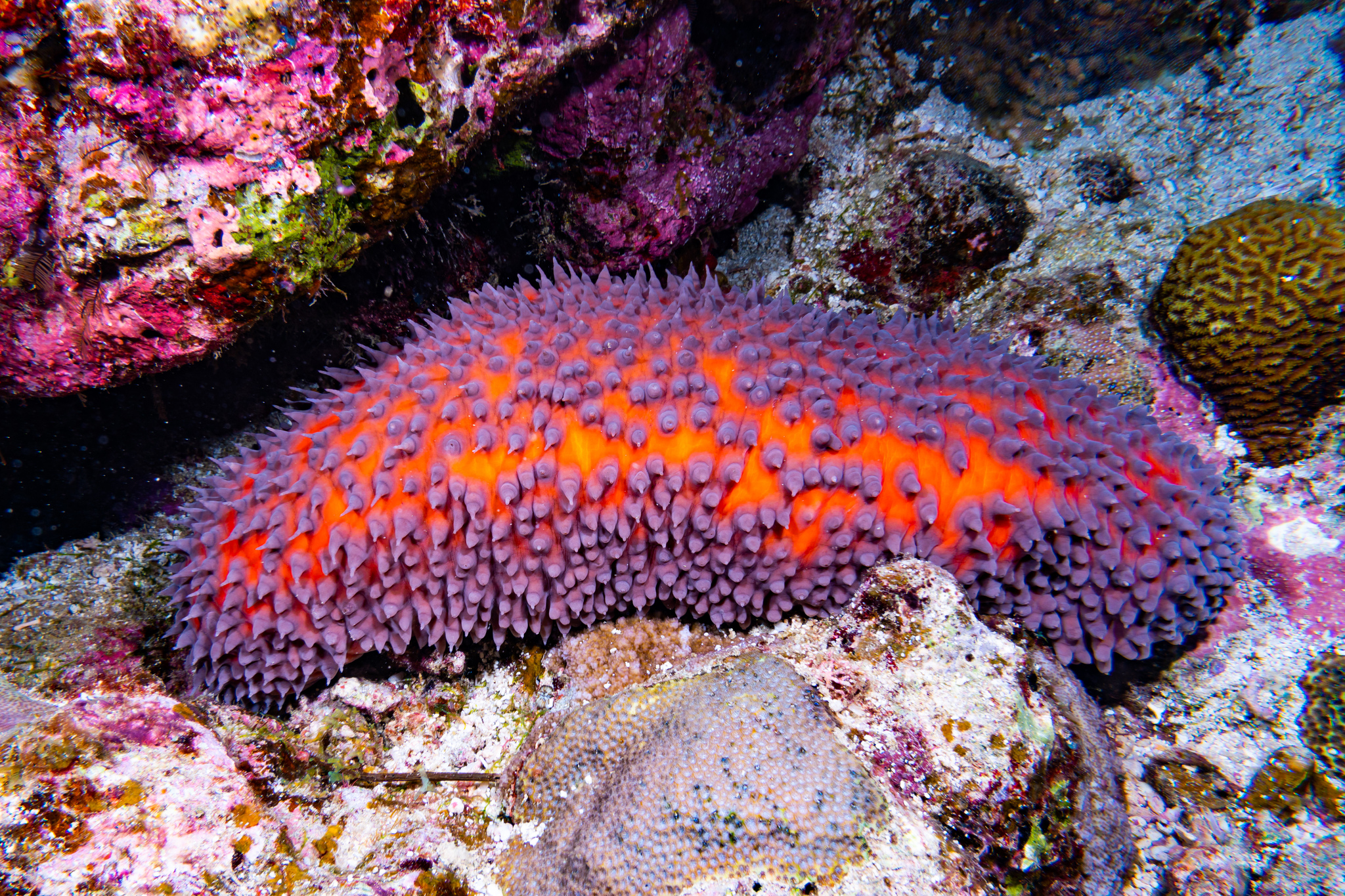
Actinopyga flammea.

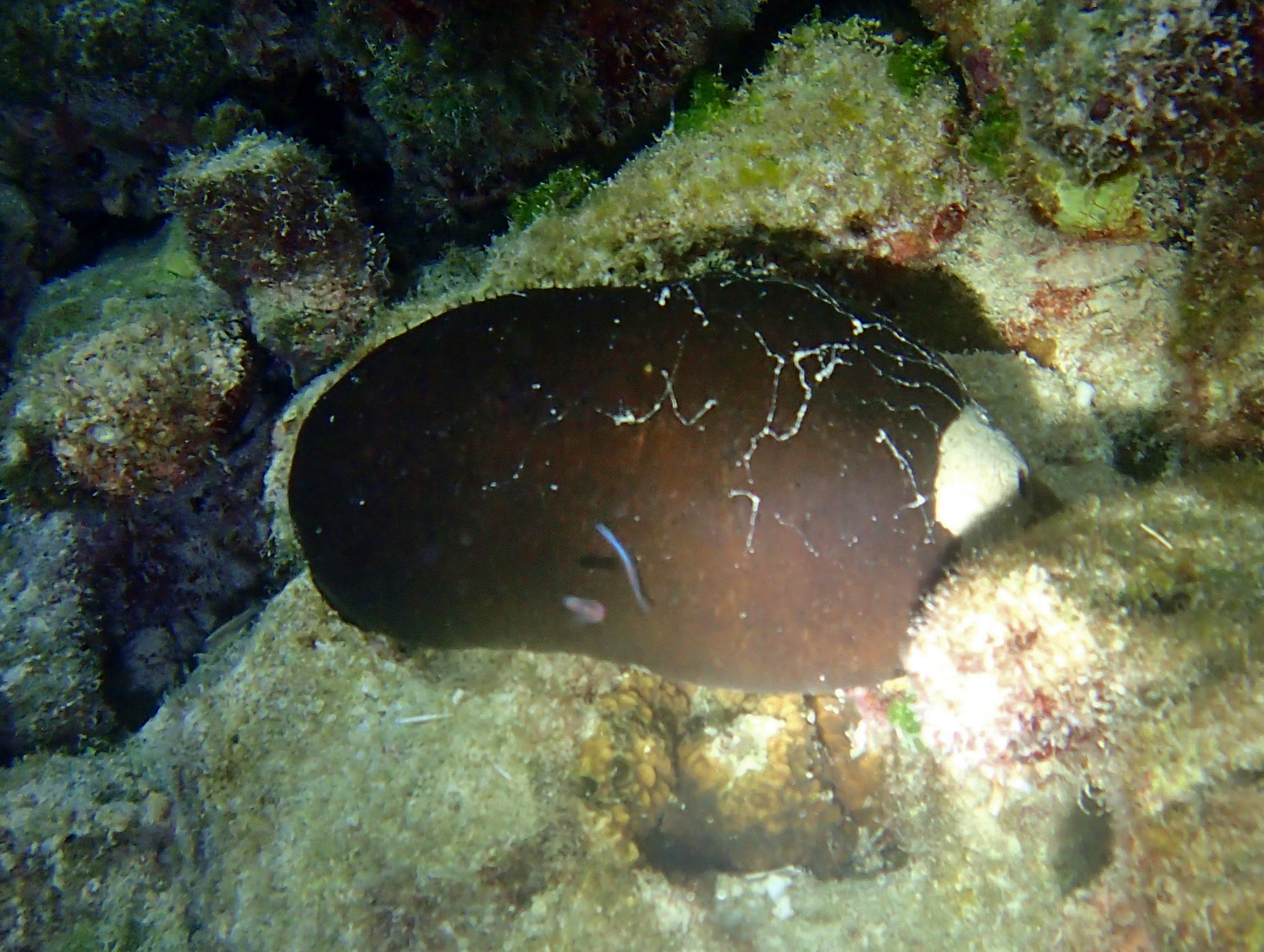
Actinopyga lecanora.

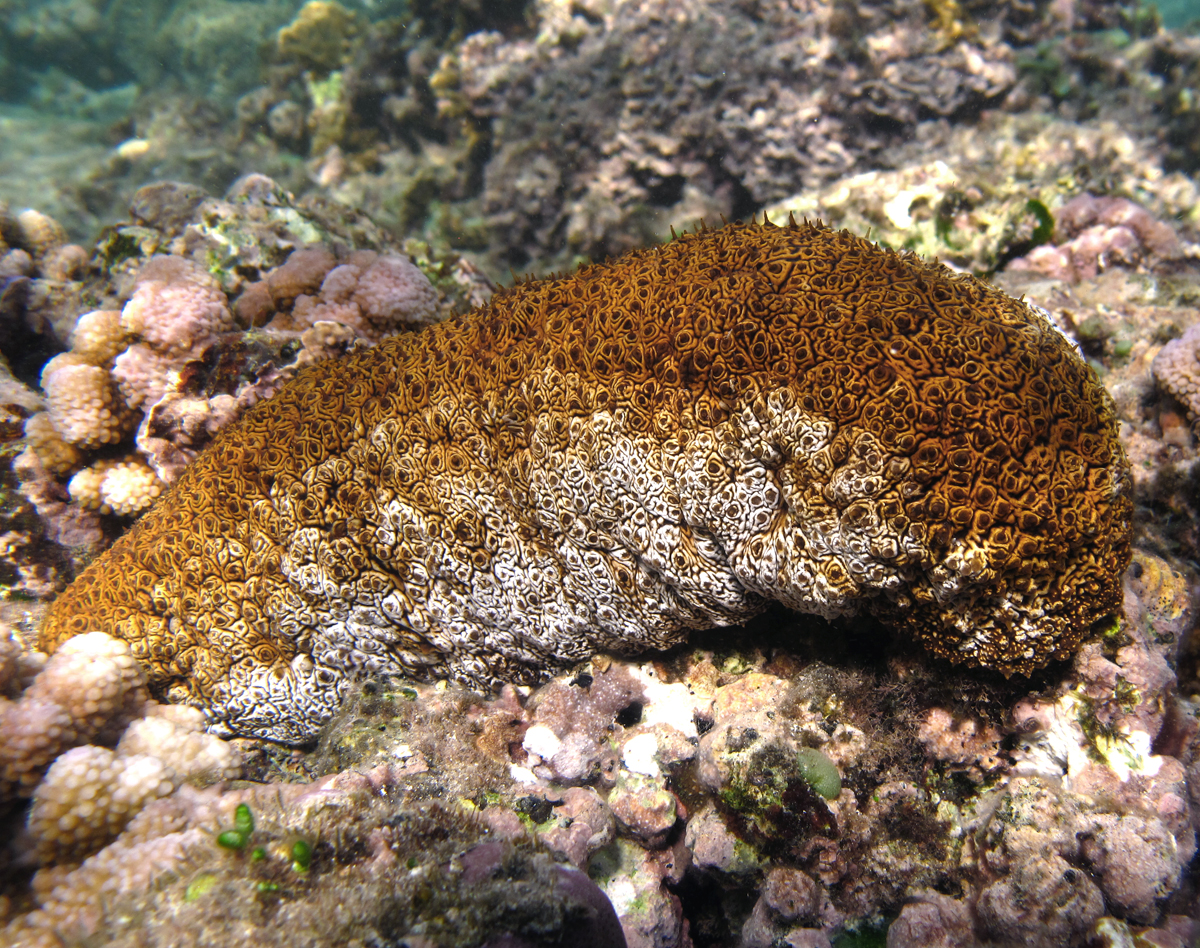
Actinopyga mauritiana.

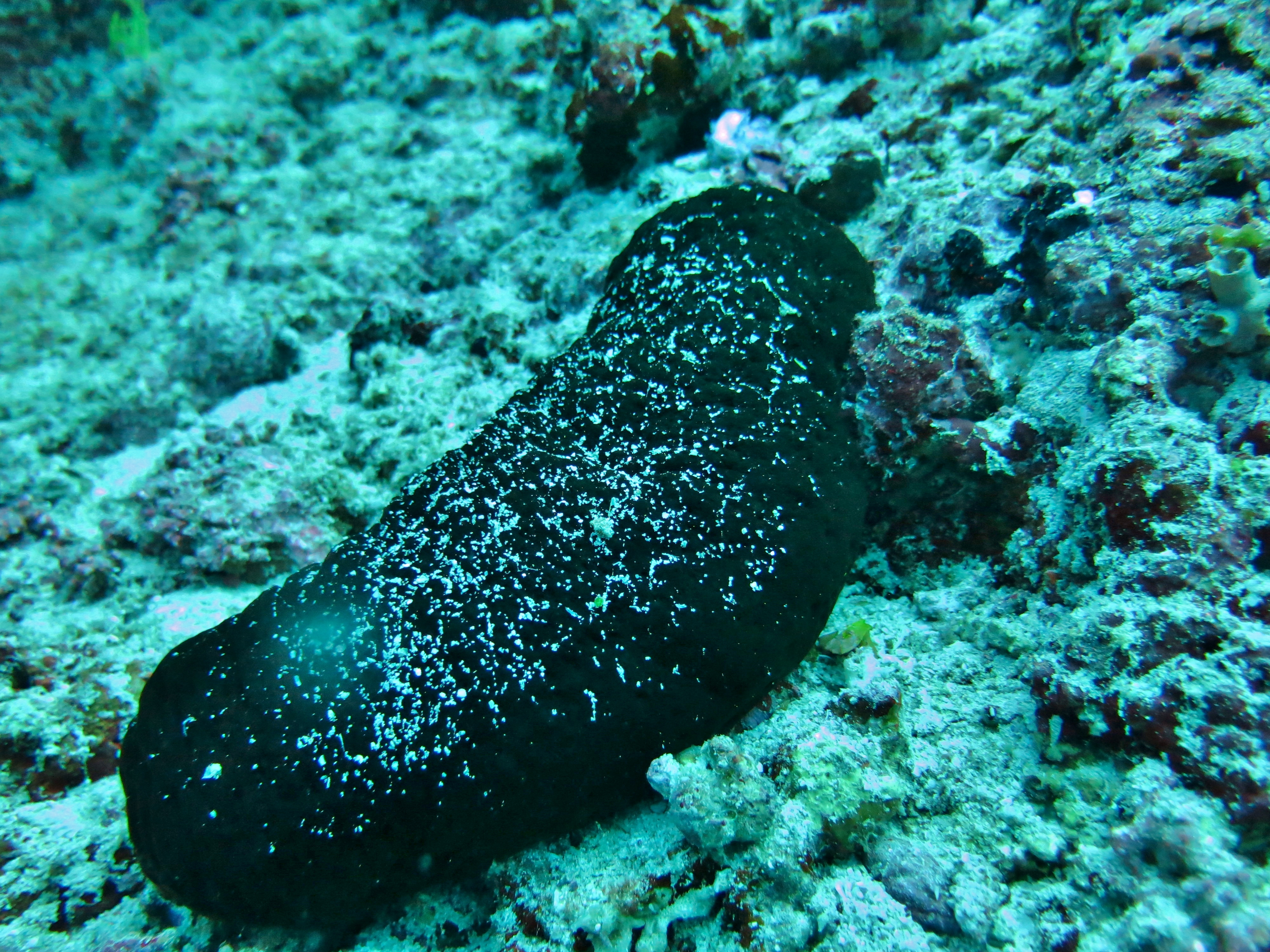
Actinopyga miliaris

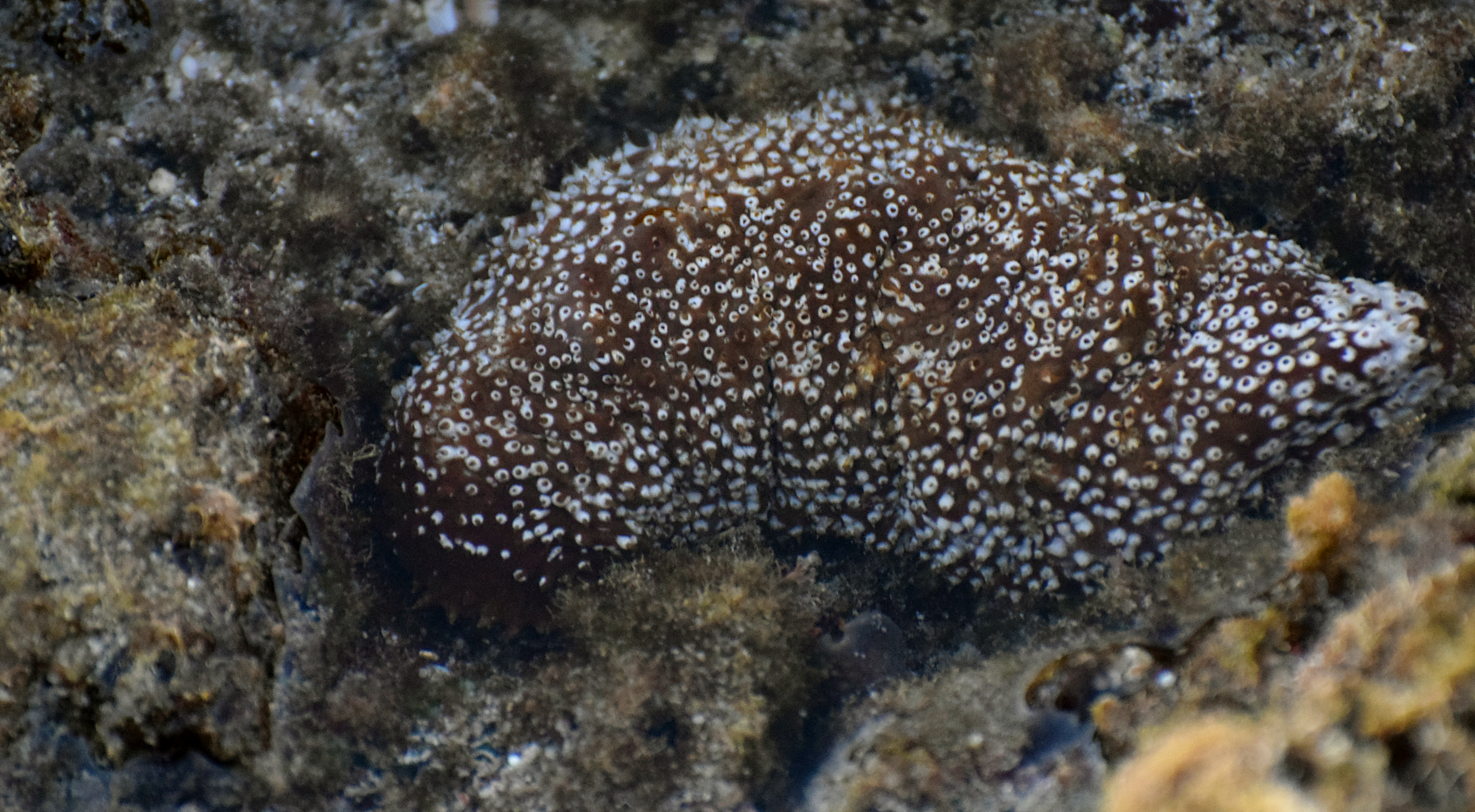
Actinopyga varians
