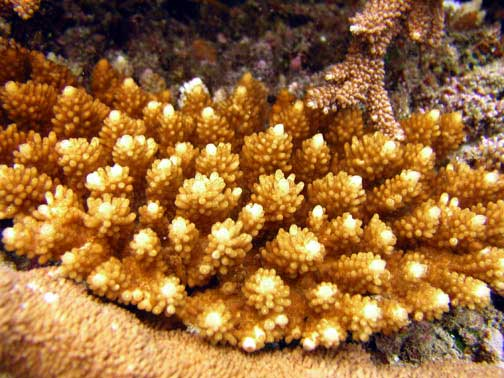

Conservation status
- Data Deficient (IUCN 3.1)

Scientific classification
- Kingdom: Animalia
- Phylum: Cnidaria
- Subphylum: Anthozoa
- Class: Hexacorallia
- Order: Scleractinia
- Family: Acroporidae
- Genus: Acropora
- Species: A. cophodactyla

Binomial name
- Acropora cophodactyla (Brook, 1892)

Synonyms
- Madrepora cophodactyla Brook, 1892

= Acropora cophodactyla =

Species of coral

Acropora cophodactyla is a species of uncertain validity (taxon inquirendum) of acroporid coral found in the central Indo-Pacific, Australia, southeast Asia, the Solomon Islands and the western Pacific Ocean. It is also found in Fiji, Andaman Islands and American Samoa. It may be synonymous with A. humilis. It is found in shallow tropical coral reefs on exposed upper slopes and flats, at depths of 0 to 12 m. It was described by Brook in 1892.

== Description ==
Acropora cophodactyla occurs in encrusted-based colonies composed of digitated bushes. Its colonies contain thick branches that taper to a point, at which a single obvious axial corallite is located. Incipient axial and radial corallites are of varying diameters and occur in no specific pattern. The species is mainly purple or blue in colour. It looks similar to Acropora anthocercis, Acropora appressa, and Acropora humilis.

== Distribution ==
It is listed as a data deficient species on the IUCN Red List, but it is believed that its population is decreasing due to the global decline of coral reefs, and it is listed under Appendix II of CITES. Figures of its population are unknown, but is probably threatened by the global reduction of coral reefs, the increase of temperature causing coral bleaching, climate change, human activity, the crown-of-thorns starfish (Acanthaster planci) and disease. It occurs at between 0 and 12 metres (0 and 39 ft) below the surface. The species occurs in the central Indo-Pacific, southeast Asia, Australia, the Solomon Islands, and the western Pacific. It is abundant in Guam.

== Taxonomy ==
This species was first described as Madrepora cophodactyla by Brook in 1892. Its current taxonomic status is uncertain as it is classified as a taxon inquirendum.
