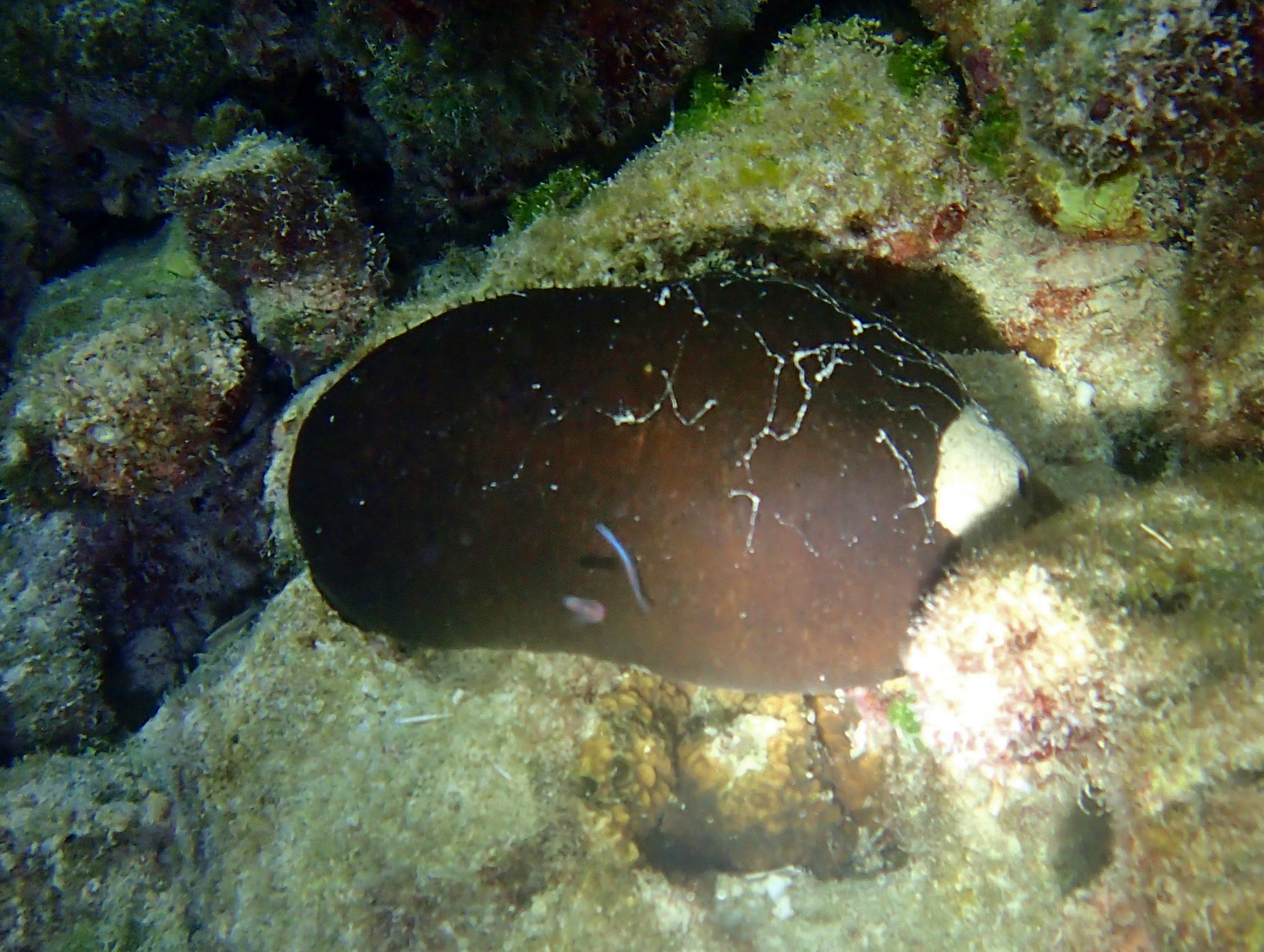

Conservation status
- Data Deficient (IUCN 3.1)

Scientific classification
- Kingdom: Animalia
- Phylum: Echinodermata
- Class: Holothuroidea
- Order: Holothuriida
- Family: Holothuriidae
- Genus: Actinopyga
- Species: A. lecanora

Binomial name
- Actinopyga lecanora Jaeger, 1833

Synonyms
- Muelleria lecanora (Jaeger, 1833); Holothuria lecanora Jaeger, 1833; Holothuria lineolata Quoy & Gaimard, 1834; Holothuria dubia Brandt, 1835

= Actinopyga lecanora =

Species of sea cucumber

Actinopyga lecanora, commonly known as the white-bottomed sea cucumber or stonefish, is a species of sea cucumber in the family Holothuriidae. It is native to the tropical Western Indo-Pacific region and is harvested for food.

== Description ==
Actinopyga lecanora grows to a length of about 250 mm (10 in). The top and bottom of the sea cucumber is a mottled tan-orange colour, and the anus is surrounded with a white ring, lending the sea cucumber its common name.

== Distribution and habitat ==
Actinopyga lecanora is found off the coasts of Asia and East Africa, in the tropical Indian Ocean and the western Pacific Ocean. Its range extends from Kenya and Madagascar to the west, to Papua New Guinea, the Philippines, Taiwan, and other island groups in the western Pacific. It is considered rare in the Taiping Islands and Taiwan. It is nocturnal and typically found on forereef slopes, at depths between 0 and 23 m (0 and 80 ft), and prefers microhabitat with complex topography.

== Status ==
This species is harvested commercially for food and traditional medicine in some parts of its range, and is of medium commercial importance. It is used in the production of bêche-de-mer in 13 different countries in the Western Central Pacific. In Papua New Guinea, it is subject to a minimum size limit of 15 cm (6 in) if fresh and 15 cm (6 in) if dry, as well as a designated fishing season between January 16 and September 30 to prevent overfishing. The IUCN lists its conservation status as data deficient.

== Aquaculture and early development ==
This species has not been cultured at industrial scales, but a technique to produce its juvenile has been developed. This species has large ovary over 300 μm in diameter and lecithotrophic. Its planktonic larva rapidly settles into the benthic phase in 4-8 days after fertilization.
