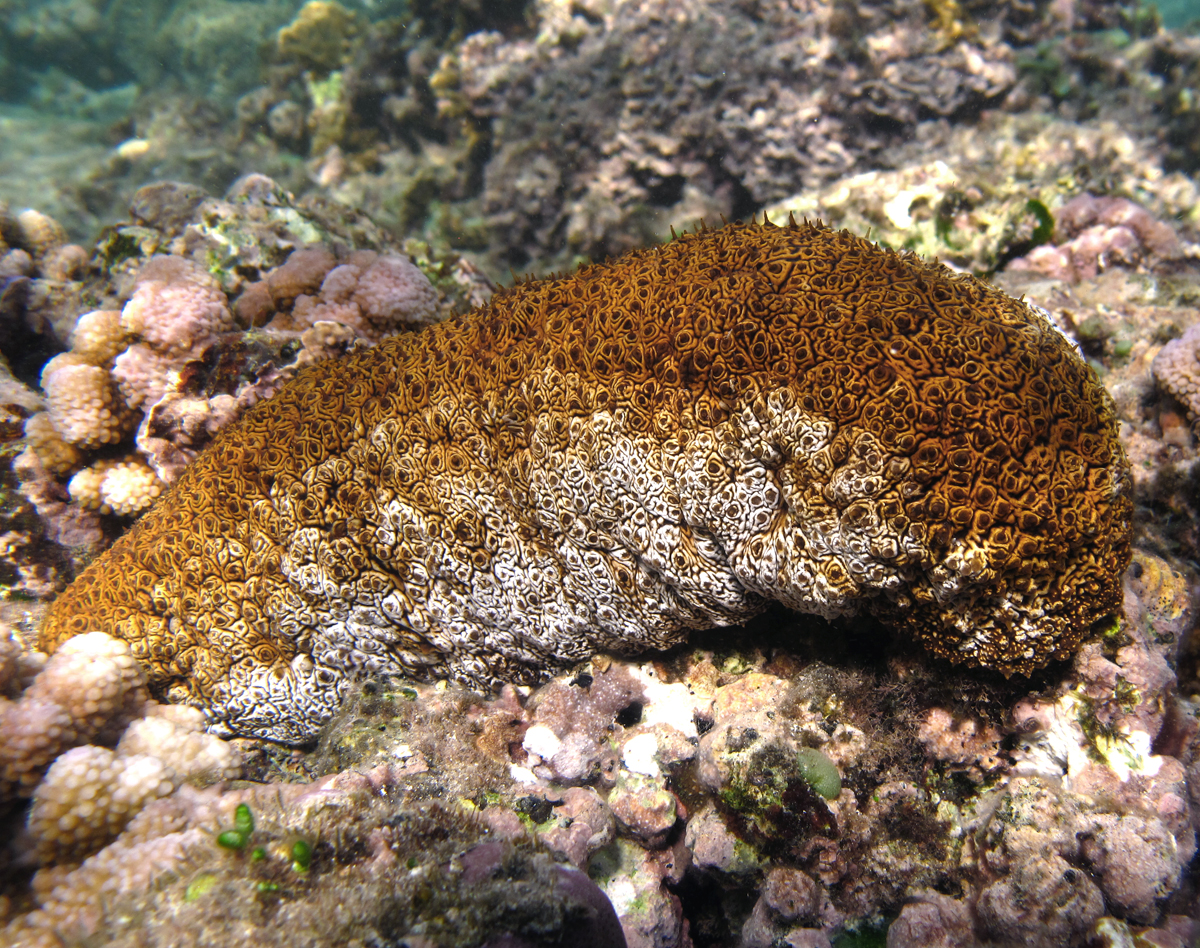

Conservation status
- Vulnerable (IUCN 3.1)

Scientific classification
- Kingdom: Animalia
- Phylum: Echinodermata
- Class: Holothuroidea
- Order: Holothuriida
- Family: Holothuriidae
- Genus: Actinopyga
- Species: A. mauritiana

Binomial name
- Actinopyga mauritiana (Quoy & Gaimard, 1834)

Synonyms
- Holothuria mauritiana Quoy & Gaimard, 1834; Muelleria mauritiana Quoy & Gaimard, 1834

= Actinopyga mauritiana =

Species of sea cucumber

Actinopyga mauritiana, commonly known as the surf redfish, is a species of sea cucumber in the family Holothuriidae. It is native to the tropical West Indo-Pacific region and is harvested for food.

== Description ==
Actinopyga mauritiana grows to a length of about 220 to 350 mm (9 to 14 in), with a maximum width of 10 cm (4 in). The body wall is rough, leathery, and has a maximum thickness of 6 mm (0 in). The bivium is dark brown or orange in coloration, with occasional white spots, and is sometimes wrinkled. It is wider in the middle, and tapers out on either end. The bivium is also covered in long and slender papilles, which are typically dark orange or brown in coloration. The trivium is white in coloration, and covered in many stout podia. The anus is surrounded by twenty-five anal teeth, and the pinkish Cuvierian tubules, unlike other sea cucumbers, are never expelled.

== Distribution and habitat ==
Actinopyga mauritiana is found off the coasts of Asia and Africa, in the tropical Indian Ocean and the western Pacific Ocean. Its range extends from as far east as the Red Sea to as far west as Hawaii. It is particularly common off the coast of Madagascar, where it can be found on the west coast from the south of Toliara to Nosy Be. It is found near outer reef flats and fringe reefs, and is more active during the day, when it feeds on substrate. It can be found in depths of 0 to 50 m (0 to 160 ft).

== Use as food ==
This species is harvested commercially for food throughout its range. It is used in the production of bêche-de-mer, which is consumed as a delicacy, and is of greater importance in times of hardship. It is harvested by 22 countries and island states in the Western Central Pacific, and is one of the top three species for local subsistence.

== Status ==
Because it is easy to collect, it is over-exploited in many areas, and the International Union for Conservation of Nature estimates that populations have declined by 60 to 90% over at least 60% of its range. It further estimates that is overexploited in 25% of its range, and it has assessed the conservation status as vulnerable due to this.
