= Anhatomirim Environmental Protection Area =

- Área de Proteção Ambiental de Anhatomirim
- IUCN category V (protected landscape/seascape)
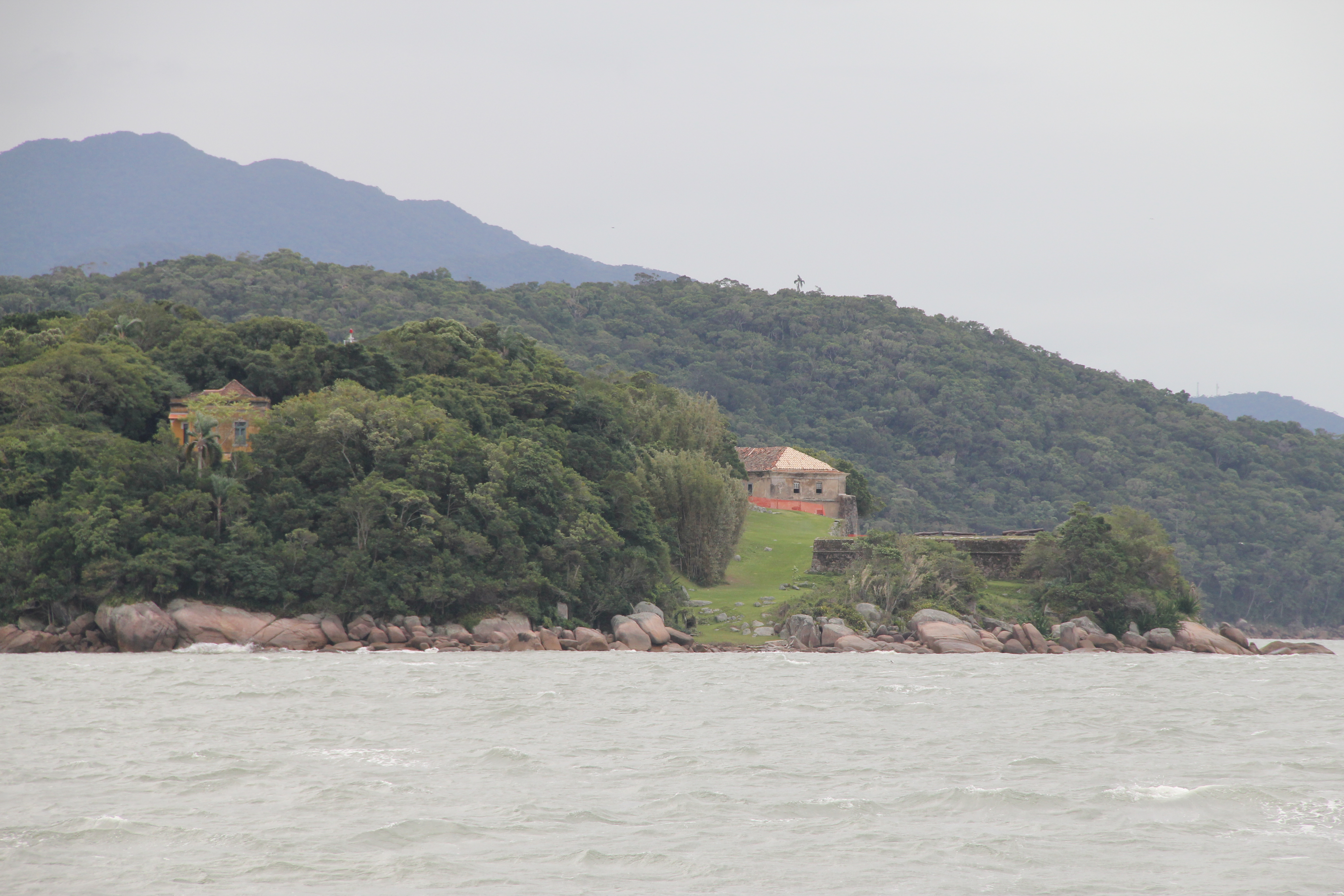
- View of Fortaleza de Santa Cruz de Anhatomirim

- Location within Brazil
- Nearest city: Florianópolis, Santa Catarina
- Coordinates: 27.414°S 48.580°W
- Area: 4,436.56 hectares (10,963.0 acres)
- Designation: Environmental Protection Area
- Created: 20 May 1992

Anhatomirim Environmental Protection Area (Portuguese: Área de Proteção Ambiental de Anhatomirim) is a protected area to the north of Florianópolis on the coast of Santa Catarina, Brazil.

== Formation ==
The coastal marine reserve, with an area of 4,436.56 hectares (10,963.0 acres), was created on 20 May 1992. It is administered by the Chico Mendes Institute for Biodiversity Conservation. The name comes from the island of Anhatomirim, on which a fortress was built by the Portuguese in 1735, later used as a political prison in the time of Floriano Peixoto. It comprises an area of land opposite the Fortaleza de Santa Cruz de Anhatomirim and the surrounding water up to 1 kilometre (0.62 mi) from the land. It lies in the municipality of Governador Celso Ramos, Santa Catarina.

The area is IUCN protected area category V (protected landscape/seascape). The purpose is to protect biological diversity and ensure the sustainable use of natural resources. Specific goals include protecting the feeding and reproduction area of the resident population of Tucuxi (Sotalia fluviatilis) freshwater dolphins, and protecting remnants of the Atlantic Rain Forest and water sources needed for survival of local fishing communities.

== Ecology ==
The terrain is generally flat or undulating, with the highest point at 445 metres (1,460 ft) Most of the forest is secondary Atlantic Forest in different stages of regeneration, but there is some preserved dense forest, mainly on the slopes of the Serra da Armação. There are also small mangroves and sandbanks. Migratory species include southern right whale (Eubalaena australis), common bottlenose dolphin (Tursiops truncatus), La Plata dolphin (Pontoporia blainvillei), swallow-tailed kite (Elanoides forficatus), South American tern (Sterna hirundinacea) and rufous-thighed kite (Harpagus diodon).

Protected species include loggerhead sea turtle (Caretta caretta), green sea turtle (Chelonia mydas), La Plata dolphin and restinga tyrannulet (Phylloscartes kronei). The numbers of tourists visiting the waters by boat for dolphin watching has disturbed these animals, and some researchers have suggested limits if not an outright ban on this activity.

== See also ==
- Anhatomirim Island

== Sources ==
- APA de Anhatomirim (in Portuguese), Chico Mendes Institute for Biodiversity Conservation
- Área de Proteção Ambiental Anhatomirim (in Portuguese), Via Rural, archived from the original on 2011-08-23
- Mapa Interativo, ICMBio, archived from the original on 2016-06-17
- Unidade de Conservação: Área de Proteção Ambiental de Anhatomirim (in Portuguese), MMA: Ministério do Meio Ambiente
