= Primate reintroduction =

Release of captive primates into the wild

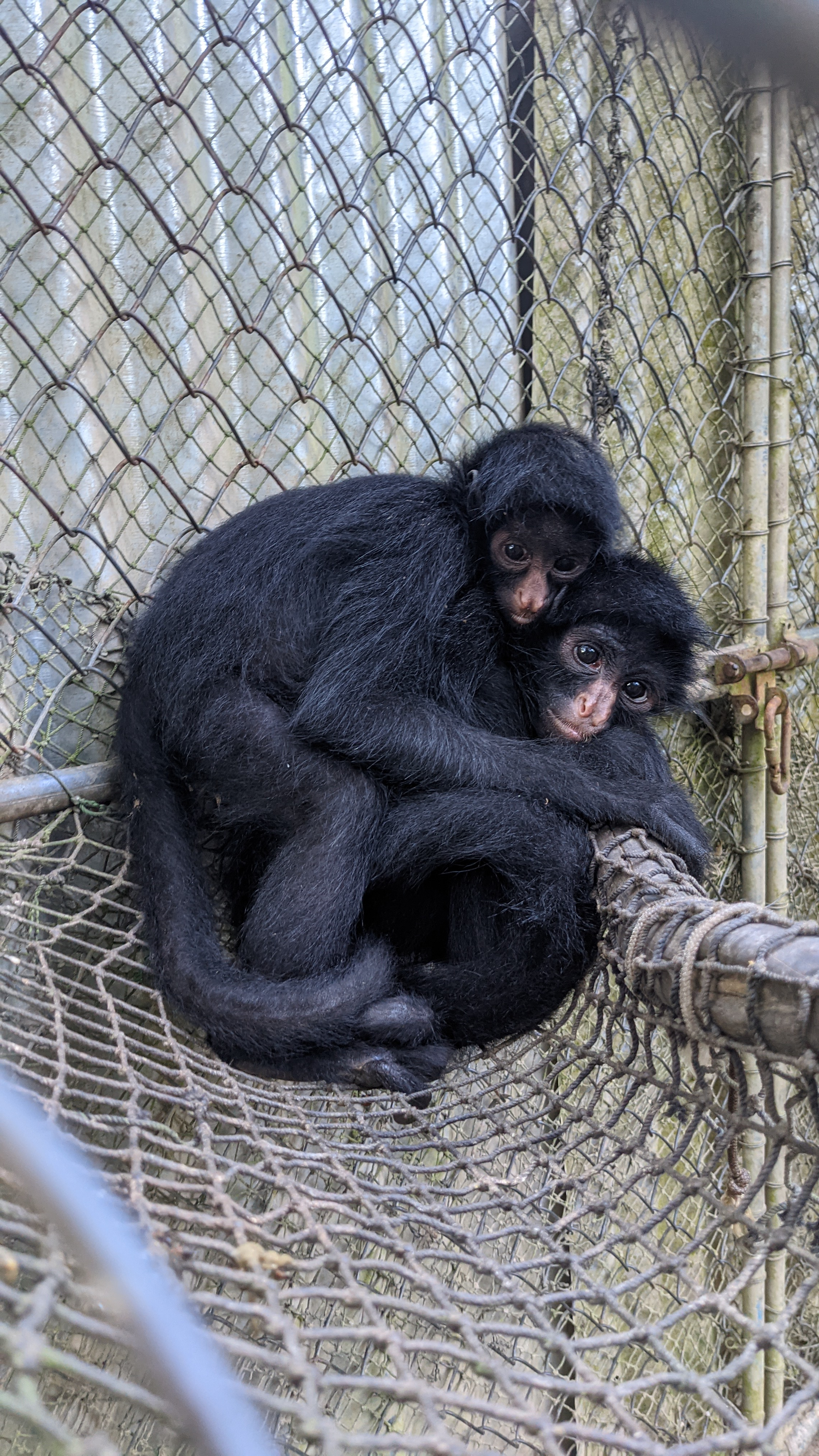
Black faced black spider monkeys (Ateles chamek) in rehabilitation at Taricaya Eco Reserve, Peru

Primate reintroduction is a form of species reintroduction and is the process by which captive or previously free-ranging primates are either translocated or rehabilitated and released into the wild. The goals of primate reintroduction efforts are typically to reestablish or reinforce wild populations, improve the welfare of reintroduced individuals, and/or restore ecosystems (i.e. seed distribution). Primate reintroduction is associated with primate rehabilitation which is a form of wildlife rehabilitation that provides care and treatment for individual primates that have been injured, orphaned or abandoned in preparation for reintroduction back into the wild. Rehabilitation and reintroduction together are a strategy to combat the widespread decline of primate biodiversity worldwide and keep primate species and their habitats safe from extinction. The rehabilitated primates are most frequently formerly captive monkeys confiscated or rescued from the illegal pet and bushmeat trades.

== Causes for primate biodiversity decline ==
It is commonly accepted by scientists that we are living through the sixth mass extinction (Holocene extinction) with species decline occurring at the highest rate since the last mass extinction, primarily due to anthropogenic forces. As of 2017 approximately 60% of all primate species are considered threatened and over 75% of populations are in decline.

=== Climate change ===
Primate habitat is increasingly threatened by the wide ranging impacts of climate change, with significant land cover change and catastrophic weather events causing habitat loss, fragmentation and impacting food supply. It is predicted that primate habitats will experience climate warming that is 10% higher than the global mean and will be increasingly vulnerable to significant precipitation shifts and extreme weather events. Further predictions show that over the coming decades climate change will impact primate species both directly as temperature increases and indirectly through the effects on other drivers of endangerment and extinction (i.e. habitat fragmentation, loss of symbiotic species, spread of infectious diseases, etc.).

=== Habitat fragmentation and degradation ===
Like many species, primates are particularly sensitive to changes in their habitat, the degradation, fragmentation and loss of which can have devastating consequences on population and species decline. The forests inhabited by primates are being threatened by intensive agriculture, cattle ranching, logging, gas drilling, road construction and mining worldwide. Over the course of 20 years, from 1990 to 2010 there was over two million km2 of forest loss throughout verified primate habitat and agriculture expanded by over 1.5 million km2 throughout primate ranges.

=== Disease ===
Monkeys and apes often have and share diseases with humans, causing increasing concern as the boundaries between humans and wildlife are lowered. Global disease outbreaks such as swine flu and ebola caused devastation in primate and human communities alike, which are exacerbated by the environmental changes increasing the proximity between humans and wildlife. Habitat fragmentation, especially for agriculture, also increases the risk of disease transmission between the released primates, humans and their livestock.

== Causes for orphaned and/or abandoned captive primates ==
=== Trafficking and trade ===
There are both legal and illegal routes in the primate trade, for a range of uses such as consumption, pets, zoos and entertainment, biomedical research, traditional medicine and as prized objects in folklore. The documented trafficking of primates impacts hundreds of thousands of individuals annually and is incredibly lucrative for the people involved in the trade, with the undocumented illegal trade estimated to impact an even greater number of individuals. The trade of primates is both legal and organized, as well as illegal and opportunistic, much of which is influenced by the local politics of the areas from which the primates are being removed from the wild.

=== Hunting ===
Both commercial hunting and subsistence bushmeat hunting contribute to the decline of primate populations and to the growing issue of injured and orphaned individual primates. The bushmeat trade provides both food for people living locally within primate habitat and is also transported globally as part of an illegal international market.

== Rehabilitation and reintroduction ==
=== IUCN Guidelines for Primate Reintroductions ===
In 2002 the Reintroduction Specialist Group of the International Union for the Conservation of Nature (IUCN) Species Survival Commission (SSC) produced their Guidelines for Nonhuman Primate Reintroductions (GNPR), which is considered to be a best practice model for any primate rehabilitation and reintroduction effort.

=== Welfare considerations ===
Rescue, rehabilitation and reintroduction of formerly captive or wild-born primates provides placement for vulnerable individuals with welfare at the front of mind. In a review on primate reintroductions prior to 2014, it was found that the majority of reintroduction efforts only complied with around 53% of the GNPR, one of the greatest failures being a significant absence of the recommended post-release monitoring. As the guidelines establish best practices to prioritize and monitor individual welfare, any deviation from the guidelines may have negative consequences on welfare.

=== Conservation considerations ===
Primate reintroductions can be particularly effective for conservation efforts when employed in areas where primates had previously been extirpated. Primates are often considered to be important seed dispersers in their native ecosystems, critical for the regeneration of flowering plants. For example, studies show that in the Taï region in western Côte-d'Ivoire, monkeys are responsible for dispersing the seeds of 52 species of trees, only 12 of which are dispersed by animals other than monkeys. In addition, primate reintroductions can serve as an excellent public and political tool to educate and raise awareness for the plight of primates and their ecosystems.

=== Aspects of the rehabilitation phase ===
==== Genetics ====
One of the goals of the GNPR is to supplement wild stock of primates to increase the genetic variety and must be managed with great caution so as not to cause unnatural irregularities. This is especially important in cases where wild primates in the release site have small populations in fragmented ecosystems where there is little genetic mixing between populations. Genetic aberration is one of the greatest risks of reintroduction with certain species because without proper genetic testing there is the possibility of mixing distinct subspecies . The GNPR recommends that genetic testing occurs during the quarantine period of rehabilitation, prior to forming release groups.

==== Veterinary care ====
Prior to reintroduction, individuals must go through a thorough quarantine and disease screening process under the care of a veterinarian. Quarantine lengths may vary, but the IUCN recommends an ideal quarantine period of 90 days during which the individual primate be kept in an area of isolation to conduct initial exams, allow them to adapt to their new environment and screen for any potential diseases. This process is critical not only for the safety of the individuals, but for the health and safety of the social group they will be placed into and for wild animals in the area of the release site.

==== Social groups ====
Primates should not be reintroduced as individuals, but in socially appropriate groups mimicking wild social groups as best as possible. The formation of groups should occur after quarantine in rehabilitation which is considered to be the process of resocialization. This is a particularly important step in the rehabilitation process because primates are social learners in that they pass on knowledge and skills about locating and processing foods, detecting and avoiding predators, locating sleeping sites to their conspecifics.

==== Survival skills ====
It is critical that prior to reintroduction, the individuals have the opportunity to learn essential skills for survival in the wild. Survival training includes a wide variety of factors depending on the species, but it is recommended that the rehabilitation group be placed in a semi-wild enclosure and have as limited contact with human caregivers as possible. Some common elements of survival training may include learning to identify edible foods, avoiding unsafe locations and substrates and self protection from potential predators. Some rehabilitation training occurs in the captive enclosures, while other programs will arrange regular outings into the release area with the primates prior to reintroduction.

=== Ecological factors and release site ===
There are a variety of ecological factors that the GNPR advises be considered prior to reintroduction primarily centered around the habitat quality of the release site. The release site should be part of the species natural historic range and must be ecologically robust enough to sustain the release group in the long term. Ecological factors that should be taken into consideration when selecting the release site include but are not limited to the abundance, productivity, density and diversity of important foods for the species, the threats to the ecosystem, and sufficient carrying capacity to support the release group and potential future offspring.

==== Human factors ====
If a reintroduction is to be successful, there must be cooperation and collaboration with the local people. Informed by past attempts at reintroduction, researchers recommend that involving the local community in the research and management of reintroduction projects is important for the long-term success of the program. It is further recommended that the leaders of the reintroduction project provide some form of conservation education for people living in proximity to the release site about the important role primates play in the ecosystem and the threats they face.

==== Legal and financial factors ====
Primate reintroductions can only be carried out with express and written permission from all government authorities with jurisdiction on relevant matters and with transparency. The entire process of rehabilitation and reintroduction is costly, and the leaders of the reintroduction project must ensure there are sufficient finances secured for the entire process, including long-term post release monitoring.

==== Post release monitoring ====
Post release monitoring is the process by which the reintroduced primates will be tracked and observed after they have entered their new environment. This is an important part of the reintroduction process, as it helps determine the success of the project and identify if any individuals are injured, die or fail to adapt and may also include the monitoring of other factors such as impact on their environment, reproductivity and socioecological factors. Reintroduction monitoring can be conducted through a variety of methods such as on the ground follows, VHF radio collar tracking, and GPS collar tracking.

=== Risks and challenges ===
There are a variety of potential negative consequences to reintroduction which can be exacerbated by the conditions of the rehabilitation and release process. The transfer of disease between released individuals or more consequently, from released individuals to wild populations can be devastating if the release group does not receive sufficient pre-release testing. Another risk of reintroduction is the potential to cause increased competition with wild populations for resources, mates and space.
