= Arvoredo Marine Biological Reserve =

- Reserva Biológica Marinha do Arvoredo
- IUCN category Ia (strict nature reserve)
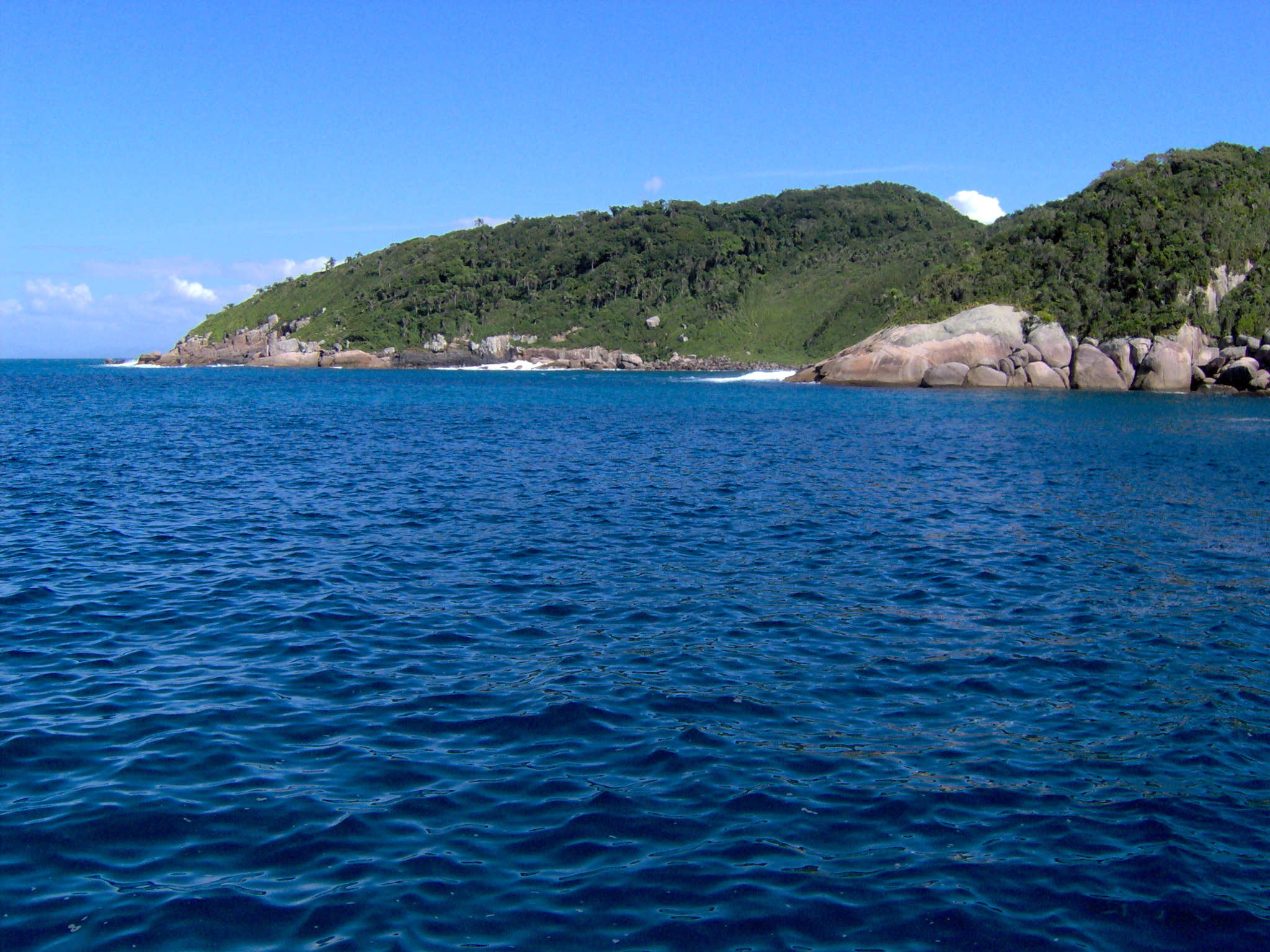
- The coast at Ilha do Arvoredo, with Atlantic Forest ecoregion tropical forest habitat on the slopes

- Location within Brazil
- Location: Santa Catarina, Brazil
- Nearest city: Tijucas
- Coordinates: 27.282°S 48.365°W
- Area: 17,104 hectares (42,260 acres)
- Designation: Biological reserve
- Established: 12 March 1990

Arvoredo Marine Biological Reserve (Portuguese: Reserva Biológica Marinha do Arvoredo) is a Biological reserve off the coast of the Santa Catarina state, Brazil.

== Location ==
The Biological Reserve, which covers 17,104 hectares (42,260 acres), was established on 12 March 1990. It lies in the municipalities of Bombinhas, Florianópolis and Governador Celso Ramos of the state of Santa Catarina. The reserve is a transition region for seaweed flora, including organisms typical of both temperate and tropical regions. The reserve is close to the Subtropical Convergence where the Brazil Current from the north converges with the Falkland Current from the south. The surface waters are dominated by the Tropical Shelf Water while below 20 metres (66 ft) in depth the water is from the South Atlantic Central Water.

The Arvoredo archipelago (27°17' S; 48°28' W) is formed by three islands (Arvoredo, Galés and Deserta) and a rocky outcrop (São Pedro). The archipelago lies over the continental platform and is characterized by the presence of Precambrian crystalline rock shorelines. The depth throughout the archipelago varies from 5 to 25 metres (16 to 82 ft), rarely deeper than 30 metres (98 ft).

- Arvoredo is the largest island 318.6 hectares (787 acres), with highly accident relief and steep coastlines providing sites sheltered from the dominant northern quadrant winds and from the strong southern winds. Along its southern rocky-shore SCUBA diving is permitted, as the shoreline in this area lies outside of the reserve limits.
- Galés Island 39.7 hectares (98 acres), the closest to the continent, has the same rocky formation as Arvoredo island, with few scarps and two small islets divided by a 27 metres (89 ft) deep channel from the main island.
- Deserta Island 13.2 hectares (33 acres) has a well scarped shoreline which is influenced by strong waves due to its southwest–northeast orientation; its relief is elevated in the northern area, with a strong decline southwards.

A few outcrops can be found in the region, such as Pedra Noceti, Parcel do Boi and Parcel da Deserta. The rocky habitat is characterized by many cavities formed by large boulders and medium-small sized pebbles covered with seaweed.

== Conservation ==
The reserve is administered by the Chico Mendes Institute for Biodiversity Conservation. The reserve is classed as IUCN protected area category Ia (strict nature reserve). The purpose is to protect the biota and other natural attributes without human interference.

Protected species include the starfish species Asterina stellifera, Astropecten brasiliensis, Astropecten marginatus, Coscinasterias tenuispina, Narcissia trigonaria and Oreaster reticulatus, loggerhead sea turtle (Caretta caretta), green sea turtle (Chelonia mydas), hawksbill sea turtle (Eretmochelys imbricata), olive ridley sea turtle (Lepidochelys olivacea), southern right whale (Eubalaena australis), La Plata dolphin (Pontoporia blainvillei), narrownose smooth-hound (Mustelus schmitti), tube-dwelling anemone (Cerianthomorphe brasiliensis), neon goby (Elacatinus figaro), slate pencil urchin (Eucidaris tribuloides), sea cucumber (Isostichopus badionotus), decapod (Minyocerus angustus), sea urchin (Paracentrotus gaimardi), white-chinned petrel (Procellaria aequinoctialis), Atlantic yellow-nosed albatross (Thalassarche chlororhynchos) and black-browed albatross (Thalassarche melanophris).

== Sources ==
- Bouzon, JL; Freire, AS (2007), "The Brachyura and Anomura fauna (Decapoda; Crustacea) in the Arvoredo Marine Biological Reserve on the southern Brazilian coast", Brazilian Journal of Biology, 67 (2), PMID 17876443
- Horta, Paulo Antunes; Salles, José Pedrassoli; Bouzon, Janayna L.; Bouzon, Zenilda L.; Scherner, Fernando; Cabral, Débora Queiroz; Bouzon, Zenilda L. (2008), "Subtidal phytobenthus composition and structure of the Arvoredo Marine Biological Reserve, Santa Catarina, Brazil - Implications to the conservation", Oecologia Australis, 12 (2)
- Rebio Marinha do Arvoredo (in Portuguese), Chico Mendes Institute for Biodiversity Conservation
- Unidade de Conservação: Reserva Biológica Marinha do Arvoredo (in Portuguese), MMA: Ministério do Meio Ambiente
