= Anhatomirim Island =

- Island
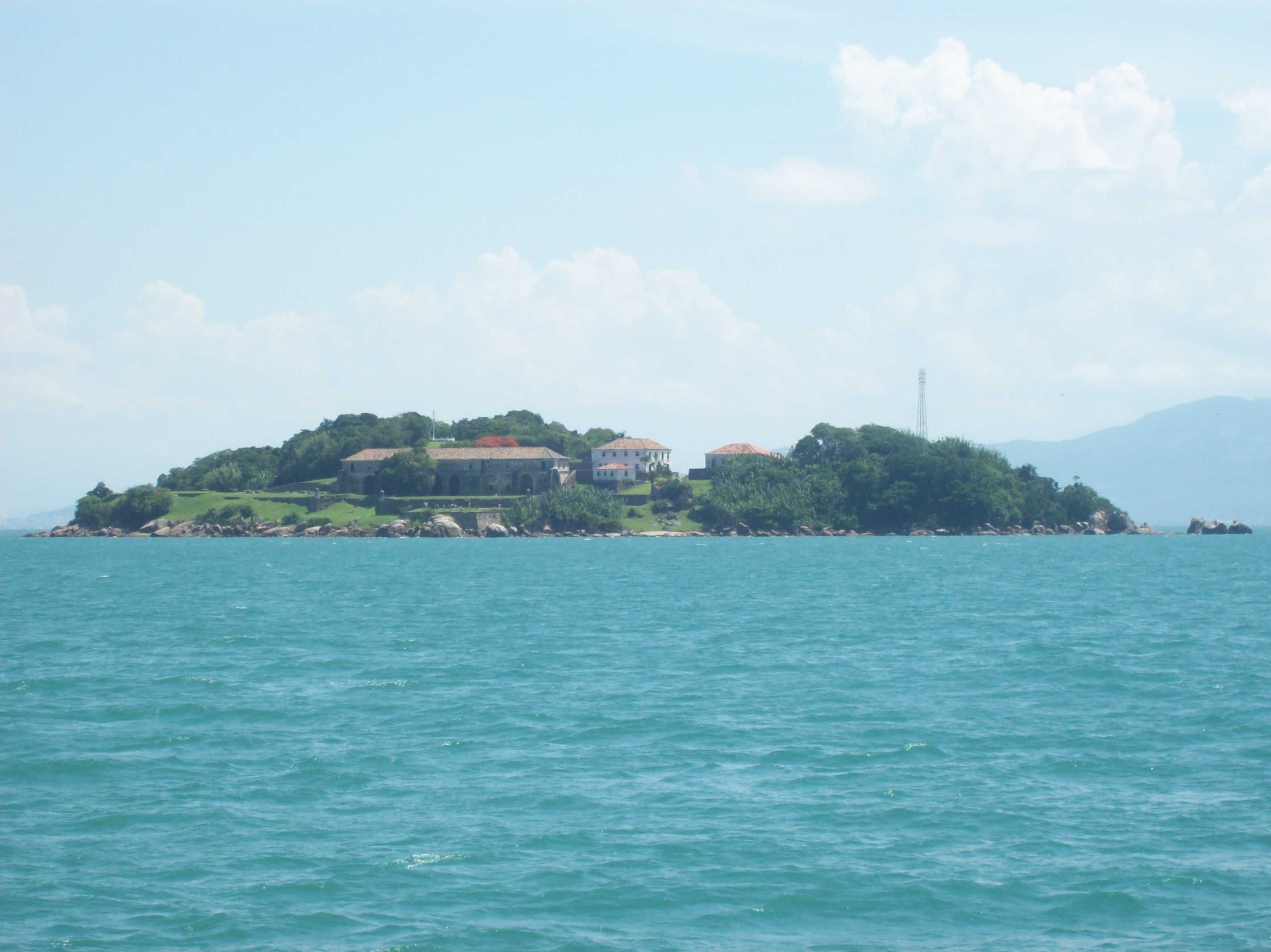
- Interactive map of Anhatomirim Island
- Coordinates: 27°25′39″S 48°33′52″W
- Country: Brazil
- Municipality: Governo Celso Ramos
- Division: Florianapolis
- State: Santa Catarina

Area
  - Total: 00.45 km^{2} (0.17 sq mi)
- Highest elevation: 31 m (102 ft)

Anhatomirim Island (Portuguese: Ilha de Anhatomirim) is located in the Atlantic Ocean, on the southern coast of Brazil, between Santa Catarina Island and the continental mainland of the North Bay. It is part of the municipality of Governador Celso Ramos. One of the main fortresses of Southern Brazil, the Fortaleza de Santa Cruz de Anhatomirim, was built on the island in the 18th century in order to protect what is now called Florianópolis. During the First Brazilian Republic, the island was used to execute approximately 170 political and military prisoners during the Federalist Revolution. The island is considered an environmental protection area.
