= Isostichopus macroparentheses =

Conservation status
- Endangered (IUCN 3.1)

Scientific classification
- Kingdom: Animalia
- Phylum: Echinodermata
- Class: Holothuroidea
- Order: Synallactida
- Family: Stichopodidae
- Genus: Isostichopus
- Species: I. macroparentheses

Binomial name
- Isostichopus macroparentheses (Clark, 1922)

Synonyms
- Stichopus macroparentheses Clark, 1922

Species of sea cucumber

Isostichopus macroparentheses is a species of sea cucumber in the family Stichopodidae. It is found in the Caribbean Sea and the Gulf of Mexico.
