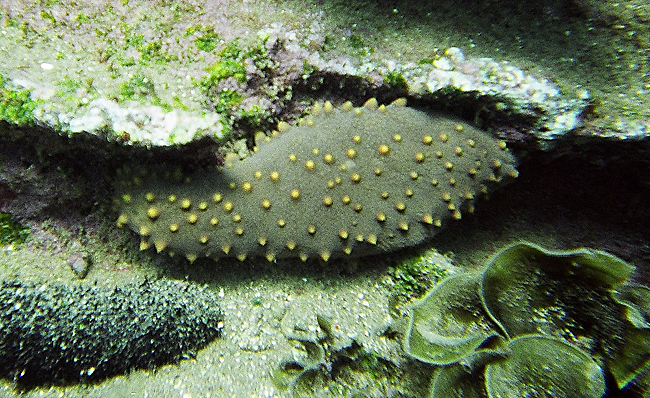

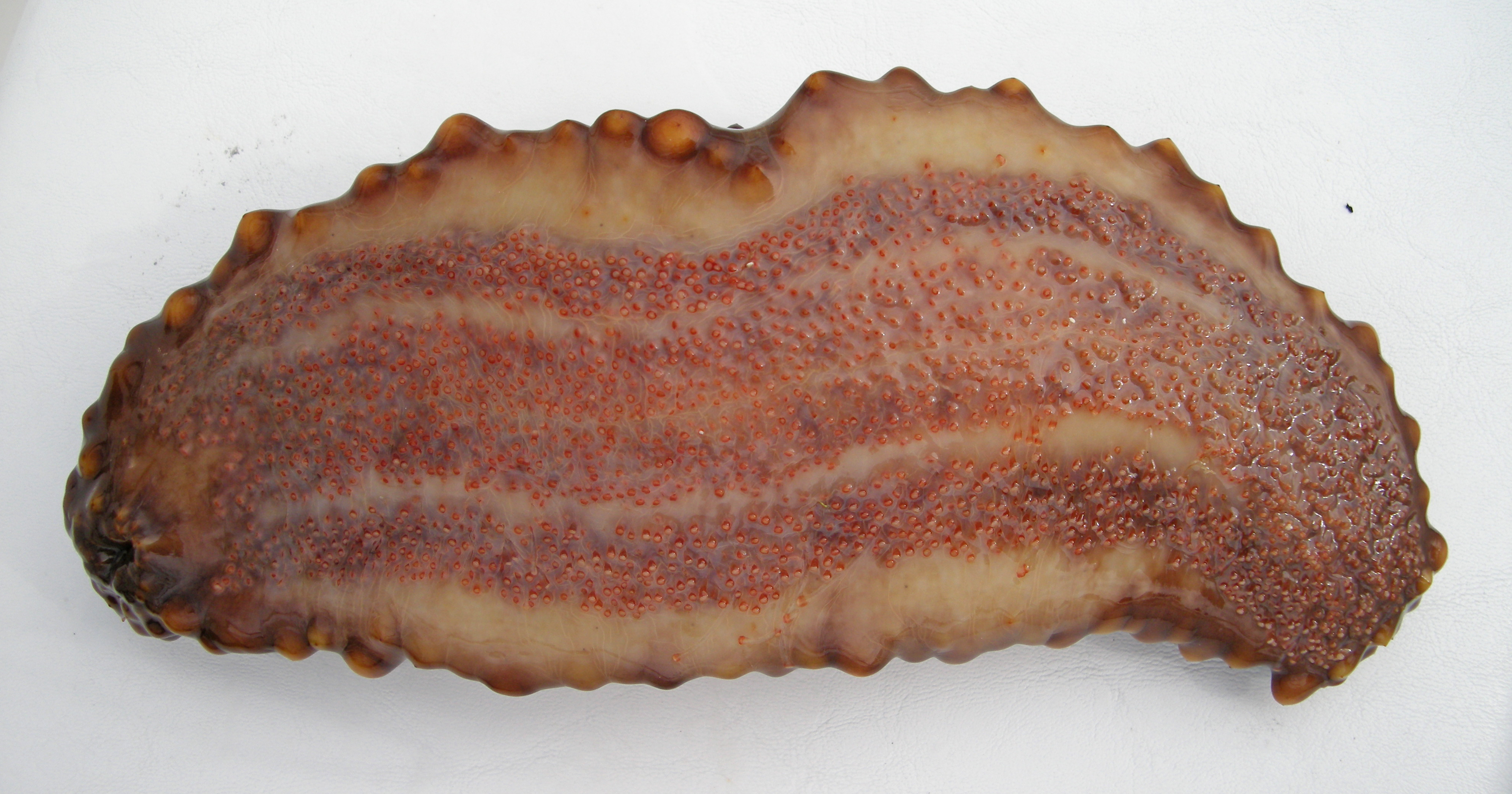
- Isostichopus fuscus underside

Conservation status
- Critically Endangered (IUCN 3.1)

Scientific classification
- Kingdom: Animalia
- Phylum: Echinodermata
- Class: Holothuroidea
- Order: Synallactida
- Family: Stichopodidae
- Genus: Isostichopus
- Species: I. fuscus

Binomial name
- Isostichopus fuscus (Ludwig, 1875)

= Isostichopus fuscus =

Species of sea cucumber

Isostichopus fuscus, commonly known as the brown sea cucumber, is a species of sea cucumber in the family Stichopodidae native to the eastern Pacific. It was first described to science by German biologist Hubert Ludwig in 1875.

It has a thick dermis without any spikes, making it an easily edible species and thus it is harvested for export to East Asia, where sea cucumber is popular in some cuisines. The fishery is typically conducted in an unsustainable manner, mostly in North and South America, which has caused the populations to decline. The brown sea cucumber is classified by the IUCN as Critically Endangered.

== Distribution and habitat ==
This species is found in the Pacific Coast of Mexico, including the Gulf of California, and down through Central America to South America as far as the northern coast of Peru, as well as in eastern Pacific islands, including the Galápagos. They are found in shallow waters, roughly 0 to 40 m deep in rocky reefs, although 3 to 29 m are a preferred range. Additionally, reefs with sandy patches seem to be a preferred substrate. Within these depths, I. fuscus has been found to predominate areas where high amounts of Ulva sp. are located. The species tends to be more active at night as during the daytime they are cryptic and being active would make them more visible to predators.

== Feeding ==
Like other sea cucumber, I. fuscus is a deposit feeder, whose survival tends to increase with soft-substrates such as sand or clay. Recent studies suggest that a blend of seaweed species such as P. durvillaei and S. ecuadoreanum are an optimal diet, although they can survive off of other types of seaweed.

== Morphology ==
The brown sea cucumber are quite small organisms, with average body length and weight being 23 cm and 386 g, respectively. The largest samples have been recorded reaching up to 40 cm and weighing 830 g, although weight varies seasonally according to reproduction and the maturity stage. The species grows allometrically, meaning that increases with body length are also associated with increases in weight. Isostichopus fuscus is dioecious. Gonads can only be determined and sexed under a microscope. There is no apparent sexual dimorphism among individuals, unless gonads are ripe. When gonads are ripe, males are a white color, while females gonads are orange. The brown sea cucumber has an elongated body and can be described as having a soft or gelatinous texture. Their general body shape is curved, similar to a half circle, and they have a dark brown coloration and are spotted with orange papillae. They have ambulacral extensions on their underside which are used to help with locomotion.

Typically, the brown sea cucumber is a brown color, as evident by its name. However, in 2013, the first ever record of albinism was discovered in the brown sea cucumber. Two albino individuals were found: one in Loreto, Mexico and the other in the Los Angeles Bay.

== Reproductive cycle ==
=== Sexual reproduction ===
Spawning occurs in Isostichopus fuscus from July to September, with post-spawning gonads occurring in October. Gametogenesis was documented between January and July, with oogenesis occurring approximately one month before spermatogenesis. Peaks in reproduction followed by drastic declines have characterized I. fuscus as an episodic spawner, in which water temperature is thought to play a large role as a reproductive indicator.

The reproductive cycle of the brown sea cucumber consists of five gonadal stages: under-determined, gametogenesis, maturity, spawning and post-spawning. The species moves through these 5 stages on an annual cycle. In the undetermined stage, gametes or gonads observed in the individuals, and therefore they are sexually viable. Any gonads that can be observed cannot be accurately distinguished at this stage. Connective tissue in the lumen is present and the gonadal wall is thickened The following four stages are different among males and females.

In males, the gametogenesis stage is called spermatogenesis, and refers to when there is a build up of sperm in the gonads. During spermatogenesis, folds in the gonadal wall are present that the lumen. Additionally, Spherical spermatocytes accumulate at the periphery. The accumulation of spermatocytes causes a decrease in the thickness of the connective tissue. During the maturity, the follicles of the gonads are filled with multiple layers of mature sperm. The mature spermatozoa exhibit a rounded shape are slightly dorso-ventrally flattened. A thin layer of spermatocytes is present at the periphery. Spawning is when the individuals have mated, and therefore the follicles in the gonads are empty due to the sperm being released. Developing spermatocytes are still present at the periphery layer. a layer of connective tissue is present at the gonad wall The gonadal wall is observed to thicken, and folds are present inside of the wall. Spawning in brown sea cucumbers occurs throughout the summer months. Finally, in post spawning, large quantity of phagocytes is present both inside and outside of the follicles. Connective tissue is reabsorbed in the gonadal wall of the follicle, the gonads are engulfed by phagocytes, therefore ending a single reproductive cycle in males.

In females, the gametogenesis stage is called oogenesis, and is when the oocytes are young and in the process of developing. Oogonia are attached to the germinal epithelium in the lumen. The oocytes are arranged in a single layer, and have a defined nucleus and peripheral nucleoli. The connective tissue and folds in the gonad gradually reduce as oogenesis progresses. In the maturity stage, the oocytes are mature and have reached their maximum size. Oocytes are present in all tubules in the lumen, and their peripheral nuclei are distinguishable. Connective tissue is absent, and the gonadal wall is very thin (3). Phagocytes surround the inside and outside of the lumen. During the spawning stage, there is a decrease in the number of oocytes and an absence of gametes due to spawning. A layer of connective tissue is present at the gonad wall The gonadal wall is observed to thicken, and folds are present inside of the wall. Any of the remaining oocytes are either in maturity or oogenesis Lastly, in post spawning, oocytes observed have significantly decreased in volume. Large amounts of connective tissue are present in the gonadal walls. Phagocytes are involved in reducing the number of gonads present, thus ending the reproductive cycle in females.

=== Hermaphroditic reproduction ===
Although rare, hermaphroditic samples have been collected. In these cases, the male and female follicles were in different gonadal stages, and some samples were in the spawning stages. In one case, both male and female follicles were in the spawning stages.

=== Asexual reproduction ===
The potential for asexual reproduction is possible. Like most echinoderms, I. fuscus has a unique regenerative ability. Induced transverse fission has been experimented in a lab setting. The results were successful, showing a high survival rate, and a complete regeneration of anterior and posterior body parts in a maximum of three months. The results suggest that asexual propagation could serve as a potential tool for restoring their population in the wild.

== Development ==
The development of I. fuscus is separated into larval and juvenile phases. The larval phase begins after the organism hatches from its embryonic envelope, and undergo a series of transformations for approximately 22 days; The juvenile stage is initiated afterwards.

=== Larval development ===
Embryos hatch from the fertilization envelope roughly 10 hours after fertilization. The gastrulae have an epidermal layer that is entirely ciliated and supports their movement. After approximately 24 hours, the gastrulae transform into an auricularia larvae. Feeding begins upon the transition to this stage. After 19–24 days, the doliolaria stage is reached, where the larvae shrink to 50 percent of their size. 5 days later, the pentactula stage is reached, in which the organism goes through a settlement phase.

=== Juvenile development ===
Early settled juveniles are typically 1-1.5 mm in length. Over a 3-4 week period, they undergo rapid growth at an average rate of 0.5–1 mm/day. The juveniles begin to develop brown pigment when they reach a length of approximately 5 mm, and tentacles are visible at about 8mm. At approximately day 52, papillae and an elongated intestine, which suggest peristaltic movements become present. The tegument thickness increase, and the epidermis transforms from a transparent to opaque appearance. At 2 cm in length, the coloration fades to a brown that is characteristic of an adult brown sea cucumber.

== Fisheries and uses ==
The brown sea cucumber is a highly sought out commodity in many North and South American countries, including Mexico, Costa Rica and Ecuador. Sea cucumber fishing is also seen as the most important fishing activity in the Galápagos Islands. As it is such a common item in the fisheries of these countries, overfishing and overexploitation of the brown sea cucumber is a vast problem. Due to the endangered state of the brown sea cucumber, the Galápagos Marine Reserve and all major stakeholders took it upon themselves to monitor its population in the Galápagos twice a year between 1999 and 2003 in order to determine the impact of the fisheries and any possible solutions for it. The lowest total density of the population was seen following the 2003 fishing season, and due to this ultimate low, the recovery of the brown sea cucumber population is seen as unlikely due to both the legal and illegal fishing of them.

Sea cucumbers are typically used in traditional Chinese medicines as well as in many Asian and South American cuisines. Like most other holothurians, the brown sea cucumber is a very nutritional food source. It is high in protein, low in fat and contains many amino acids necessary for keeping us healthy. It is often combined with other ingredients in soups and stews and more recently, dried sea cucumber is made into tablets and has been marketed as a nutritional supplement.

Due to the unsustainable fisheries pertaining to this species as well as its high demand in many Asian and South American cuisines, it has ultimately caused a decline in not just Isostichopus fuscus, but many holothurian populations.
