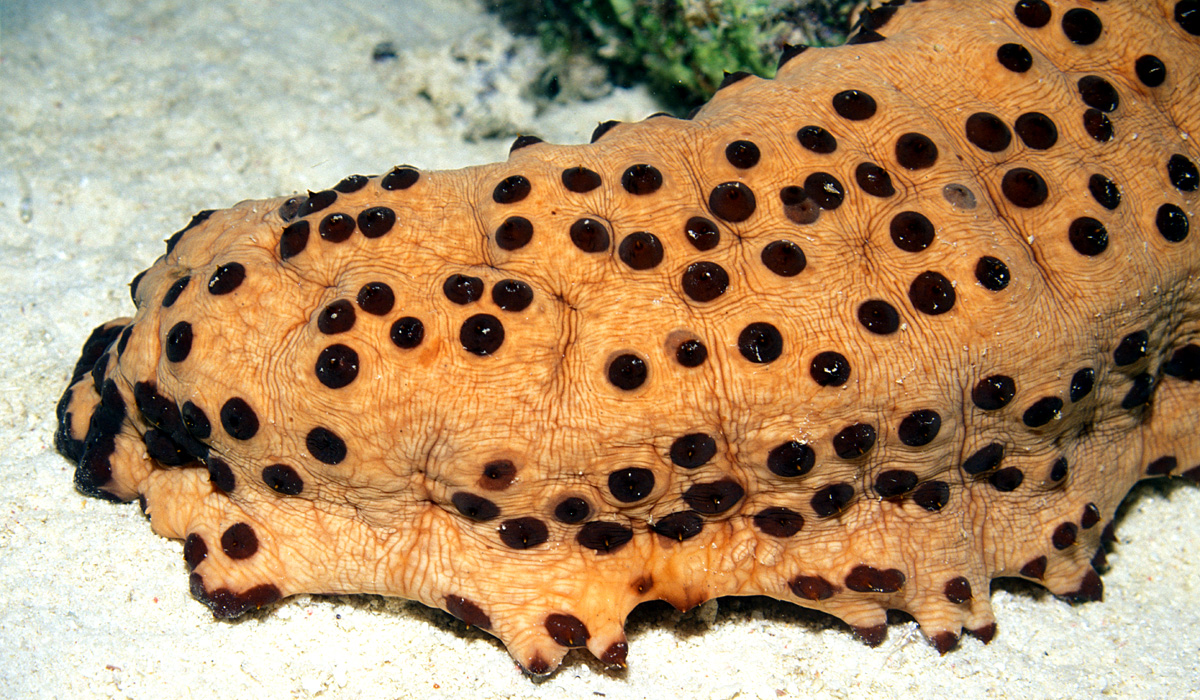
- Isostichopus badionotus

Scientific classification
- Domain: Eukaryota
- Kingdom: Animalia
- Phylum: Echinodermata
- Class: Holothuroidea
- Order: Synallactida
- Family: Stichopodidae; Haeckel, 1896
- Genus: Isostichopus; Deichmann, 1958

Species
- See text

= Isostichopus =

Genus of sea cucumbers

Isostichopus is a genus of sea cucumbers.

== List of species ==
- Isostichopus badionotus (Selenka, 1867) (warm Atlantic)
- Isostichopus fuscus (Ludwig, 1875) (tropical east Pacific Ocean)
- Isostichopus macroparentheses (Clark, 1922) (Caribbean, rare)
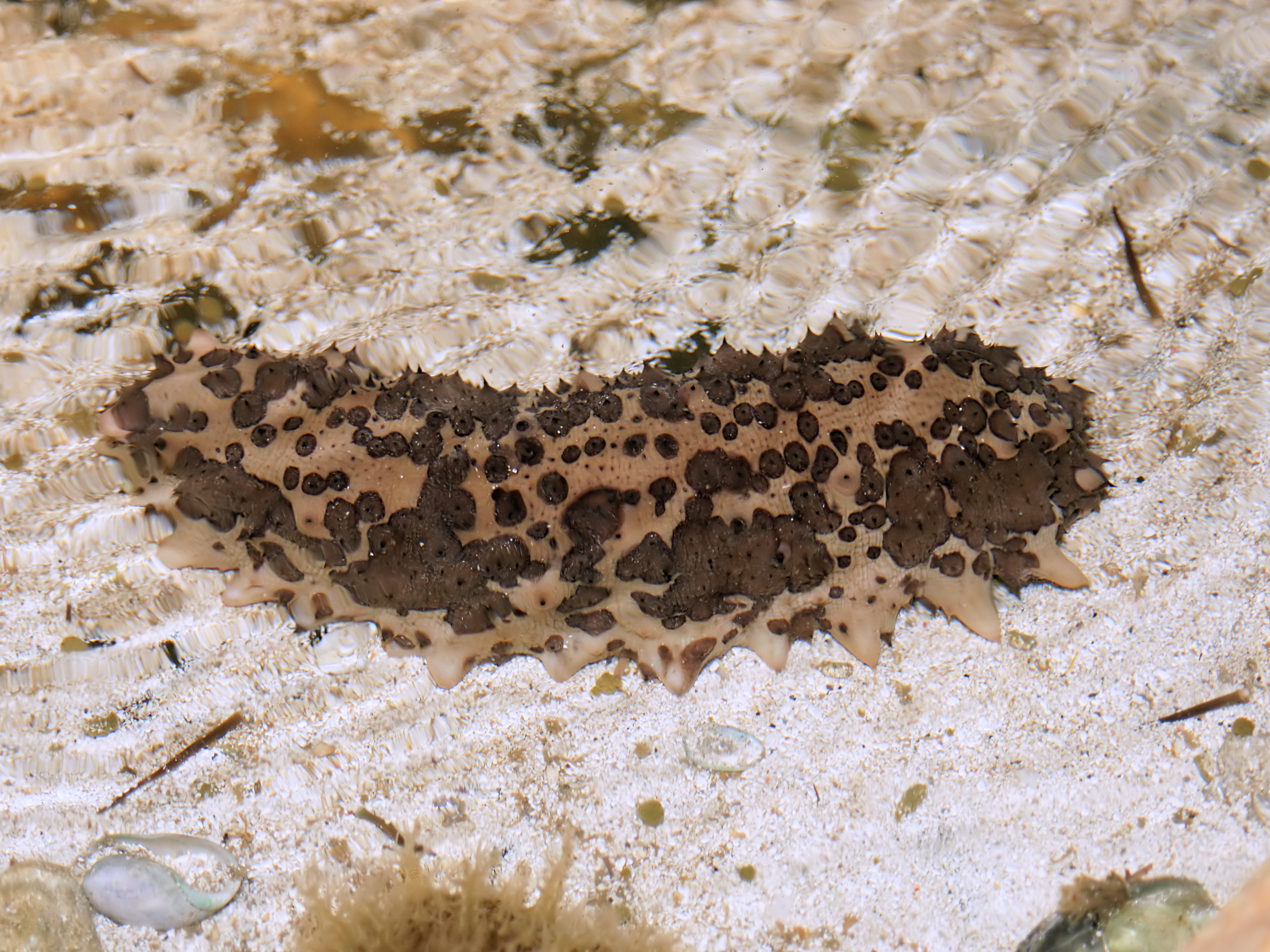
Isostichopus badionotus

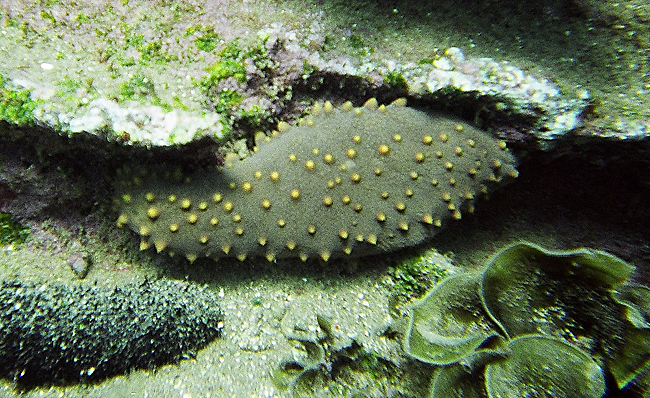
Isostichopus fuscus
