= Fortaleza de Santa Cruz de Anhatomirim =

- Governador Celso Ramos, Santa Catarina in Brazil
- View of the old barracks of the fortress

Site information
- Type: Fort
- Open to the public: Yes
- Condition: Good

Location
- Location of Fortaleza de Anhatomirim in Brazil
- Coordinates: 27.427132°S 48.564538°W

Site history
- Built by: Jose da Silva Pais

Fortaleza de Santa Cruz de Anhatomirim is a fort located on Anhatomirim Island in the municipality of Governador Celso Ramos, Santa Catarina in Brazil. It was built by Brazilian Architect Jose da Silva Pais.

== See also ==
- Military history of Brazil
