= Bombinhas =

- Municipality
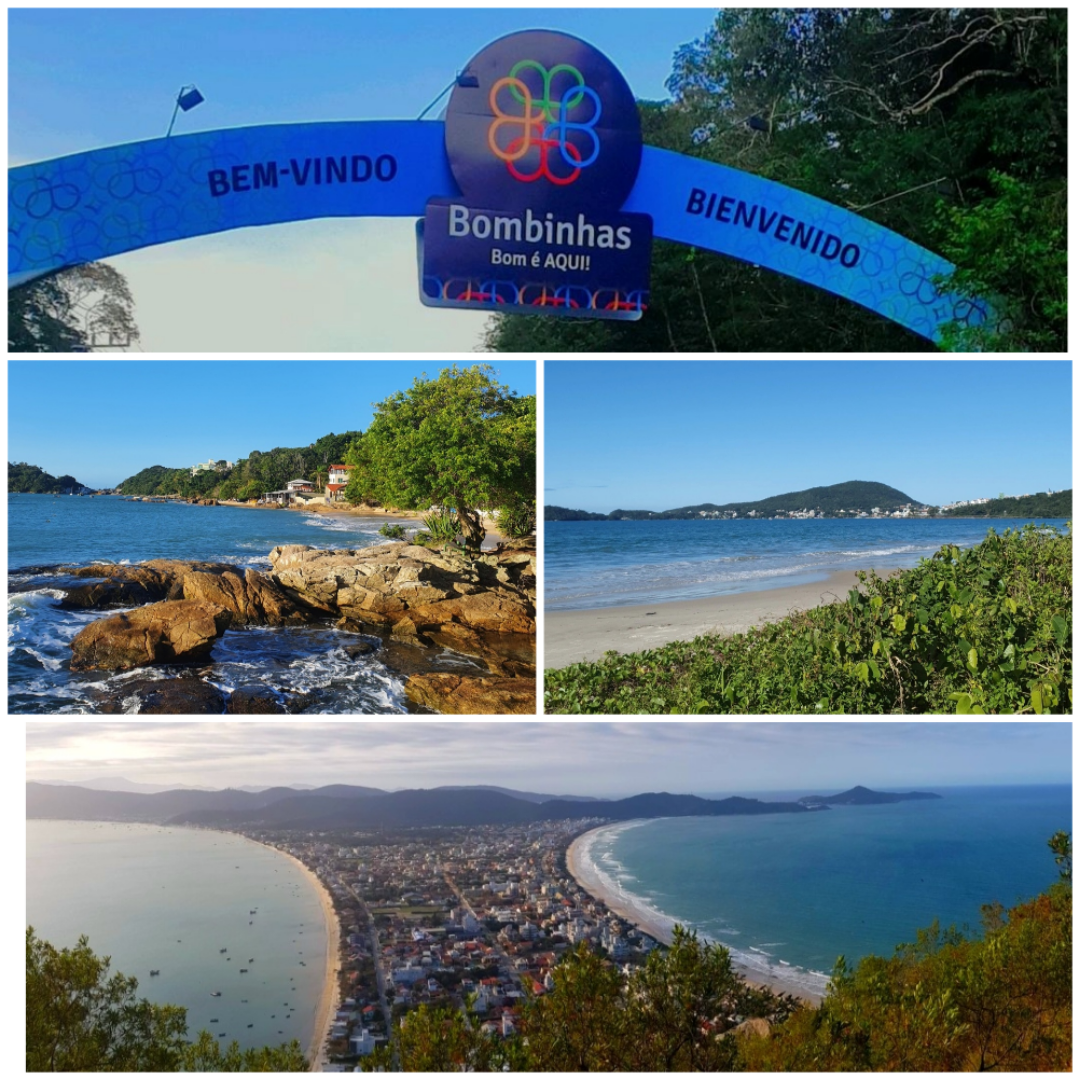
- From top to bottom, clockwise: Main entrance; sandbar on Bombas Beach; view of Morro do Macaco; view of the Bombinhas pier.

- Flag Coat of arms

- Location of Bombinhas
- Coordinates: 27°08′16″S 48°31′01″W
- Country: Brazil
- Region: South
- State: Santa Catarina
- Founded: March 30, 1992

Government
  - Mayor: Paulo Henrique Dalago Müller (PODE)

Area
  - Total: 34.489 km^{2} (13.316 sq mi)
- Elevation: 32 m (105 ft)

Population (2020)
  - Total: 20,335
  - Density: 589.61/km^{2} (1,527.1/sq mi)
- Time zone: UTC−3 (BRT)
- HDI (2010): 0.781 – high
- Website: www.bombinhas.sc.gov.br

Bombinhas is a municipality in the state of Santa Catarina in the South region of Brazil. It is the smallest municipality of that state in terms of area.

The municipality contains part of the 17,104-hectare (42,260-acre) Marinha do Arvoredo Biological Reserve, established in 1990.

== See also ==
- List of municipalities in Santa Catarina
