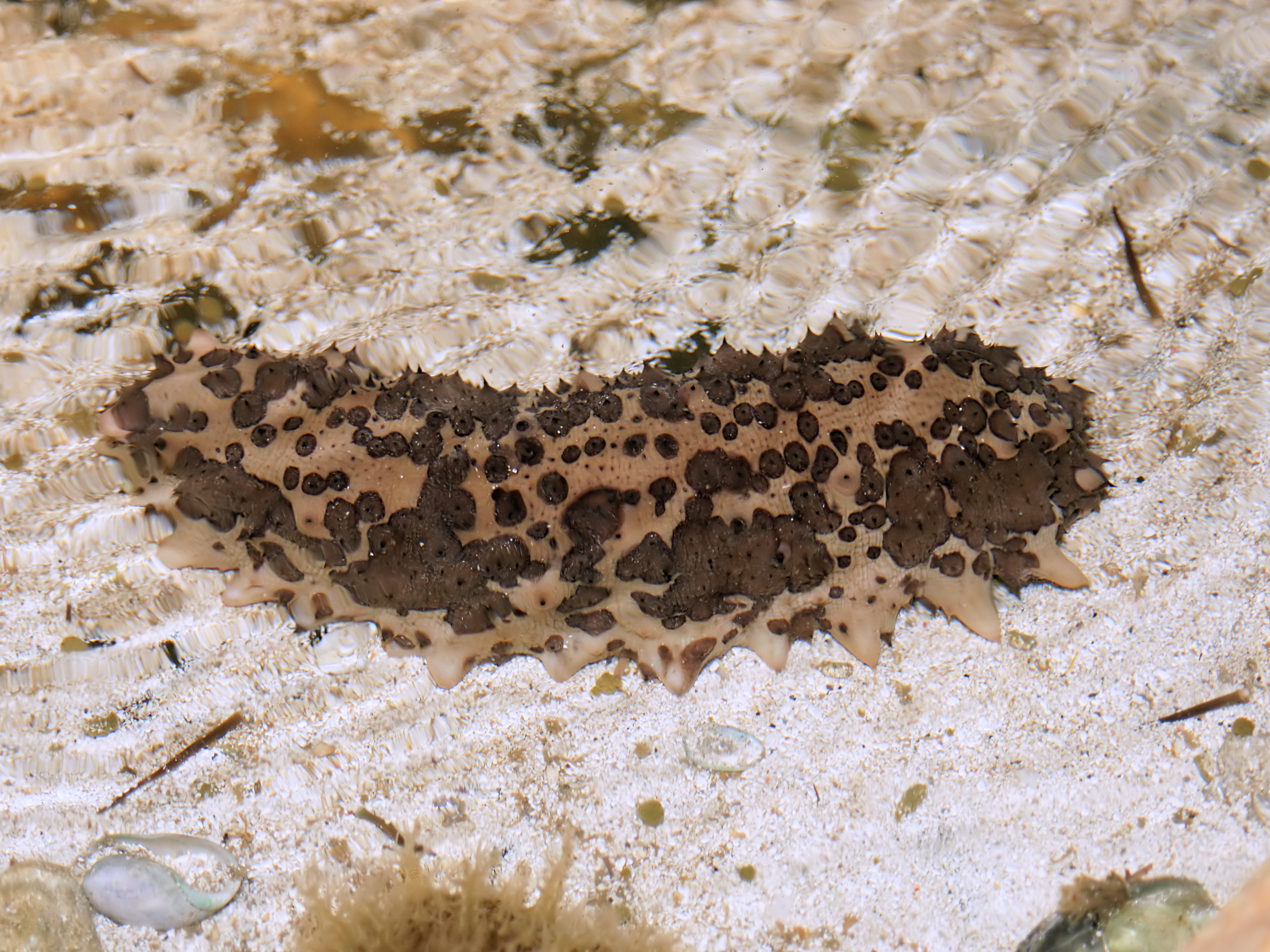

Conservation status
- Endangered (IUCN 3.1)

Scientific classification
- Kingdom: Animalia
- Phylum: Echinodermata
- Class: Holothuroidea
- Order: Synallactida
- Family: Stichopodidae
- Genus: Isostichopus
- Species: I. badionotus

Binomial name
- Isostichopus badionotus (Selenka, 1867)

= Isostichopus badionotus =

Species of sea cucumber

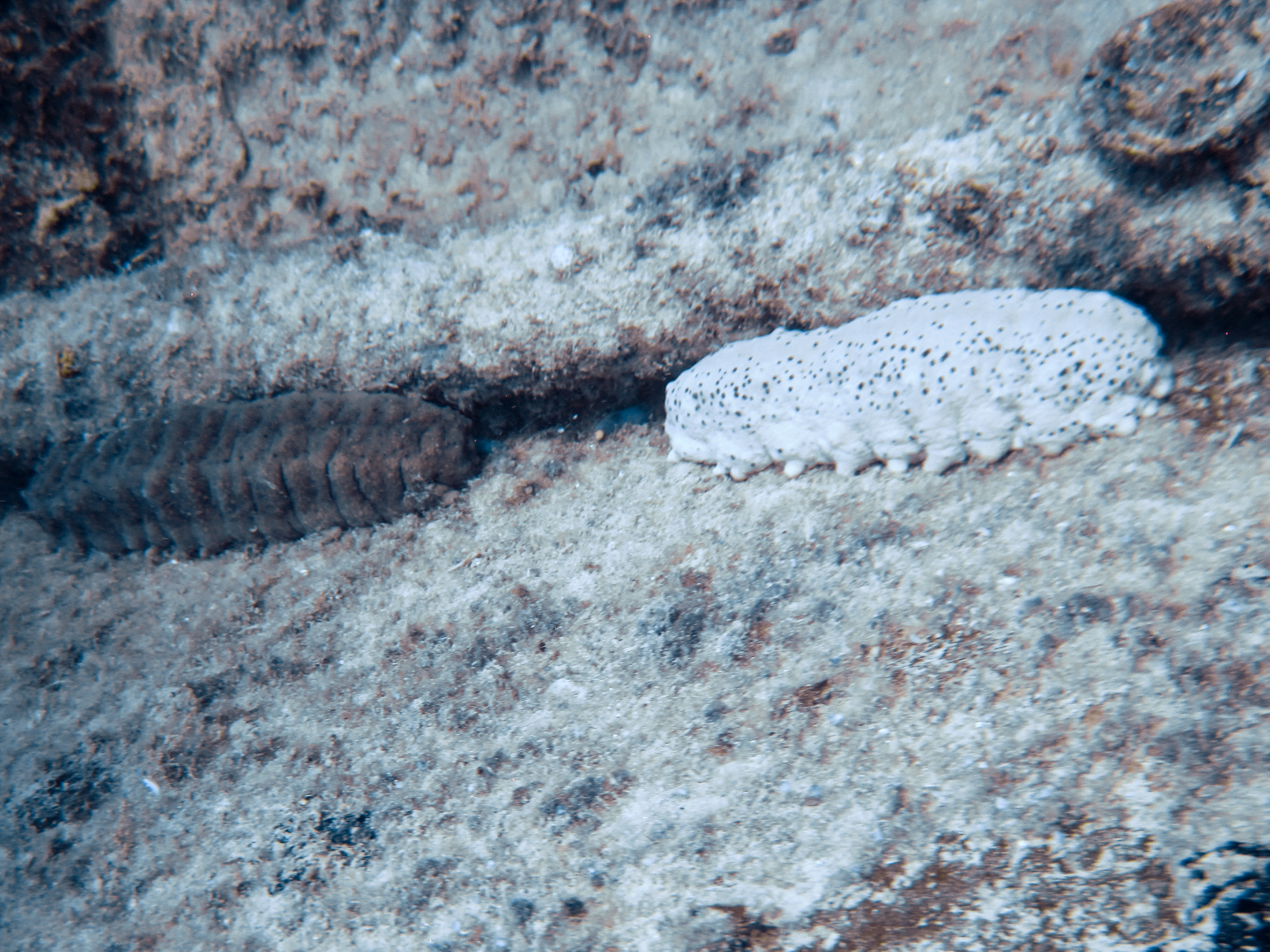
"Chocolate Chip" sea cucumber (Isostichopus badionotus) on the deck of the Eagle artificial reef at approximately 30m depth in the Florida Keys National Marine Sanctuary.

Isostichopus badionotus, also known as the chocolate chip cucumber or the cookie dough sea cucumber, is a species of sea cucumber in the family Stichopodidae. This common species is found in warm parts of the Atlantic Ocean.

== Description ==
This is a large species that can grow to a length of 45 cm (1 ft 6 in), but the average adult size is about 21 cm (8 in). It has distinctive dark coloured "warts" in three coarse rows on its dorsal surface, the rest of the body may vary from white through to shades of orange to brown, with sometimes large brownish stains. The mouth is located ventrally and surrounded by about 20 large tentacles.

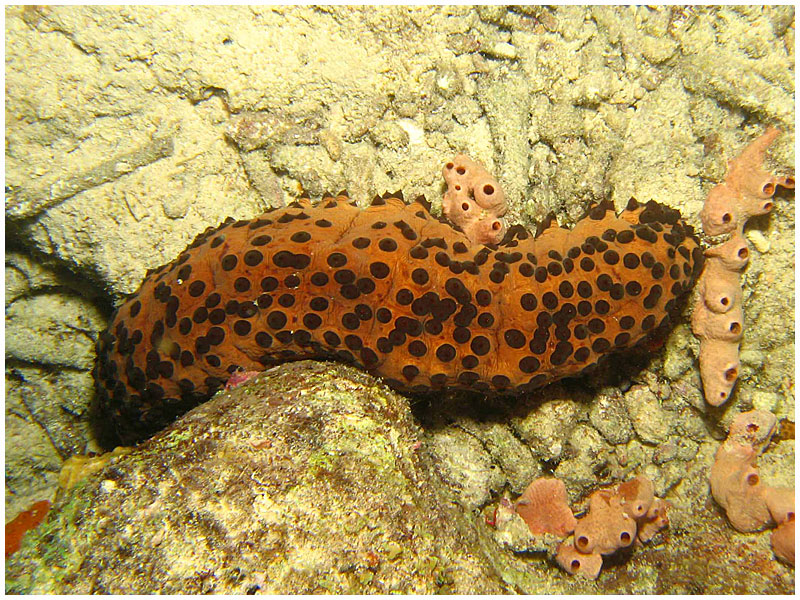

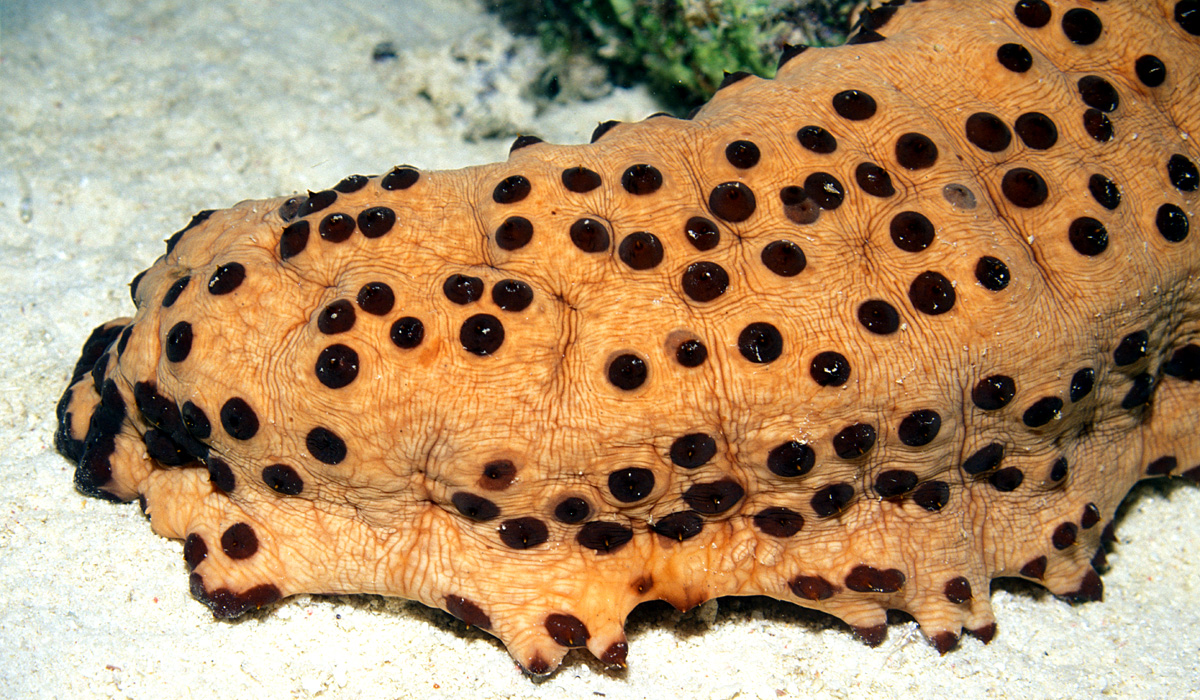

== Habitat and range ==
This species is widespread in the warm Atlantic, where found from North Carolina (USA), through the Caribbean, to north Brazil, at Ascension Island and in the Gulf of Guinea. It is found at depths between 0 and 55 m (0–180 ft).

It inhabits shallow waters, in a wide variety of bottoms (sand, mud, rock, seaweeds...).

== Reproduction ==
Similar to other tropical Holothuroidea, the Isostichopus badiontus is dioecious. Males and females release their gametes into water where fertilization happens externally. A study in the Caribbean Sea observed that the species has an increase in reproductive activity when temperatures increase.

== Conservation status ==
As bottom feeders, Isostichopus badionotus individuals are threatened by contaminated substrates due to metals left behind by boats. Additionally, they are popular in Asian cuisine, and are also threatened by illegal fishing and trafficking.
