= Regions of Brazil =

Brazil is geopolitically divided into five regions (also called macroregions), by the Brazilian Institute of Geography and Statistics, which are formed by the federative units of Brazil. Although officially recognized, the division is merely academic, considering geographic, social and economic factors, among others, and has no political effects other than orientating Federal-level government programs. Under the state level, they are further divided into intermediate regions and even further into immediate regions.

== The five regions ==
Name	Area (km^{2})	Area (%)	Population (2022 census)	Population density (per km^{2})	Population (%)	Most populous municipality	Largest metropolitan area	Number of federative units
Central-West	1,612,007.2	18.86	16.2 million	10.05	8.02	Brasília	Brasília Integrated Development Region	4
Southeast	927,286	10.85	84.8 million	91.44	41.8	São Paulo	São Paulo Metropolitan Area	4
South	577,214	6.75	29.9 million	51.83	14.7	Curitiba	Porto Alegre Metropolitan Area	3
Northeast	1,558,196	18.29	54.6 million	35.04	26.9	Fortaleza	Recife Metropolitan area	9
North	3,689,637.9	45.27	17.3 million	4.69	8.5	Manaus	Manaus Metropolitan Area	7

=== Central-West Region ===

- Area: 1,612,007.2 km^{2} (18.86%)
- Population: 16,289,538 (7.2 people/km^{2}; 6.4%)
- GDP: R$279 billion / US$174,3 billion (2008; 8.3%) (4th)
- Climate: Savanna climate (hot, with little precipitation during winter in the northeast and the east; Tropical in the east and in the west; Equatorial in the north; Some temperate climate places in the south).
- States: Goiás, Mato Grosso, Mato Grosso do Sul, Distrito Federal (Federal District).
- Largest Cities: Brasília (national capital) (2,562,963); Goiânia (1,318,148); Campo Grande (796,252); Cuiabá (556,298); Aparecida de Goiânia (442,978); Anápolis (334,613).
- Economy: Livestock, Soybeans, Maize, Sugarcane, Cotton, Tomato, Nickel, Copper, Gold, tourism.
- Transport: Highways where they are present (mostly in the center and east regions); transport by rivers is common in the north and in the east; airplanes are used in remote and smaller communities.
- Vegetation: Mainly savanna-like vegetation, including the Pantanal (Chaco, in Paraguay), flooded areas in the west, equatorial rainforests in the north.
- Notable characteristics: With a low population density, most of the land in the region is used for grazing instead of agriculture. The region is also the least industrialized in the country, based mainly in food & meat processing.

=== Southeast Region ===

- Area: 927,286 km^{2} (10.85%)
- Population: 84,840,113 (77.96 people/km^{2}, 38%)
- GDP: R$1,629 trillion / US$803 billion (2008; ~49%) (1st)
- Climate: Tropical in the northwest (warm, relatively dry in the winter and wet in the summer); Semi-arid in the north; temperate in the south
- States: Espírito Santo, Minas Gerais, Rio de Janeiro, São Paulo
- Largest cities: São Paulo (11,037,593); Rio de Janeiro (6,186,710); Belo Horizonte (2,452,617); Guarulhos (1,299,283); Campinas (1,064,669); São Gonçalo (991,382); Duque de Caxias (872,762); Nova Iguaçu (865,089); São Bernardo do Campo (810,979); Osasco (718,646); Santo André (673,396); Uberlândia (634,345); Contagem (625,393); São José dos Campos (615,871); Sorocaba (584,313); Ribeirão Preto (563,107); Juiz de Fora (526,706); Belford Roxo (501,544); Niterói (479,384); São João de Meriti (469,827); Betim (441,748); Campos dos Goytacazes (434,008).
- Economy: Manufacturing (machinery, electronics, automobiles and aviation, steel, chemicals, shoes, textiles), coffee, sugar cane, orange juice, livestock, tourism, petroleum, iron, gold, energy production (not sufficient, however, to fulfill its demand). The Southeast is the economic center of Brazil, and most large companies present in Brazil have their headquarters in this region. The economic success of this region is a combination of its 4 states. São Paulo state is the most developed in the country, it has a population density as high as western Europe, and a HDI comparable to eastern Europe. Rio de Janeiro is the leader in petroleum production (with almost 3/4 of national production) . Minas Gerais and Espírito Santo are located in the richest mining region in Brazil.
- Transport: The region is heavily covered by highways, and, to some extent, railways. Railways and rivers are used mainly for freight, and used where they are present. The region also contains several airport hubs which provide many domestic and international air routes.
- Vegetation: Mainly tropical-like semi-deciduous forests (Mata Atlântica); semi-arid in the north, with almost no vegetation; savannah-like vegetation in the west and in the northwest (Cerrado). Very little of the native vegetation still remains (~2%, mostly in parks.)
- Notable characteristics: The southeast region is the major powerhouse of the Brazilian economy, responsible for 49% of the Brazilian GDP (approximately US$1024 billion in 2010). It is also the most populous region in the country, with more than 80 million people, and contains the three most important metropolitan regions (São Paulo, Rio de Janeiro and Belo Horizonte), as well as many other large cities (such as, Vitória (the capital of Espírito Santo state), Campinas, Uberlândia and several others.)

=== South Region ===

- Area: 577,214 km^{2} (6.75%)
- Population: 29,937,706 (43.46 people/km^{2}, 12.5%)
- GDP: R$503 billion / US$313,8 billion (2008; ~15%) (2nd)
- Climate: Subtropical by the coast, hot to moderately hot in the summer, mild and very humid winters and temperate by the mountain range, the valleys and the plateaus in the interior, with moderate temperatures in the summer and cold in the winter, with well distributed rainfalls. Snow is relatively common, mainly in the highlands (for example in Santa Catarina state's São Joaquim).
- States: Paraná, Rio Grande do Sul, Santa Catarina
- Largest Cities: Curitiba (1,764,540); Porto Alegre (1,413,094); Joinville (520,905); Londrina (511,278); Caxias do Sul (441,332); Florianópolis (427,298); Maringá (362,329); Pelotas (328,864); Canoas (325,188); Ponta Grossa (314,527); Blumenau (312,634); Cascavel (289,339); Foz do Iguaçu (255,900); and Santa Maria (262,368).
- Economy: Machinery and automobile industries, textiles, shoes, information technologytourism, soy, maize, wheat, tobacco, rice, apple, wine,livestock, coal, energy production.
- Transport: There are many developed highways and railways throughout the region, although the latter is mainly used for freight. Rivers are used when possible.
- Vegetation: Rainforests along the coast (Mata Atlântica), subtropical semiciduous in the north and west (Araucárias) and prairie-like vegetation in the south (Pampas). Little native vegetation still remains due to deforestation.
- Notable characteristics: The South Region of Brazil is historically characterized by its high standard of living, with considerably better social indicators, which include some of the cities with the highest HDI levels in the country, including their capitals. Cities also feature an advanced level of urbanism in comparison with other parts of Brazil. The region is almost the newest in terms of urbanization, it was recently populated by European immigrants (almost 19th century immigration and refugees of World War I and World War IIs). They have added to the local culture, especially in architecture, cuisine and forms of agriculture. Southern region, however, is not immune from poverty, violence and other social issues, especially in the larger cities, even though in a lower level than poorer areas in the country. The state of Santa Catarina is proportionally the Whitest state in Brazil with over 87% of its population being European. The other southern states also have the highest percentage rates of European population.

=== Northeast Region ===

- Area: 1,561,177 km^{2} (18.3%)
- Population: 54,658,515 (30.55 people/km^{2}; 29%; 2009)
- GDP: R$437 billion / US$273,1 billion (2009; ~12%) (3rd)
- Climate: Hot all year long. Tropical near the coast and semi-arid in the interior; semi-equatorial in the far west of the region.
- States: Alagoas, Bahia, Ceará, Maranhão, Paraíba, Pernambuco, Piauí, Rio Grande do Norte, Sergipe
- Largest cities: Salvador (2,676,606); Fortaleza (2,447,409); Recife (1,536,934); São Luís (1,011,943); Maceió (932,608); Natal (789,836); Teresina (714,583); João Pessoa (595,429); Jaboatão dos Guararapes; (580,795); Feira de Santana (481,137); Aracaju (461,083); Olinda (368,666); Campina Grande (354,546).
- Economy: Tourism, tropical fruits (coconut, papaya, melon, banana, mango, pineapple), cocoa, cashew nuts, soybeans, cotton, sugarcane, machinery manufacturing, textiles,wind energy production, salt extraction.
- Transport: Mainly highways, which are more abundant along the coast, although transport by sea is also important.
- Vegetation: Mainly desert-like vegetation, with tropical forests along the coast and in the west and savanna-like vegetation in the southwest.
- Notable characteristics: This region was the first part of Brazil discovered by the Portuguese, and the first Brazilian capital, Salvador, was founded here. It has the lowest levels in the country in almost all of the social indicators, being considered the most impoverished region in Brazil. However, it has been growing above national average since the start of the 21st century, gradually reducing the socio-economic distance to the other regions.

=== North Region ===

- Area: 3,689,637.9 km^{2} (45.27%)
- Population: 17,354,884 (4.5 people/km^{2}; 6.2%; 2016)
- GDP: R$ 308 billion / US$94,8 billion (2016; 4.7%) (5th)
- Climate: Equatorial
- States: Acre, Amapá, Amazonas, Pará, Rondônia, Roraima, Tocantins
- Largest Cities: Manaus (2,063,689); Belém (1,303,403); Ananindeua (478,778); Porto Velho (460,434); Macapá (442,933); Boa Vista (413,486); Rio Branco (364,756); Santarém (331,937); Palmas (302,692).
- Economy: Iron, Copper, Gold, Bauxite, Manganese, Açaí, Pineapple, Energy production, electronic manufacturing, tourism.
- Transport: Mainly rivers (which are abundant in the region). Highways are scarce and present mainly in the east. Airplanes are commonly used in small remote communities and sometimes in the larger cities.
- Vegetation: Almost the entire region is covered by Amazon rainforest, except the state of Tocantins, which has savanna-like vegetation (cerrado). Most of the native vegetation still remains.
- Notable characteristics: Presence of the Amazon Rainforest, which is the vegetation dominant in every state but Tocantins. Cities are spread far apart in the region, and it has the lowest population density of the country. There are very few paved highways in the region, as it is almost isolated from the rest of the country. It is also the biggest region of Brazil, being responsible for almost half of the Brazilian territorial extension. Economic growth is above national average (especially in Amazonas and in Tocantins).

== Ethnic composition of regions ==
The composition of regions of Brazil according to autosomal genetic studies focused on the Brazilian population (which has been found to be a complex melting pot of European, African and Native Americans components):

A 2011 autosomal DNA study, with nearly 1000 samples from all over the country ("whites", "pardos" and "blacks"), found a major European contribution, followed by a high African contribution and an important Native American component. The study showed that Brazilians from different regions are more homogeneous than previously thought by some based on the census alone. "Brazilian homogeneity is, therefore, a lot greater between Brazilian regions than within Brazilian regions."

Region	European	African	Native American
Southeast Brazil	74.20%	17.30%	7.30%
Southern Brazil	79.50%	10.30%	9.40%
Northeast Brazil	60.10%	29.30%	8.90%
Northern Brazil	68.80%	10.50%	18.50%

According to an autosomal DNA study from 2010, a new portrayal of each ethnicity contribution to the DNA of Brazilians, obtained with samples from the five regions of the country, has indicated that, on average, European ancestors are responsible for nearly 80% of the genetic heritage of the population. The variation between the regions is small, with the possible exception of the South, where the European contribution reaches nearly 90%. The results, published by the scientific American Journal of Human Biology by a team of the Catholic University of Brasília, show that, in Brazil, physical indicators such as colour of skin, eyes and hair have little to do with the genetic ancestry of each person, which has been shown in previous studies (regardless of census classification). Ancestry informative SNPs can be useful to estimate individual and population biogeographical ancestry. Brazilian population is characterized by a genetic background of three parental populations (European, African, and Brazilian Native Amerindians) with a wide degree and diverse patterns of admixture. In this work we analyzed the information content of 28 ancestry-informative SNPs into multiplexed panels using three parental population sources (African, Amerindian, and European) to infer the genetic admixture in an urban sample of the five Brazilian geopolitical regions. The SNPs assigned apart the parental populations from each other and thus can be applied for ancestry estimation in a three hybrid admixed population. Data was used to infer genetic ancestry in Brazilians with an admixture model. Pairwise estimates of F(st) among the five Brazilian geopolitical regions suggested little genetic differentiation only between the South and the remaining regions. Estimates of ancestry results are consistent with the heterogeneous genetic profile of Brazilian population, with a major contribution of European ancestry (0.771) followed by African (0.143) and Amerindian contributions (0.085). The described multiplexed SNP panels can be useful tool for bioanthropological studies but it can be mainly valuable to control for spurious results in genetic association studies in admixed populations."

Region	European	African	Native American
Central-West Brazil	65.90%	18.70%	11.80%
Southeast Brazil	79.90%	14.10%	6.10%
South Brazil	87.70%	7.70%	5.20%
Northeast Brazil	77.40%	13.60%	8.90%
North Brazil	71.10%	18.20%	10.70%

An autosomal DNA study from 2009 found a similar profile "all the Brazilian samples (regions) lie more closely to the European group than to the African populations or to the Mestizos from Mexico."

Region	European	African	Native American
Central-West Brazil	66.3%	21.7%	12.0%
Southeast Brazil	60.7%	32.0%	7.3%
South Brazil	81.5%	9.3%	9.2%
Northeast Brazil	66.7%	23.3%	10.0%
North Brazil	60.6%	21.3%	18.1%

According to another autosomal DNA study from 2008, by the University of Brasília (UnB), European ancestry dominates in the whole of Brazil (in all regions), accounting for 65.90% of heritage of the population, followed by the African contribution (24.80%) and the Native American (9.3%); the European ancestry being the dominant ancestry in all regions including the Northeast of Brazil.

A study from 1965, "Methods of Analysis of a Hybrid Population" (Human Biology, vol 37, number 1), led by geneticists D. F. Roberts and R. W. Hiorns, found out the average Northeastern Brazilian to be predominantly European in ancestry (65%), with minor but important African and Native American contributions (25% and 9%).

== See also ==
- Biomes in Brazil
- Brazil socio-geographic division
- Demographics of Brazil

== Notes ==
- The number given in parentheses are percentages relative to Brazil as a whole.
- The populations for the cities given do not include their metropolitan areas.
