= Animal husbandry in Brazil =

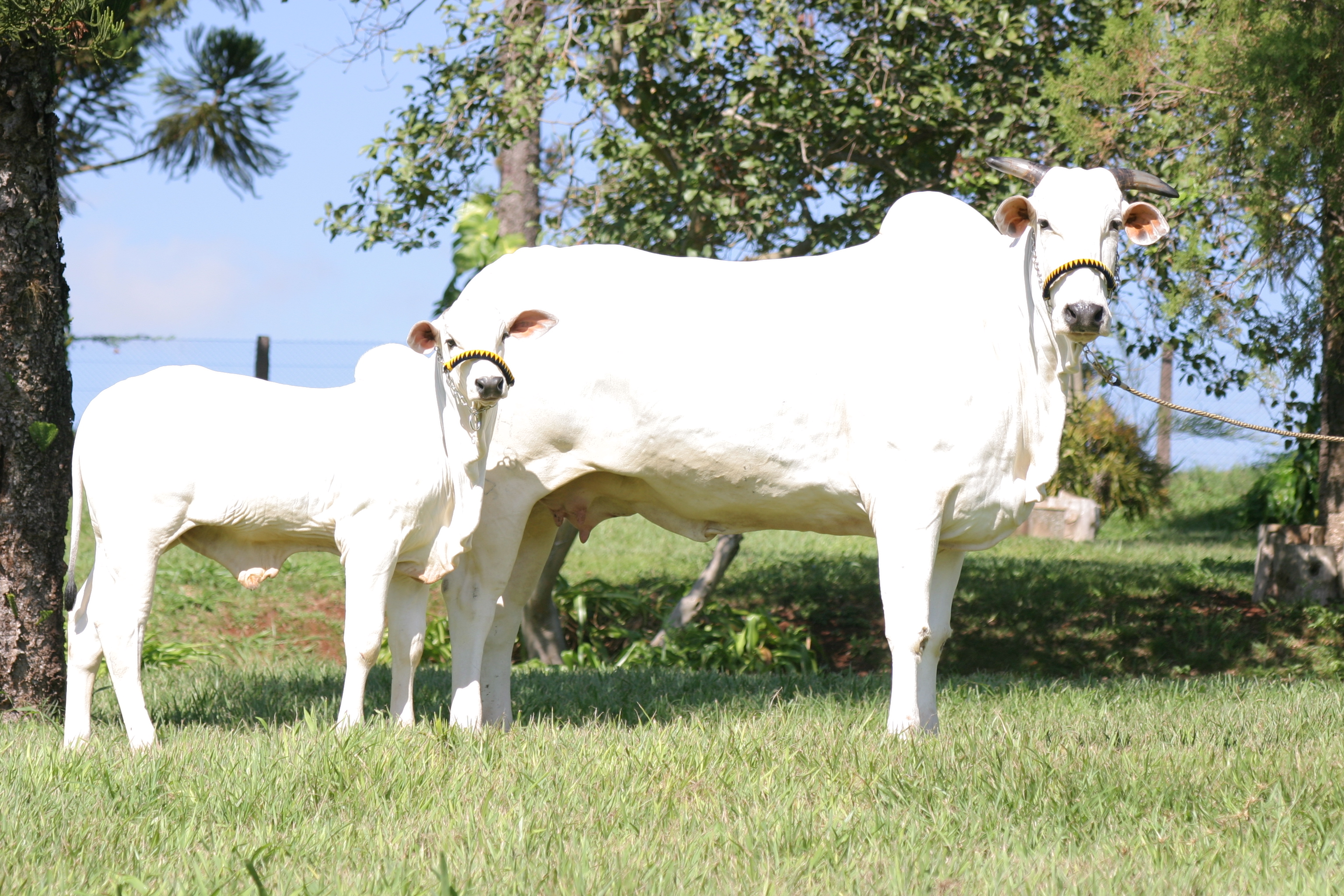
Nelore cattle in Brazil

Animal husbandry has been a significant part of Brazil's economy since the colonial period. In 2023, Brazil had a herd of 238.62 million head of cattle. The average stocking rate in the country was 1.25 head/ha (unit of head per hectare) in 2016. The country is the largest exporter of beef in the world: 3.01 million tonnes in 2023. It is also the world's largest exporter of chicken meat: 5.09 million tonnes in 2025. The fifth largest milk producer, with a total production of 36.74 million liters in 2023. And the 3rd largest producer of pork in the world at 5.3 million tonnes in 2023.

In 2017, the flocks in Brazil were of the following order: 1,425,699,944 birds, with 242,767,457 chicken and 15,473,981 quail; 214,899,796 cattle, 41,099,460 pigs, 17,976,367 sheep, 9,592,079 goats and 1,381,395 buffaloes, in addition to 5,501,872 equine.

== Cattle ==
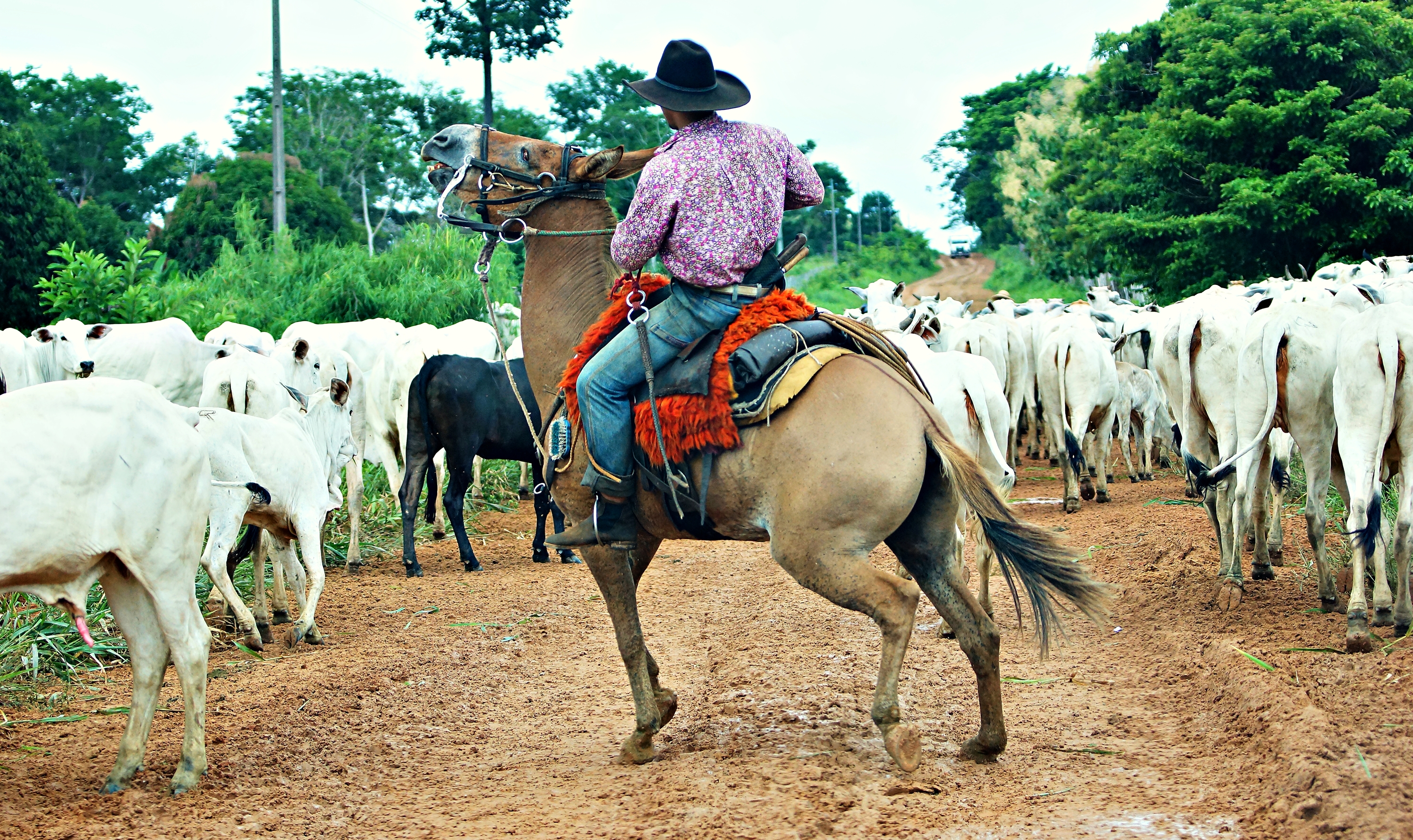
Cattle in Mato Grosso

Brazil is the holder of the second largest herd of cattle in the world, 22.2% of the world herd, behind only India, which does not produce them for consumption. The country was also the second largest producer of beef, responsible for 15.4% of global production. The United States (the world's largest producer), Brazil and the European Union, together, accounted for almost half of all meat produced in the world in 2016. In 2016 Brazilian beef exports in natura totaled 1.08 million tons with a value of R $4.35 billion.

The Brazilian cattle herd had 218.23 million head in 2016. The main cattle ranching center in Brazil is the state of Mato Grosso, the largest cattle herd in Brazil. In 2016, the Central-West Region had 34.4% of the national total. The North Region registered 47.98 million head of cattle, the second largest in the country. Mato Grosso was the state with the largest cattle herd, housing 13.9% of the Brazilian total. At the time, the state had 30.30 million head of cattle. Minas Gerais, Goiás and Mato Grosso do Sul contributed 10.8%, 10.5% and 10.0% of the national staff, respectively. At the municipal level, the largest numbers were located in São Félix do Xingu (PA), Corumbá (MS), Ribas do Rio Pardo (MS), Cáceres (MT) and Marabá (PA). Among the 20 municipalities with the largest herd, 13 were located in the Midwest, six in the North, and one in the South of the country.

Brazil in 2018 was the 3rd largest world producer of milk, behind only the United States and India. This year, the country produced 35.1 billion liters.

The South region holds the first place in the ranking in Brazilian milk production. The South has 35.7%, competing with the Southeast (which was the largest producer until 2014), which has 34.2%. The Southeast has the largest herd of milked cows: 30.4% of the total of 17.1 million existing in Brazil. The highest productivity, however, is that of the South Region, with an average of 3,284 liters per cow per year, which is why it leads the ranking of milk production since 2015. The municipality of Castro, in Paraná, was the largest producer in 2017, with 264 million liters of milk. Paraná is already the second largest national producer with 4.7 billion liters, second only to Minas Gerais. Minas Gerais is the main milk producing state in Brazil, with the largest number of milked cows, responsible for 26.6% of production and 20.0% of total milking animals. The municipality of Patos de Minas was the 2nd largest producer in 2017, with 191.3 million liters of milk. In 2015, the state produced 9.1 billion liters of milk.

== Pigs ==
In 2019, Brazil was the 4th largest pork producer in the world, with almost 4 million tons, after China, the European Union and the United States.

For pork, the three southern states are the largest producers in the country. Brazil had 41.1 million head in 2017. Santa Catarina is the largest producer in Brazil, with 19.7% of the Brazilian total. The state is responsible for 28.38% of the country's slaughter and for 40.28% of Brazilian pork exports. Paraná (17.2%) and Rio Grande do Sul (14.6%) are the 2nd and 3rd largest producers. Toledo (PR), Rio Verde (GO) and Uberlândia (MG) are the cities with the highest numbers of pigs.

== Poultry ==
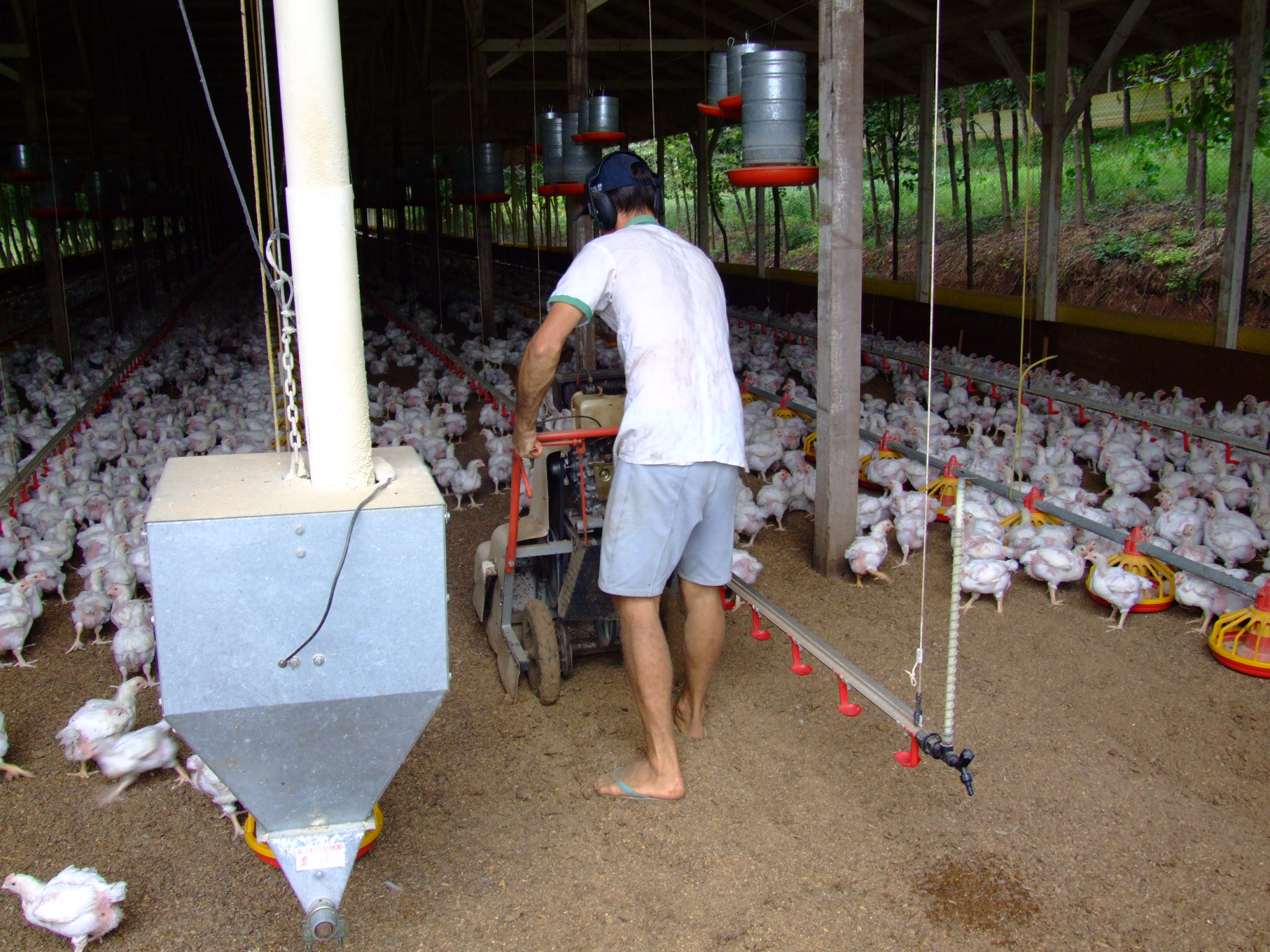
Poultry in Campos Novos

Brazil is the world's largest exporter of chicken meat: 3.77 million tons in 2019.

The Brazilian poultry flock, in 2018, was of the order of 1.5 billion heads. Poultry flocks, according to IBGE, include chickens, roosters, hens and chicks. In 2018, the South region, with emphasis on the creation of broilers, was responsible for almost half of the Brazilian total (46.9%). Paraná alone accounted for 26.2%. The situation is reversed, however, when it comes to chickens. The first region in the ranking was the Southeast, with 38.9% of the country's total head. A total of 246.9 million hens were estimated for 2018. The state of São Paulo was responsible for 21.9%. Santa Maria de Jetibá (ES) was the municipality that had the largest numbers of both poultry and hens. For the ranking of chickens came Cascavel (PR), Bastos (SP), Rio Verde (GO) and Uberlândia (MG). The ranking of municipalities for chickens is completed by Bastos (SP), Primavera do Leste (MT), São Bento do Una (PE) and Itanhandu (MG). In 2017, the main poultry producing states were Paraná (25.3%), São Paulo (14.0%), Rio Grande do Sul (11.0%), Santa Catarina (10.8%). In terms of chickens, in 2017 there were 242.8 million heads: Southeast (38.7%) and South (26.0%), the largest producers. Among the states, São Paulo led with 21.9%, followed by Paraná (10.1%), Rio Grande do Sul (8.8%), Minas Gerais (8.7%) and Espírito Santo (7.9%).

In 2016, Brazil was the seventh largest egg producer in the world.

Brazilian production of chicken eggs was 4.4 billion dozens in 2018, generating an income of R $14.0 billion. The Southeast Region had 43.8% of this total. The South comes in 2nd place, with approximately 24% of production. The state of São Paulo was the largest national producer (25.6%). Paraná comes in 2nd place with approximately 10%. Among the municipalities, the largest producers are the cities of Santa Maria de Jetibá (ES), Bastos (SP) and Primavera do Leste (MT).

In 2018, the Brazilian population of quails was 16.8 million birds. The Southeast is responsible for 64%. São Paulo (24.6%) and Espírito Santo (21.0%) are the largest producers. In the municipal ranking, Santa Maria de Jetibá (ES) occupies the first position both in the quantity of animals and in the production of eggs. Bastos (SP) was in second position.

== Goats and sheep ==
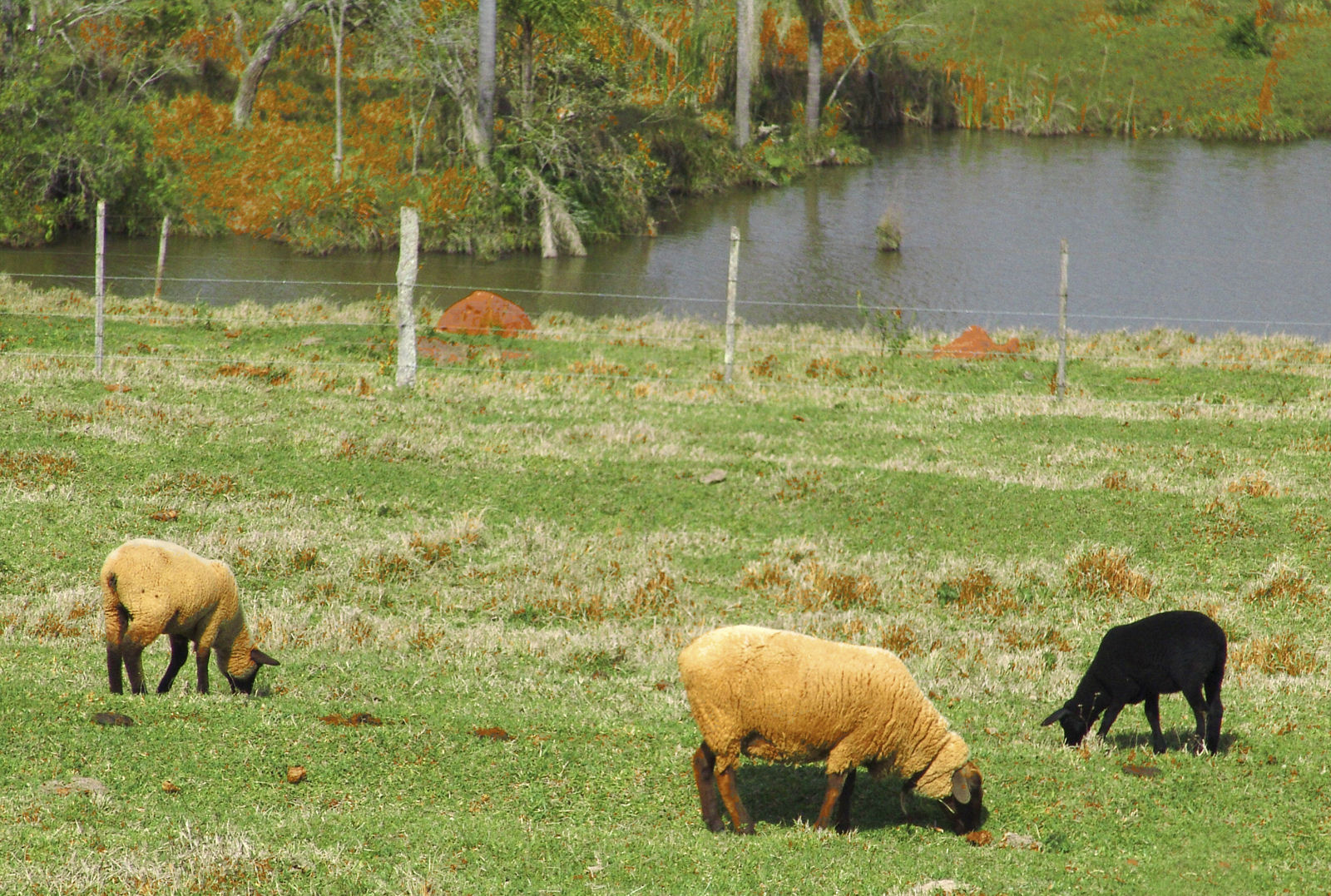
Sheep in Southern Brazil

The Northeast Region housed 93.2% of the goat herd (8,944,461 heads) and 64.2% of the sheep herd (11,544,939 heads) in 2017. Bahia concentrated 30.9% of the goat herd and 20,9% of the national sheep herd. Casa Nova (BA) took first place in the municipal ranking with the largest numbers of both species. The South region was the 2nd largest in the country in the herd of sheep, with 4.2 million heads. Sheep shearing activity remained predominant in the South, which is responsible for 99% of wool production in the country. Rio Grande do Sul continued to be the state with the largest national participation, representing 94.1% of the total. The municipalities of Santana do Livramento, Alegrete and Quaraí led the activity. Currently, meat production has become the main objective of sheep farming in Rio Grande do Sul, due to the increase in prices paid to the producer that made the activity more attractive and profitable. There, sheep breeds more adapted to the subtropical climate are used.

In 2016, Brazil had a goat herd of almost 9.8 million heads. The country has the 21st largest herd in the world. However, the Brazilian herd is mostly found in an area with unfavorable climatic conditions (in the semi-arid region of the Northeast), and goat farming is rarely seen as a business activity and is often considered a marginal activity, used only for survival, not on a commercial scale.

== Pisciculture ==
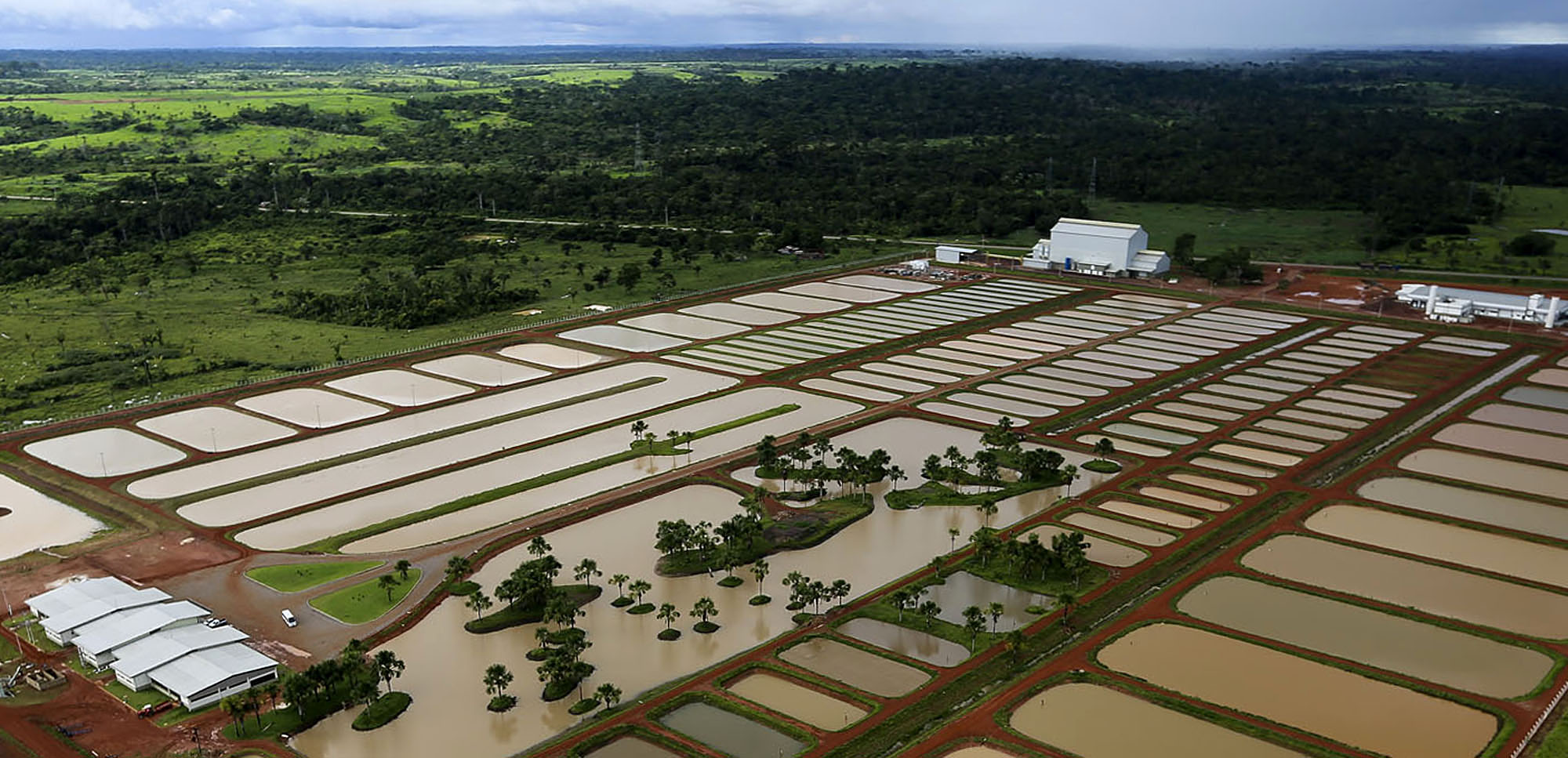
Fish farming in Acre

In fish farming, western Paraná, in municipalities close to Toledo and Cascavel, became the largest fish producing region in the country, with tilapia as the main cultivated species. The west represents 69% of all production in Paraná, the largest national producer, with 112 thousand tons. Of this amount, 91% refer to tilapia breeding.

The country's fish production totaled 485.2 thousand tons in 2017. Paraná (20.2%), São Paulo (9.8%) and Rondônia (8.2%) had the largest participation. The city of Nova Aurora led the national production. Tilapia, with 283.2 thousand tons, represented 58.4% of fish farming. Tambaqui, with 18.2%, is the second most created species. The North Region is the largest producer of tambaqui.

The production of shrimp in Brazil was 41.0 thousand tons in 2017. Rio Grande do Norte (37.7%) and Ceará (28.9%) were the largest producers. Aracati, in Ceará, was the city with the largest participation.

The production of oysters, scallops and mussels was 20.9 thousand tons in 2017. Santa Catarina has 98.1% of the national production. Palhoça, Florianópolis and Bombinhas were the municipalities with the highest production.

== Honey ==
In 2017, Brazil was the 11th largest producer of honey in the world, with less than 4.0% of global exports of the product. 41.6 thousand tons were produced, 16.5 thousand tons in the South Region.

The South region was the main honey producer in the country in 2017, accounting for 39.7% of the national total. Rio Grande do Sul was the 1st with 15.2%, Paraná in 2nd with 14.3%, Santa Catarina in 5th with 10.2%.

== Buffaloes ==
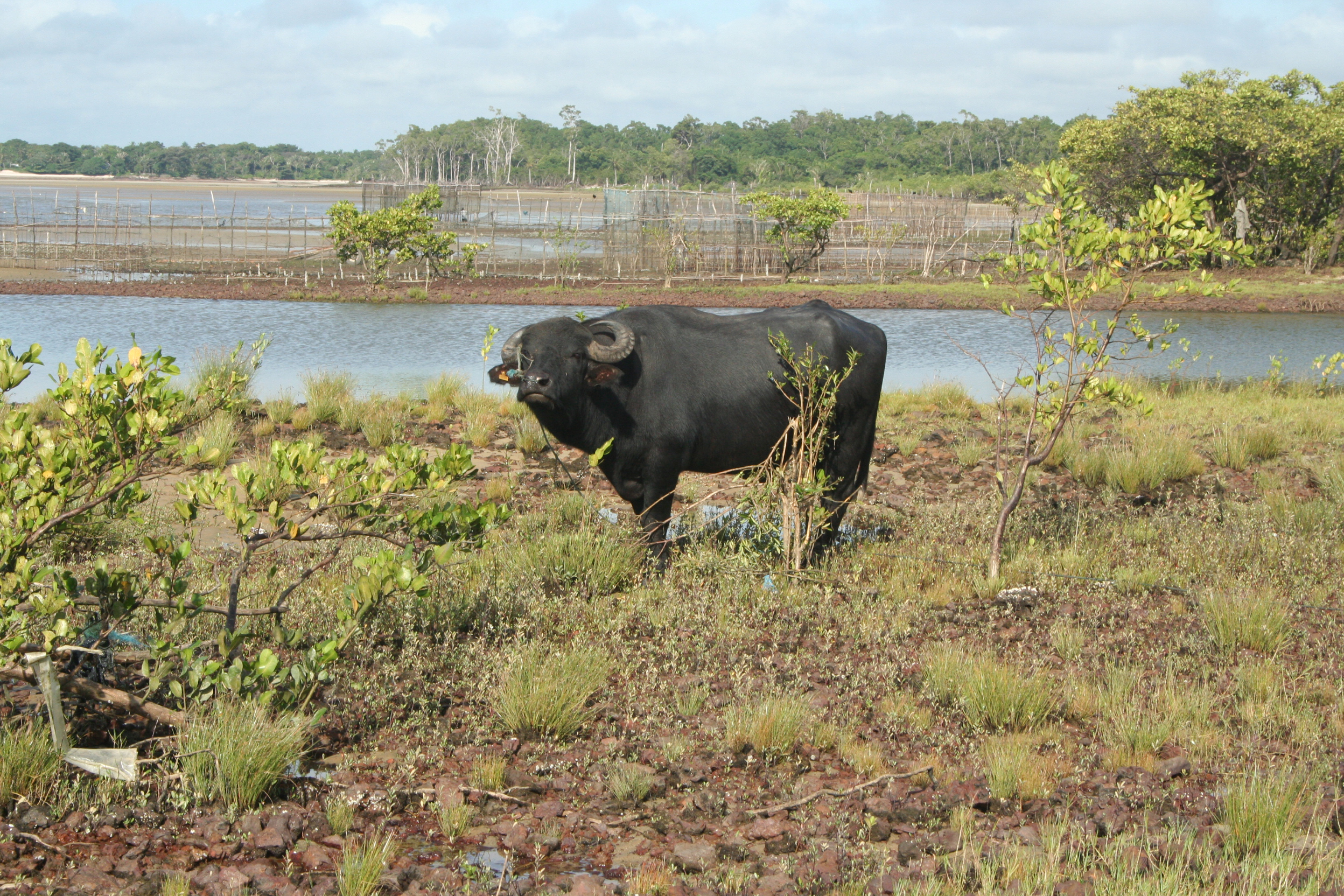
Buffaloes on Marajó island

In 2016, the Brazilian herd of buffaloes was 1.37 million head. The North Region concentrated 66.2% of buffalo farming, while the remainder was distributed between the Southeast (12.7%), Northeast (9.5%), South (7.4%) and Central-West (4,4%). Pará was responsible for 37.9%, followed by Amapá (21.6%), representing together 89.9% of the herd in the North Region and 59.5% of the national herd. Of the ten municipalities with the largest numbers, six are in Pará and four in Amapá. In municipal terms, the first position was with the Municipality of Chaves (PA), with 160.85 thousand animals, followed by Cutias (AP) and Soure (PA). In Minas Gerais, there has been an increase in the production of buffaloes for meat and dairy production, mainly mozzarella made with buffalo milk.

== Raniculture ==
In 2016, Brazil was considered the 2nd largest frog breeder in the world, second only to Taiwan. However, it is small-scale, without even precise data about the quantity produced: the last official survey cited 160 tons per year, but some say that this number is three times higher. Because the price of a kilo of frog meat is high, consumption is reduced and reserved for a very few people. Frog meat is easy to digest, has high nutritional value, low fat content and low cholesterol, and also is considered a gastronomic delicacy. Some nutritionists consider frog meat to be the best protein available for consumption.

== Duck ==
In Brazil, duck meat production is concentrated in Santa Catarina. It is low-volume, aimed at a niche market. In 2015 the country exported US$7,637 million of this meat, mainly to Saudi Arabia, United Arab Emirates and Japan. At the time, the largest company in the region specializing in this meat slaughtered about 10,000 ducks a day.

== See also ==
- Agriculture in Brazil
- Economy of Brazil
