= Governador Celso Ramos =

- Municipality
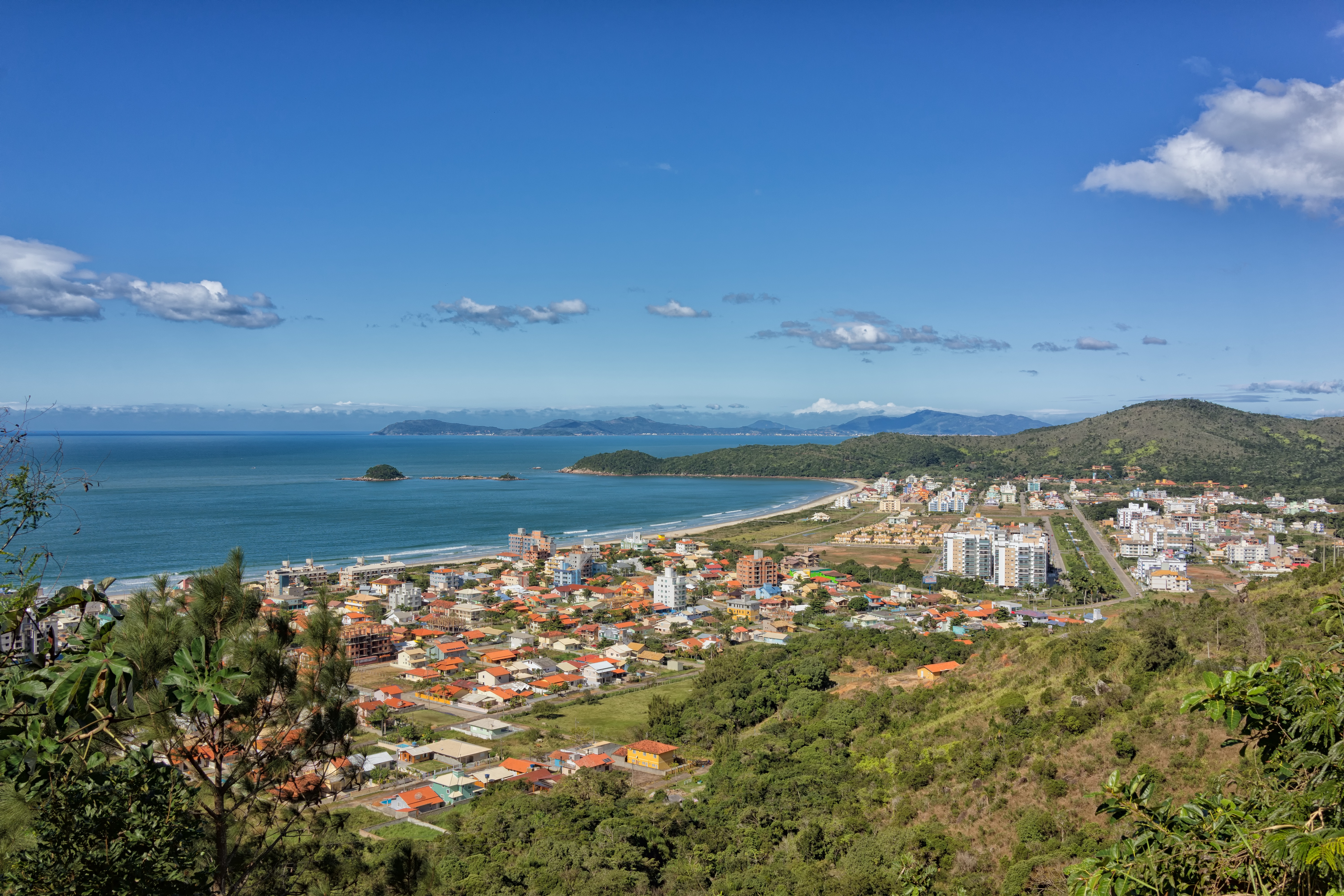

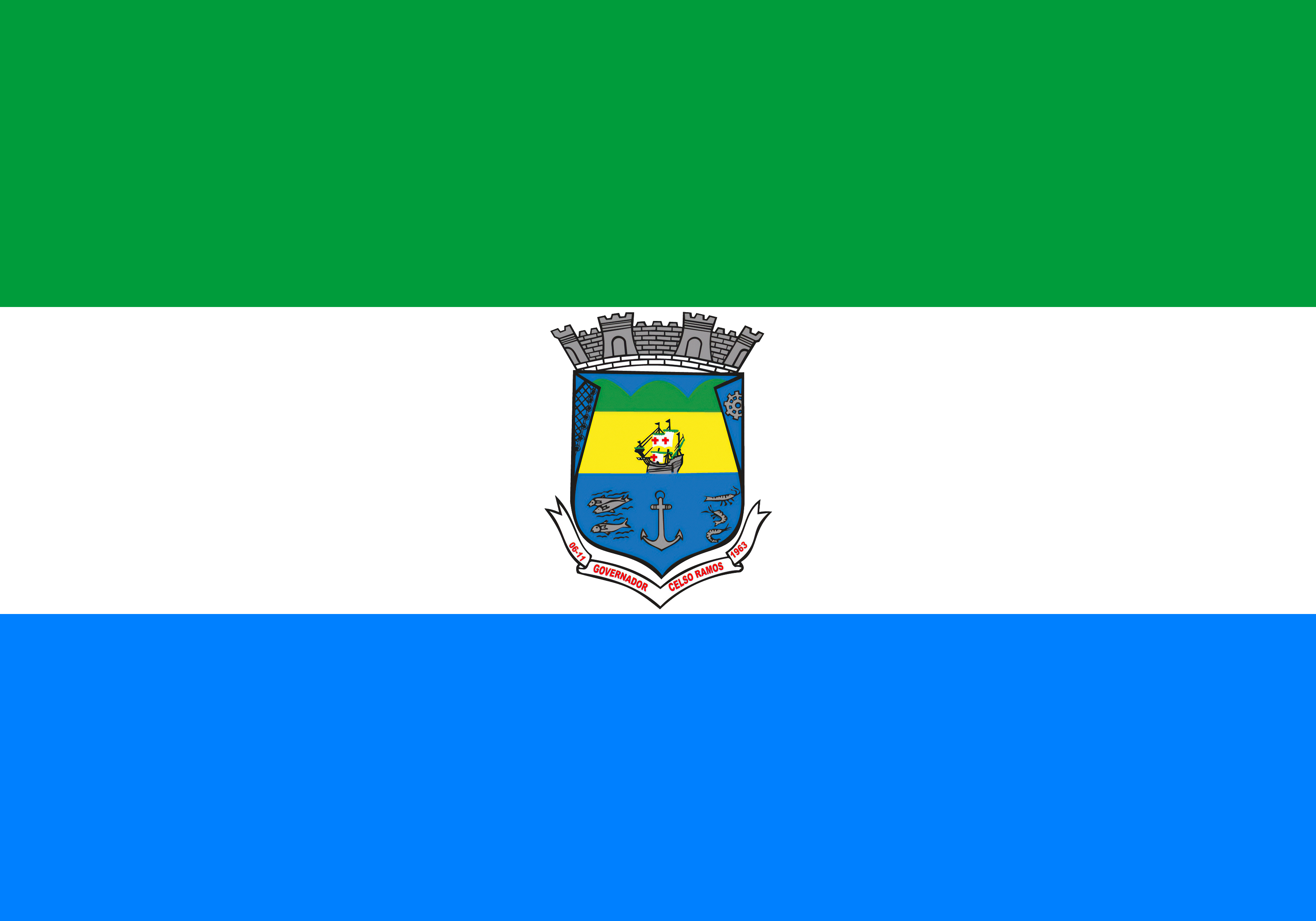
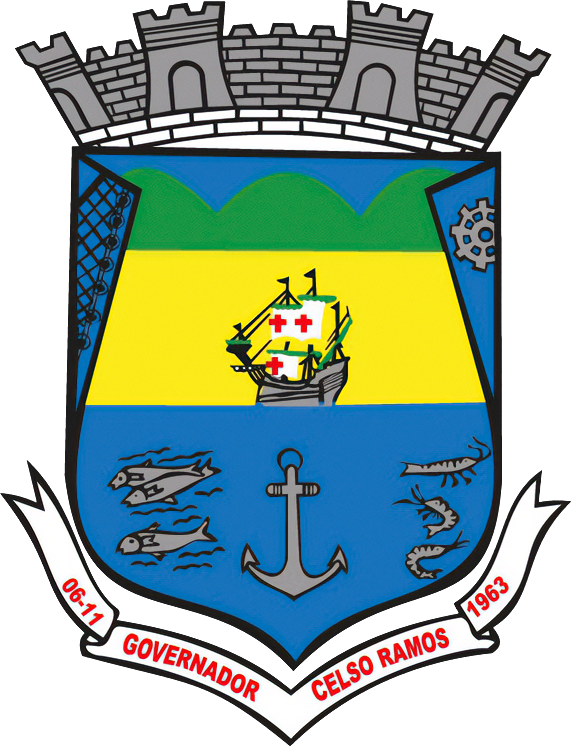
- Flag Coat of arms

- Location in Brazil
- Coordinates: 27.315°S 48.5589°W
- Country: Brazil
- Region: South
- State: Santa Catarina
- Mesoregion: Grande Florianópolis

Population (2020)
  - Total: 14,606
- Time zone: UTC−3 (BRT)
- Website: governadorcelsoramos.sc.gov.br

Governador Celso Ramos is a municipality in the state of Santa Catarina in the South region of Brazil.

The municipality contains part of the 17,104-hectare (42,260-acre) offshore Marinha do Arvoredo Biological Reserve, a fully protected conservation unit established in 1990.

== See also ==
- List of municipalities in Santa Catarina
