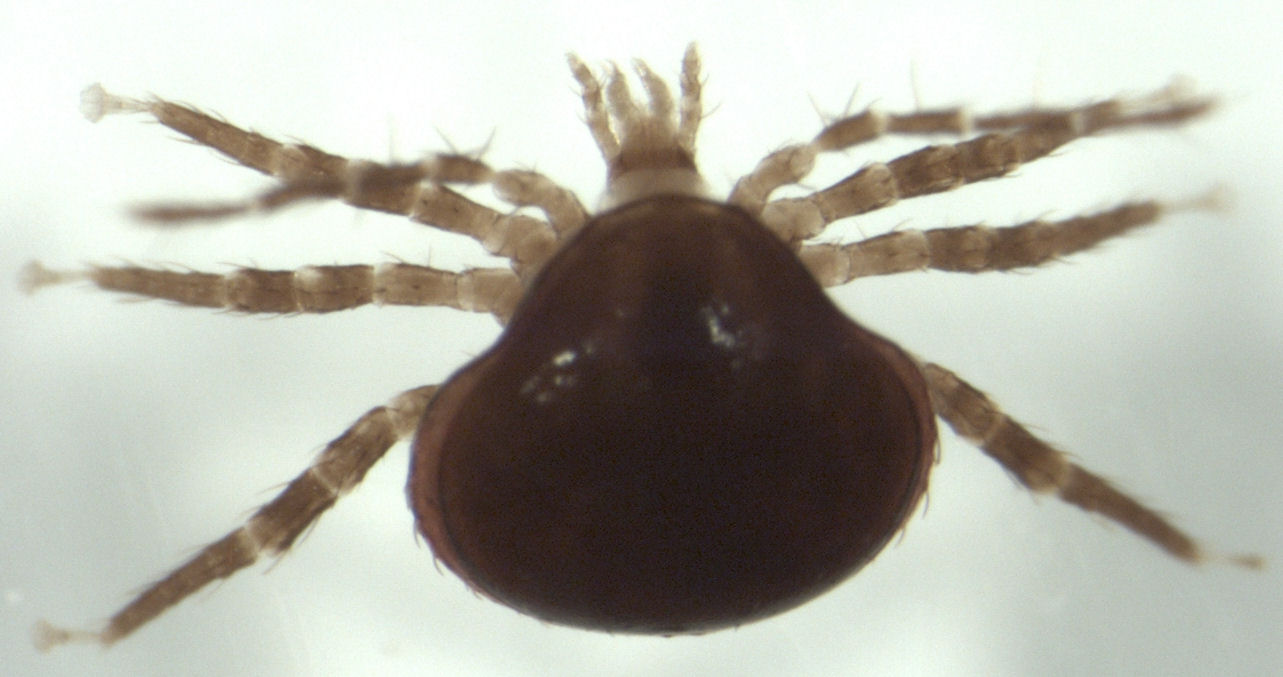
- Micromegistus, New Zealand

Scientific classification
- Kingdom: Animalia
- Phylum: Arthropoda
- Subphylum: Chelicerata
- Class: Arachnida
- Order: Mesostigmata
- Suborder: Trigynaspida; Camin & Gorirossi, 1955

Infraorders
- Antennophorina Camin & Gorirossi, 1955; Cercomegistina Camin & Gorirossi, 1955

= Trigynaspida =

Suborder of mites

Trigynaspida is a suborder of mites in the order Mesostigmata. There are more than 25 families and at least 90 described species in Trigynaspida.

== Families ==
These 27 families belong to the suborder Trigynaspida:

- Aenictequidae Kethley, 1977
- Antennophoridae Berlese, 1892
- Asternoseiidae Vale, 1954
- Celaenopsidae Berlese, 1892
- Cercomegistidae Trägårdh, 1937
- Costacaridae Hunter, 1993
- Davacaridae Kethley, 1977
- Diplogyniidae Trägårdh, 1941
- Euphysalozerconidae Kim, 2008
- Euzerconidae Trägårdh, 1938
- Fedrizziidae Trägårdh, 1937
- Hoplomegistidae Camin & Gorirossi, 1955
- Klinckowstroemiidae Camin & Gorirossi, 1955
- Megacelaenopsidae Funk, 1975
- Megisthanidae Berlese, 1914
- Messoracaridae Kethley, 1977
- Neotenogyniidae Kethley, 1974
- Paramegistidae Trägårdh, 1946
- Parantennulidae Willmann, 1941
- Philodanidae Kethley, 1977
- Promegistidae Kethley, 1977
- Ptochacaridae Kethley, 1977
- Pyrosejidae Lindquist & Moraza, 1993
- Saltiseiidae Walter, 2000
- Schizogyniidae Trägårdh, 1950
- Seiodidae Kethley, 1977
- Triplogyniidae Funk, 1977
