= Physalozercon =

Scientific classification
- Kingdom: Animalia
- Phylum: Arthropoda
- Subphylum: Chelicerata
- Class: Arachnida
- Order: Mesostigmata
- Infraorder: Antennophorina
- Superfamily: Aenictequoidea
- Family: Physalozerconidae; Kethley, 1977
- Genus: Physalozercon; Berlese, 1905
- Species: P. raffray

Binomial name
- Physalozercon raffray (Wasmann, 1902)

Genus of mites

Physalozercon raffray is a species of mite, placed in its own family, Physalozerconidae, in the order Mesostigmata.
