= Megalolaelaps =

Scientific classification
- Kingdom: Animalia
- Phylum: Arthropoda
- Subphylum: Chelicerata
- Class: Arachnida
- Order: Mesostigmata
- Family: Megalolaelapidae; Fonseca, 1946
- Genus: Megalolaelaps; Berlese, 1892

Genus of mites

Megalolaelaps is a small genus of mites in the order Mesostigmata, placed in its own family, Megalolaelapidae. Two species are recognised:

- Megalolaelaps haeros (Berlese, 1888)
- Megalolaelaps ornatus (Keegan, 1946)
