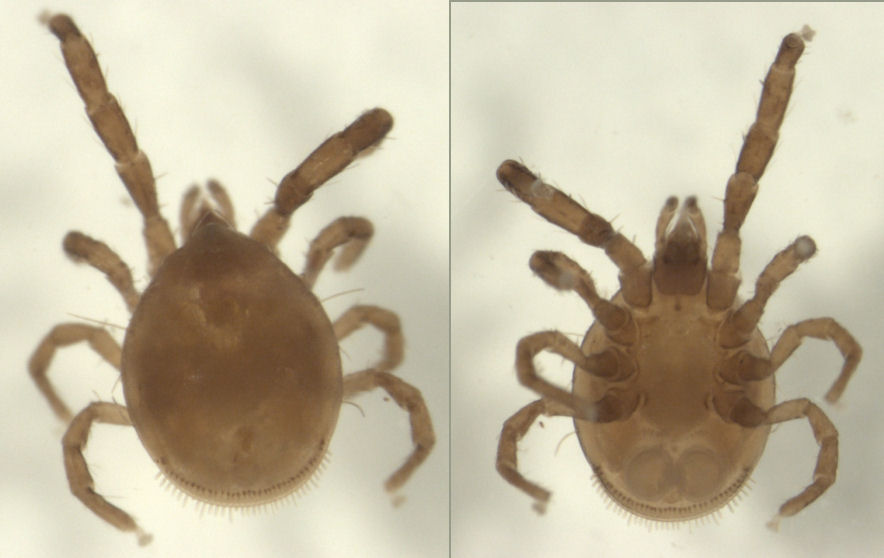
- Berzercon ferdinandi, New Zealand

Scientific classification
- Kingdom: Animalia
- Phylum: Arthropoda
- Subphylum: Chelicerata
- Class: Arachnida
- Order: Mesostigmata
- Suborder: Sejida; Kramer, 1885

Superfamilies
- Heterozerconoidea Berlese, 1892; Sejoidea Berlese, 1885

= Sejida =

Sejida Temporal range: Cenomanian–Recent

Suborder of mites

Sejida is a suborder of mites in the order Mesostigmata. There are about 5 families and 13 described species in Sejida. The oldest known record of the group is an indeterminate deutonymph belonging to Sejidae from the mid Cretaceous (Albian-Cenomanian) aged Burmese amber of Myanmar.

== Families ==
These five families belong to the suborder Sejida:

- Discozerconidae Berlese, 1910
- Heterozerconidae Berlese, 1892
- Ichthyostomatogasteridae Sellnick, 1953
- Sejidae Berlese, 1885
- Uropodellidae Camin, 1955
