= Andregamasus =

Scientific classification
- Domain: Eukaryota
- Kingdom: Animalia
- Phylum: Arthropoda
- Subphylum: Chelicerata
- Class: Arachnida
- Order: Mesostigmata
- Family: Podocinidae
- Genus: Andregamasus; Costa, 1965

Genus of mites

Andregamasus is a genus of mites in the family Podocinidae. There are at least three described species in Andregamasus.

== Species ==
These three species belong to the genus Andregamasus:

- Andregamasus branchiophilus Costa, 1972
- Andregamasus conchylicola Andre, 1937
- Andregamasus steinitzii Costa, 1965
