= Derrickia =

Scientific classification
- Domain: Eukaryota
- Kingdom: Animalia
- Phylum: Arthropoda
- Subphylum: Chelicerata
- Class: Arachnida
- Order: Mesostigmata
- Family: Podocinidae
- Genus: Derrickia; Womersley, 1956

Genus of mites

Derrickia is a genus of mites in the family Podocinidae.
