= Ptochacarus =

Scientific classification
- Kingdom: Animalia
- Phylum: Arthropoda
- Subphylum: Chelicerata
- Class: Arachnida
- Order: Mesostigmata
- Suborder: Trigynaspida
- Infraorder: Antennophorina
- Superfamily: Aenictequoidea
- Family: Ptochacaridae; Kethley, 1977
- Genus: Ptochacarus; Silvestri, 1911

Genus of mites

Ptochacarus is a genus of mites in its own family, Ptochacaridae, in the order Mesostigmata.

== Species ==
- Ptochacarus banksi Womersley, 1958
- Ptochacarus daveyi Silvestri, 1911
- Ptochacarus silvestrii Womersley, 1958
