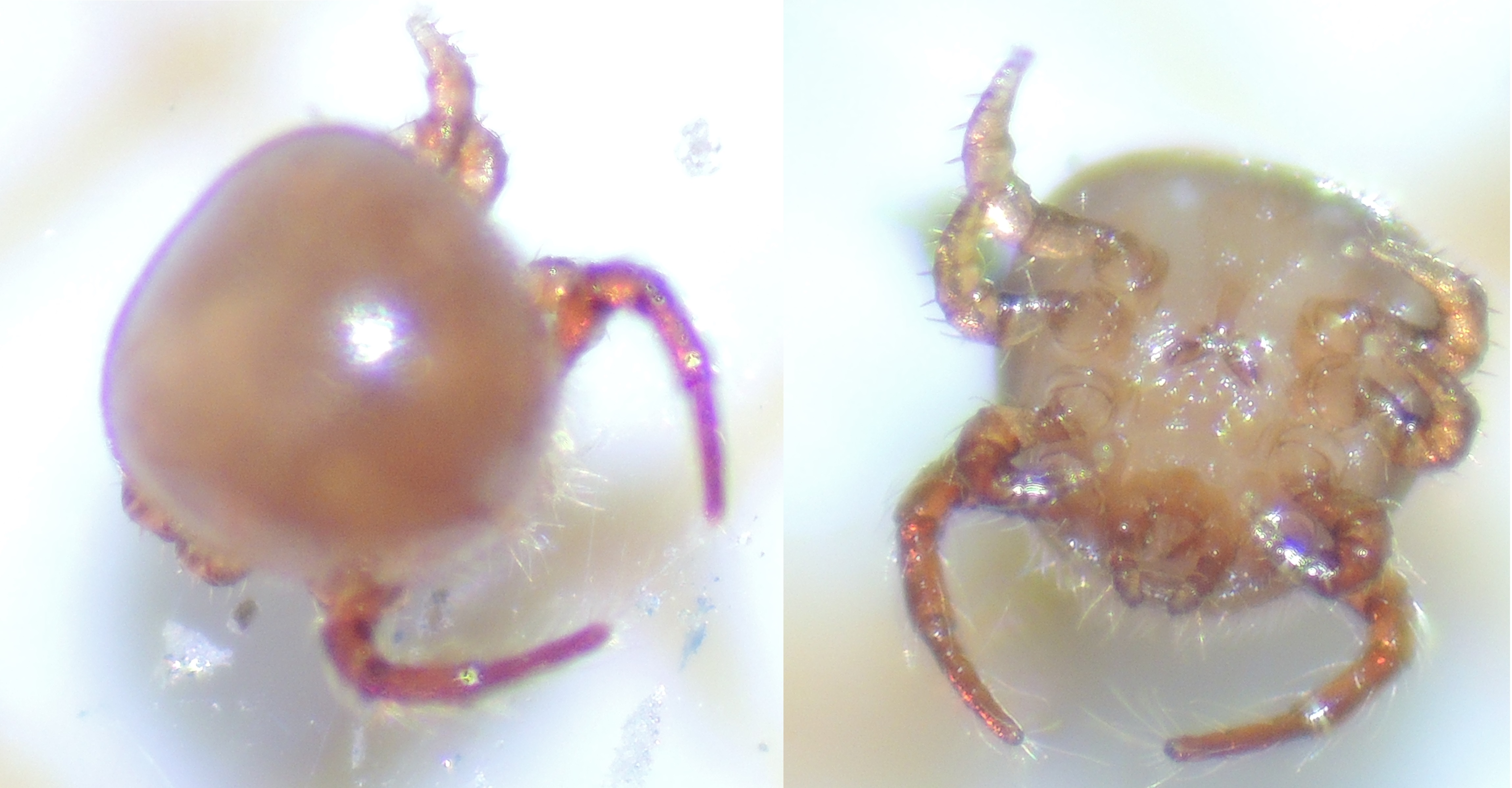

Scientific classification
- Kingdom: Animalia
- Phylum: Arthropoda
- Subphylum: Chelicerata
- Class: Arachnida
- Order: Mesostigmata
- Family: Antennophoridae
- Genus: Antennophorus; Haller, 1877

= Antennophorus =

Genus of mites

Antennophorus is a genus of mites in the family Antennophoridae. It was described by Haller in 1877.

== Species ==
- Antennophorus boveni (Wisniewski & Hirschmann, 1992)
- Antennophorus grandis Berlese, 1903 - is an ectoparasite to ants of the species Lasius flavus.
- Antennophorus goesswaldi (Wisniewski & Hirschmann, 1992)
- Antennophorus krantzi (Wisniewski & Hirschmann, 1992)
- Antennophorus pavani (Wisniewski & Hirschmann, 1992)
- Antennophorus uhlmanni (Haller, 1877)
