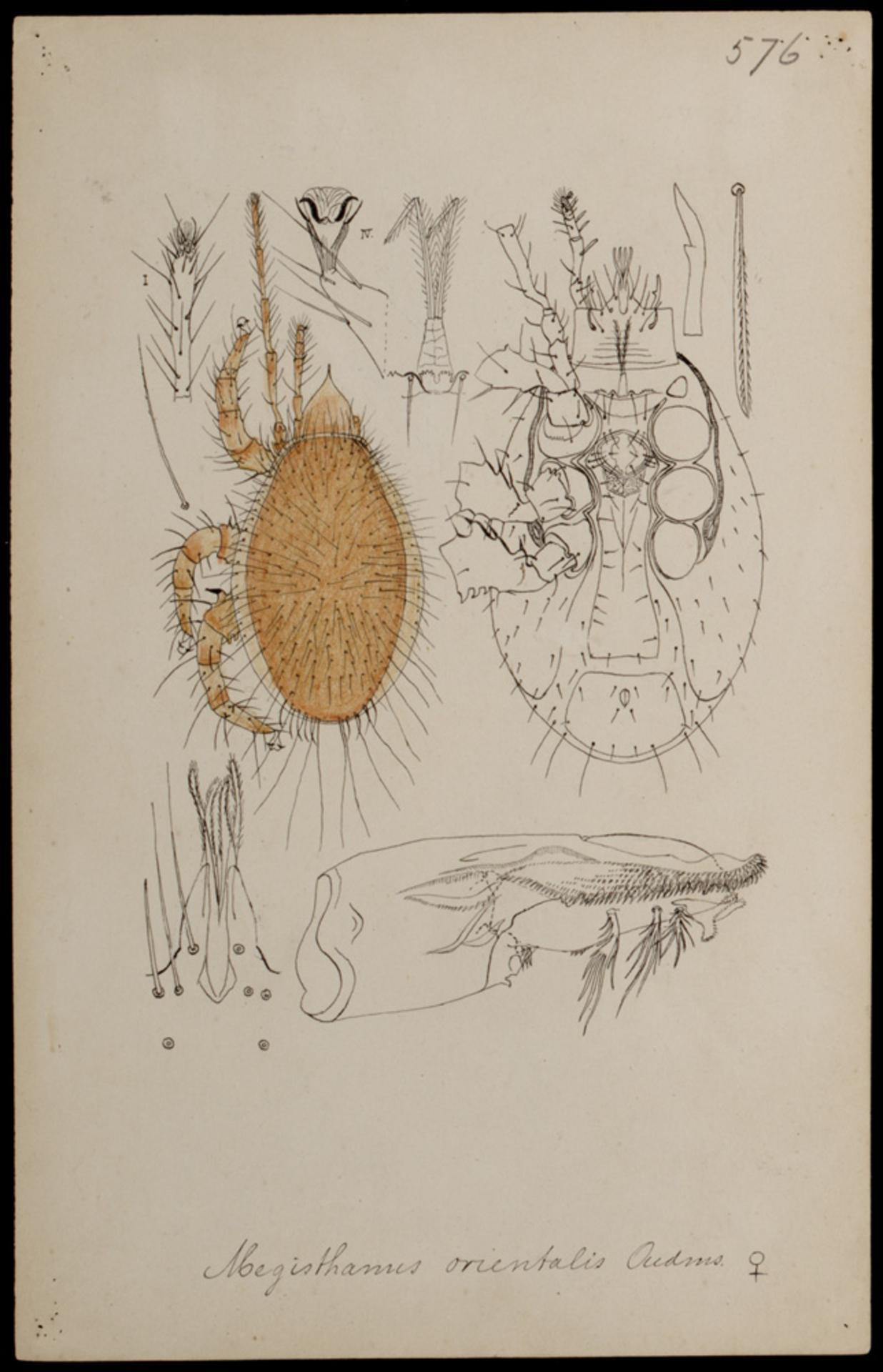
- Megisthanus orientalis

Scientific classification
- Kingdom: Animalia
- Phylum: Arthropoda
- Subphylum: Chelicerata
- Class: Arachnida
- Order: Mesostigmata
- Family: Megisthanidae
- Genus: Megisthanus; Thorell, 1882

= Megisthanus =

Genus of mites

Megisthanus is a genus of predatory mites in the family Megisthanidae. There are at least four described species in Megisthanus.

== Species ==
These four species belong to the genus Megisthanus:

- Megisthanus floridanus Banks
- Megisthanus jacobsoni Warburton
- Megisthanus orientalis Oudemans, 1905
- Megisthanus postsetosus Karg, 1996
