= Arctacarus =

Scientific classification
- Domain: Eukaryota
- Kingdom: Animalia
- Phylum: Arthropoda
- Subphylum: Chelicerata
- Class: Arachnida
- Order: Mesostigmata
- Family: Arctacaridae
- Genus: Arctacarus; Evans, 1955

Genus of mites

Arctacarus is a genus of mites in the family Arctacaridae. They are found in tundra and mountain regions of Asia and North America.

== Species ==
These three species are members of the genus Arctacarus:

- Arctacarus rostratus Evans, 1955
- Arctacarus beringianus Bregetova, 1977
- Arctacarus dzungaricus Bregetova, 1977
