= Paralana =

Scientific classification
- Kingdom: Animalia
- Phylum: Arthropoda
- Subphylum: Chelicerata
- Class: Arachnida
- Order: Mesostigmata
- Family: Diarthrophallidae
- Genus: Paralana; Schuster & Summers, 1978

Genus of mites

Paralana is a genus of mites in the family Diarthrophallidae. They were named by Schuster & Summers in 1978, and the type species is Paralana proculae.

Diarthrophallids are associated with the Passalidae family of beetles in their adult stage, and probably occur wherever their hosts occur.
