= Arctacarus dzungaricus =

Scientific classification
- Domain: Eukaryota
- Kingdom: Animalia
- Phylum: Arthropoda
- Subphylum: Chelicerata
- Class: Arachnida
- Order: Mesostigmata
- Family: Arctacaridae
- Genus: Arctacarus
- Species: A. dzungaricus

Binomial name
- Arctacarus dzungaricus Bregetova, 1977

Species of mite

Arctacarus dzungaricus is a species of mite in the family Arctacaridae.
