= Brachytremelloides =

Scientific classification
- Kingdom: Animalia
- Phylum: Arthropoda
- Subphylum: Chelicerata
- Class: Arachnida
- Order: Mesostigmata
- Family: Diarthrophallidae
- Genus: Brachytremelloides; Womersley, 1961

Genus of mites

Brachytremelloides is a genus of mites in the family Diarthrophallidae.

== Species ==
- Brachytremelloides brevipoda Schuster & Summers, 1978
- Brachytremelloides mastigophora Schuster & Summers, 1978
- Brachytremelloides minuta Schuster & Summers, 1978
- Brachytremelloides striata Womersley, 1961
