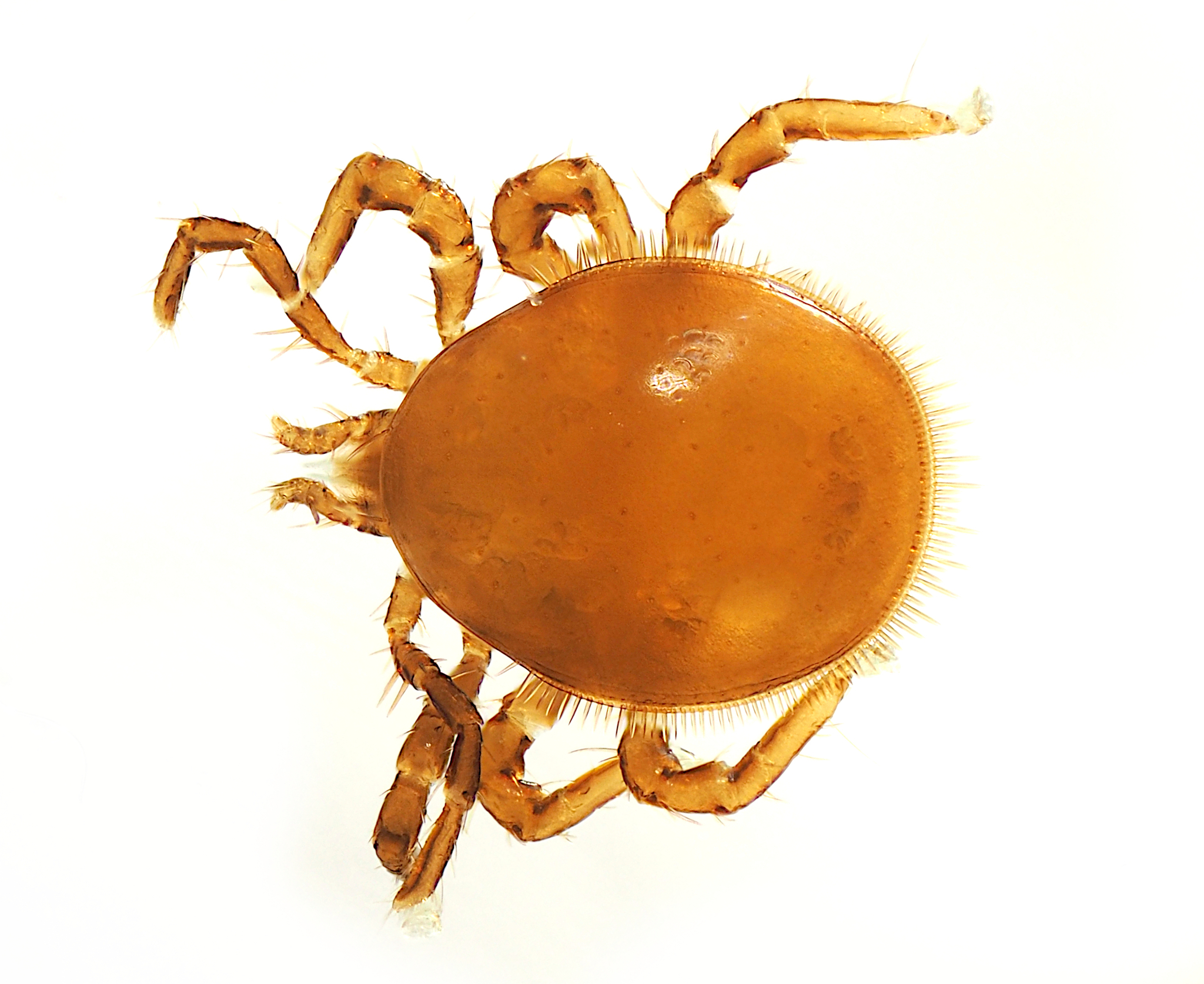
- Photo of Promegistus armstrongi

Scientific classification
- Kingdom: Animalia
- Phylum: Arthropoda
- Subphylum: Chelicerata
- Class: Arachnida
- Order: Mesostigmata
- Family: Promegistidae; Kethley, 1977
- Genus: Promegistus; Womersley, 1958

Type species
- Promegistus armstrongi Womersley, 1958

Other species
- Promegistus sachai Seeman & Baker, 2025

= Promegistus =

Family of mites

Promegistus is a genus of parasitiform mite in the order Mesostigmata, suborder Trigynaspida. It is the only member of the family Promegistidae (being placed in its original description in the family Paramegistidae). It is endemic to Australia. It contains two species, Promegistus armstrongi and Promegistus sachai. Adults are believed to be parasitic on large carabid beetles, while young juveniles like other trigynaspids are thought to be free living.
