= Podocinum =

Scientific classification
- Kingdom: Animalia
- Phylum: Arthropoda
- Subphylum: Chelicerata
- Class: Arachnida
- Order: Mesostigmata
- Family: Podocinidae
- Genus: Podocinum; Berlese, 1882

Genus of mites

Podocinum is a genus of mites in the family Podocinidae. There are more than 30 described species in Podocinum.

== Species ==
These 31 species belong to the genus Podocinum:

- Podocinum aciculatum Evans & Hyatt, 1958
- Podocinum agilis Arutunyan, 1974
- Podocinum anhuense Wen, 1965
- Podocinum aokii
- Podocinum bengalensis Bhattacharyya, 1968
- Podocinum catenulum De Leon, 1964
- Podocinum catenum Ishikawa, 1970
- Podocinum changchunense Liang, 1993
- Podocinum guizhouense Yan & Jin, 2011
- Podocinum hainanense Liang, 1993
- Podocinum jamaicense Evans & Hyatt, 1958
- Podocinum jianfenglingense Liang, 1993
- Podocinum mediocre Berlese, 1913
- Podocinum minus Berlese, 1913
- Podocinum monilicum Halliday, 1990
- Podocinum nepalense Evans & Hyatt, 1958
- Podocinum orientale Evans & Hyatt, 1958
- Podocinum pacificum Berlese, 1886
- Podocinum pintungense Ho, Ma & Wang, 2009
- Podocinum protonotum
- Podocinum pugnorum De Leon, 1964
- Podocinum ruwenzoriense Evans & Hyatt, 1958
- Podocinum sagax (Berlese, 1882)
- Podocinum sibiricum Volonikhina, 1999
- Podocinum stellatum Ma & Wang, 1998
- Podocinum sumatrense Evans & Hyatt, 1958
- Podocinum taylori Halliday, 1990
- Podocinum tianmonum Liang, 1992
- Podocinum tibetensis
- Podocinum tsushimanum
- Podocinum tupinamba
