= Polytrechna =

Scientific classification
- Domain: Eukaryota
- Kingdom: Animalia
- Phylum: Arthropoda
- Subphylum: Chelicerata
- Class: Arachnida
- Order: Mesostigmata
- Family: Diarthrophallidae
- Genus: Polytrechna; Schuster & Summers, 1978

Genus of mites

Polytrechna is a genus of mites in the family Diarthrophallidae.
