= Dinychidae =

Scientific classification
- Kingdom: Animalia
- Phylum: Arthropoda
- Subphylum: Chelicerata
- Class: Arachnida
- Order: Mesostigmata
- Family: Dinychidae; Berlese, 1916

Family of mites

Dinychidae is a family of mites in the order Mesostigmata.

== Taxonomy ==
- Genus Castriimonaspis W. Hirschmann, 1984
  - Castriimonaspis castrii (Hirschmann, 1972)
- Genus Clausiadinychus Sellnick, 1930
  - Clausiadinychus cristatus Sellnick, 1930
  - Clausiadinychus pulcherrimus Hutu, 1991
  - Clausiadinychus quadricaudatus Hirschmann, 1973
  - Clausiadinychus sellnicki Hutu, 1991
  - Clausiadinychus similicristatus Hirschmann, 1973
- Genus Dinychus Kramer, 1886
  - Dinychus arcuatus (Trägårdh, 1943)
  - Dinychus austeni (Hirst, 1923)
  - Dinychus bincheaecarinatus Hirschmann, Wagrowska-Adamczyk & Zirngiebl-Nicol, 1984
  - Dinychus camponoti Wisniewski & Hirschmann, 1983
  - Dinychus carinatus Berlese, 1903
  - Dinychus crassus Trägårdh, 1910
  - Dinychus dentatus Ma, 2003
  - Dinychus dilatatus Ma, 2000
  - Dinychus feideri Hutu, 1973
  - Dinychus fustipilis Sellnick, 1945
  - Dinychus greensladeae Bloszyk & Halliday, 1995
  - Dinychus hispanicus Hirschmann & Zirngiebl-Nicol, 1969
  - Dinychus inermis (C.L. Koch, 1841)
  - Dinychus kaluzi Masan, 1999
  - Dinychus kielczewskii Wisniewski, 1992
  - Dinychus kurosai Hiramatsu, 1978
  - Dinychus micropunctatus Evans, 1955
  - Dinychus onishii Hiramatsu, 1980
  - Dinychus onishii Hiramatsu, 1980
  - Dinychus ornatus (Fox, 1957)
  - Dinychus perforatus Kramer, 1886
  - Dinychus ruseki Athias-Binche, Bloszyk & Olszanowski, 1989
  - Dinychus sellnicki Hutu, 1973
  - Dinychus septentrionalis (Trägårdh, 1943)
  - Dinychus stratus Sellnick, 1945
  - Dinychus stratus Sellnick, 1945
  - Dinychus subcorticalis Wisniewski & Hirschmann, 1994
  - Dinychus sublaevis (Trägårdh, 1943)
  - Dinychus tetraphyllus Berlese, 1903
  - Dinychus tetraphyllus Berlese, 1903
  - Dinychus undulatus Sellnick, 1945
  - Dinychus woelkei Hirschmann & Zirngiebl-Nicol, 1969
- Genus Iphidinychus Berlese, 1913
  - Iphidinychus balazyi Hirschmann & Wisniewski, 1992
  - Iphidinychus gaieri (Schweizer, 1961)
  - Iphidinychus johnstoni (Hirschmann, 1979)
  - Iphidinychus kakumeiensis Hiramatsu & Hirschmann, 1992
  - Iphidinychus manicatas Berlese, 1913
  - Iphidinychus sudeticus Hirschmann, 1992
- Genus Leiodinychus Berlese, 1917
  - Leiodinychus krameri (G. Canestrini & R. Canestrini, 1882)
- Genus Lindquistidiaspis W. Hirschmann, 1984
  - Lindquistidiaspis lindquisti (Hirschmann, 1979)
- Genus Rotundadinychus W. Hirschmann, 1984
  - Rotundadinychus rotundus (Hiramatsu & Hirschmann, 1977)
- Genus Sellnickiobovella W. Hirschmann, 1984
  - Sellnickiobovella decui (Hutu, 1977)
  - Sellnickiobovella hilli (Sellnick, 1970)
  - Sellnickiobovella loksai (Hirschmann & Zirngiebl-Nicol, 1972)
  - Sellnickiobovella marmorea (Fox, 1948)
  - Sellnickiobovella negreai (Hutu, 1977)
- Genus Tricuspisobovella W. Hirschmann, 1984
  - Tricuspisobovella magna (Hiramatsu & Hirschmann, 1977)
  - Tricuspisobovella tricuspis (Sellnick, 1973)
- Genus Urodiaspis Berlese, 1916
  - Urodiaspis engelhardti (Hirschmann & Zirngiebl-Nicol, 1969)
  - Urodiaspis franzi Hirschmann & Zirngiebl-Nicol, 1969
  - Urodiaspis honesta (Hiramatsu, 1983)
  - Urodiaspis nicolae Hirschmann, 1984
  - Urodiaspis pannonica Willmann, 1951
  - Urodiaspis rectangulovata Berlese, 1916
  - Urodiaspis sandankyoensis (Hiramatsu, 1979)
  - Urodiaspis sejiformis Wisniewski & Hirschmann, 1993
  - Urodiaspis shcherbakae (Hirschmann, 1972)
  - Urodiaspis stammeri Hirschmann & Zirngiebl-Nicol, 1969
  - Urodiaspis tectus (Kramer, 1876)
  - Urodiaspis tetragonoides (Berlese, 1916)
  - Urodiaspis yonakuniensis (Hiramatsu, 1979)
- Genus Urofossaaspis W. Hirschmann, 1984
  - Urofossaaspis aokii (Hiramatsu, 1982)
  - Urofossaaspis religiosa (Hiramatsu, 1979)
  - Urofossaaspis similireligiosa (Hiramatsu, 1979)
- Genus Walkerdiaspis W. Hirschmann, 1984
  - Walkerdiaspis walkeri (Hirschmann & Zirngiebl-Nicol, 1969)
