= Discourella =

Scientific classification
- Kingdom: Animalia
- Phylum: Arthropoda
- Subphylum: Chelicerata
- Class: Arachnida
- Order: Mesostigmata
- Suborder: Monogynaspida
- Infraorder: Uropodina
- Superfamily: Uropodoidea
- Family: Discourellidae; Baker & Wharton, 1952
- Genus: Discourella; Berlese, 1910

Genus of mites

Discourella is a genus of mites in the order Mesostigmata, placed in its own family, Discourellidae.

== Species ==
- Discourella anemoniae Hirschmann, 1972
- Discourella aokii Hiramatsu, 1979
- Discourella artificiosa Hiramatsu, 1979
- Discourella baloghi Hirschmann & Zirngiebl-Nicol, 1969
- Discourella baloghisimilis Wisniewski, 1984
- Discourella brasiliensis Hirschmann, 1972
- Discourella caputmedusae (Berlese & Leonardi, 1901)
- Discourella caputmedusaesimilis Hirschmann, 1972
- Discourella clivosa Hirschmann, 1972
- Discourella cordieri (Berlese, 1916)
- Discourella cosmogyna Berlese, 1910
- Discourella crucisimilis Hirschmann, 1972
- Discourella curtipila (J. F. Marais & G. C. Loots, 1979)
- Discourella deraiophoroides Hirschmann, 1972
- Discourella ditricha Hirschmann, 1972
- Discourella domotoi Hiramatsu, 1979
- Discourella dubiosa (Schweizer, 1961)
- Discourella eucoma (Willmann, 1951)
- Discourella eustructura Hirschmann, 1972
- Discourella falcata Hirschmann, 1972
- Discourella fissilis Hirschmann, 1972
- Discourella foraminosa Hiramatsu & Hirschmann, 1979
- Discourella formosa Hirschmann, 1972
- Discourella franzi Hirschmann & Zirngiebl-Nicol, 1969
- Discourella frondosa Hirschmann, 1972
- Discourella fumiakii Hiramatsu, 1980
- Discourella gatlinburgiana Wisniewski & Hirschmann, 1994
- Discourella gerlachl Hirschmann, 1972
- Discourella gracilis Hirschmann, 1973
- Discourella hirschmanni Hiramatsu, 1983
- Discourella hispanica Hirschmann & Zirngiebl-Nicol, 1969
- Discourella illustris Hiramatsu, 1983
- Discourella inflata (Marais & Loots, 1979)
- Discourella ishikawai Hiramatsu, 1979
- Discourella kaszabi Hirschmann, 1972
- Discourella komoroensis Hiramatsu, 1979
- Discourella koreae Hirschmann, 1981
- Discourella lindquisti Hiramatsu & Hirschmann, 1979
- Discourella longicarínata Hirschmann, 1972
- Discourella longipilosa Hiramatsu, 1980
- Discourella matsuurae Hiramatsu, 1983
- Discourella mexicana Hirschmann, 1979
- Discourella mihali (Masan, 1999)
- Discourella miyakawai Hiramatsu, 1979
- Discourella modesta (Leonardi, 1899)
- Discourella modestasimilis Hiramatsu & Hirschmann, 1979
- Discourella morikawai Hiramatsu, 1979
- Discourella omogoensis Hiramatsu, 1979
- Discourella onishii Hiramatsu, 1979
- Discourella orbiculata Hiramatsu, 1983
- Discourella pectoralis Hirschmann, 1972
- Discourella porosa Hirschmann, 1972
- Discourella porula Hirschmann, 1972
- Discourella pulcherrima Masan, 1999
- Discourella radnaensis (Wlllmann, 1941)
- Discourella reticulata Hirschmann, 1972
- Discourella rotunda Hirschmann, 1972
- Discourella rotundasimilis Hirschmann, 1973
- Discourella rotundiformis Hirschmann, 1973
- Discourella ruehmi Hirschmann, 1972
- Discourella salignifolia Hirschmann, 1972
- Discourella sellnicki Hirschmann & Zirngiebl-Nicol, 1969
- Discourella silvestrisa Hiramatsu, 1977
- Discourella simonbolivari Hutu, 1987
- Discourella solaris Hirschmann, 1972
- Discourella spumans Hirschmann, 1972
- Discourella stammeri Hirschmann & Zirngiebl-Nicol, 1969
- Discourella torpida Hiramatsu & Hirschmann, 1979
- Discourella tuberculata Hirschmann, 1973
- Discourella tuberosa Hirschmann, 1972
- Discourella venezuelensis Hutu, 1987
- Discourella woelkei Hirschmann, 1975
