= Macrodinychus multispinosus =

Scientific classification
- Kingdom: Animalia
- Phylum: Arthropoda
- Subphylum: Chelicerata
- Class: Arachnida
- Order: Mesostigmata
- Family: Macrodinychidae
- Genus: Macrodinychus
- Species: M. multispinosus

Binomial name
- Macrodinychus multispinosus Sellnick, 1973

Species of mite

Macrodinychus multispinosus is a mite that lives as an ectoparasitoid on the invasive Paratrechina longicornis. These mites complete their development on a single host, sucking all of its body content and therefore killing it. This is the ninth species of Macrodinychus reported as ant parasite, and the third known as parasitoid of invasive ants, confirming a unique habit in the evolution of mite feeding strategies and suggesting that the entire genus might be parasitic on ants.

== Morphology ==
M. multispinosus larva measure to be approximately 174.2 micrometers (lengthwise) by 104 micrometers(width) in size. They possess long legs approximate to body size, and can make up 48.3% of their body length. In protonymph stage, loss of function in the legs is due to the feeding stage, where they remain immobile. Protonymphs have been measured to be approximately 480 micrometers by 350 micrometers in body size. When the mites reach deutonymph stage, or adult stage, the body length differentiates greatly between male and female mites. Adult males can have a body length up to 830 micrometers, while adult females will be at a maximum length of 540 micrometers.

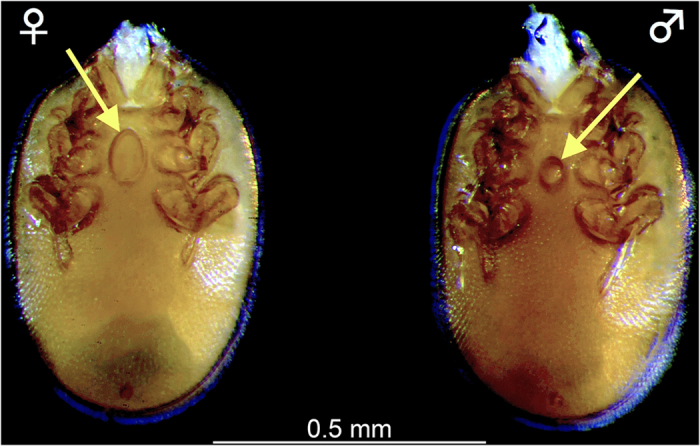
Left: ventral view of a female; right: ventral view of a male.

The species is dioecious, and differentiation will begin to show in the adult stage. The sexual dimorphism is distinguished by the size of the genital plate, which is larger and more ovular in females.

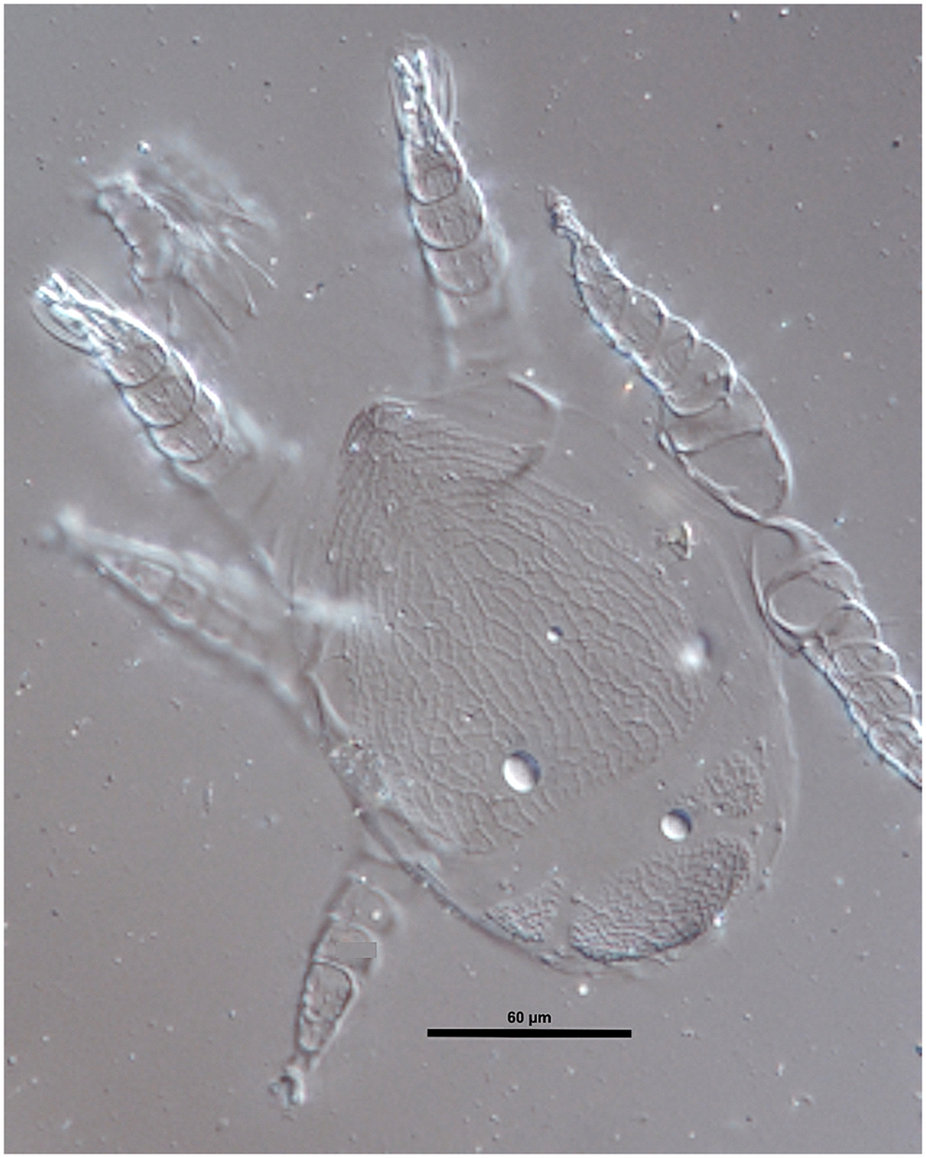
Dorsal view of M. multispinosus larva

== Life cycle ==
The life cycle of M. multispinosus is similar to that of Macrodinychus sellnicki. There are three developmental stages: larval stage, protonymph stage, and deutonymph stage. During the larval stage, the mite is responsible for searching for its host P. longicornis pupa. The protonymph and deutonymph stages are two feeding stages, where they remain immobile. As a parasitoid, the M. multispinosus larva will remain attached to the ant pupa until adult stage of development, which is usually where the ant pupa will die. The life cycle, on average, lasts for about 30 days from larva to adult. Females will form 7 days after copulation and the larvae will form 37 days later.

== Attachment ==
Attachment onto the host occurs during the mite's larval stage. Compared to other species within the genus, the larva will attach to the underside of the host pupa's head capsule. One of the most popular hosts for the M. multispinosus is the longhorn crazy ant.

== Hosts ==
The M. multispinosus is most known for its trait of attaching onto longhorn crazy ants. Once it has attached onto the ants pupa it begins to drain the ant of its haemolymph. The haemolymph is roughly the equivalent of a human's blood. It is the fluid that flows through the ant. M. multispinosus doesn't just suck the ants internal fluids, but also begins to consume the internal tissue within the ant's pupa. The host ants that are sought out by M. multispinosusare the worker ants. This is due to making sure the reproductive portions of the ant colonies are unaffected so the number of hosts for the parasite to infect is always growing. Regardless, the infection and death of worker ants by M. multispinosuscan prove deadly for ant colonies if the parasite is present in large numbers.
