= Metagynella =

Scientific classification
- Kingdom: Animalia
- Phylum: Arthropoda
- Subphylum: Chelicerata
- Class: Arachnida
- Order: Mesostigmata
- Suborder: Monogynaspida
- Infraorder: Uropodina
- Superfamily: Uropodoidea
- Family: Metagynuridae; Baker & Wharton, 1952
- Genus: Metagynella; Berlese, 1919

Synonyms
- Metagynura Balogh, 1943

Genus of mites

Metagynella is a genus of mites, placed in its own family, Metagynuridae in the order Mesostigmata.

== Species ==
- Metagynella africana Ryke, 1958
- Metagynella applicata (Vitzthum, 1921)
- Metagynella baloghi Hirschmann, 1975
- Metagynella carpathica (Balogh, 1943)
- Metagynella cubana Wisniewski & Hirschmann, 1993
- Metagynella kargi Hirschmann, 1975
- Metagynella kleinei (Vitzthum, 1921)
- Metagynella kurosai Hiramatsu, 1979
- Metagynella lindquisti Hirschmann, 1979
- Metagynella mexicana Hirschmann, 1979
- Metagynella moseri Hirschmann, 1975
- Metagynella moserisimilis Hiramatsu, 1981
- Metagynella parvula Camin, 1953
- Metagynella vietnamensis Hiramatsu, 1981
