= Podocinidae =

Scientific classification
- Kingdom: Animalia
- Phylum: Arthropoda
- Subphylum: Chelicerata
- Class: Arachnida
- Order: Mesostigmata
- Family: Podocinidae; Berlese, 1913

Family of mites

Podocinidae is a family of mites in the order Mesostigmata.

== Genera ==
- Aceoseius Sellnick, 1941
  - Aceoseius muricatus (C. L. Koch, 1839)
- Andregamasus Costa, 1965
  - Andregamasus conchylicola (André, 1937)
- Derrickia Womersley, 1956
  - Derrickia setosa Womersley, 1956
- Episeiella Willmann, 1938
  - Episeiella heteropoda Willmann, 1938
- Podocinella Evans & Hyatt, 1958
  - Podocinella meghalayaensis Bhattacharyya, 1994
  - Podocinella plumosa Evans & Hyatt, 1958
- Podocinum Berlese, 1882
  - Podocinum changchunense Liang, 1993
  - Podocinum hainanense Liang, 1993
  - Podocinum jianfenlingense Liang, 1993
  - Podocinum monolicum Halliday, 1990
  - Podocinum pacificum Berlese, 1895
  - Podocinum protonotum Ishikawa & Saichuae, 1997
  - Podocinum sagax (Berlese, 1882)
  - Podocinum sibiricum Volonikhina, 1999
  - Podocinum stellatum Ma-Liming & Wang-Shenron, 1998
  - Podocinum taylori Halliday, 1990
  - Podocinum tianmuense Liang, 1993
