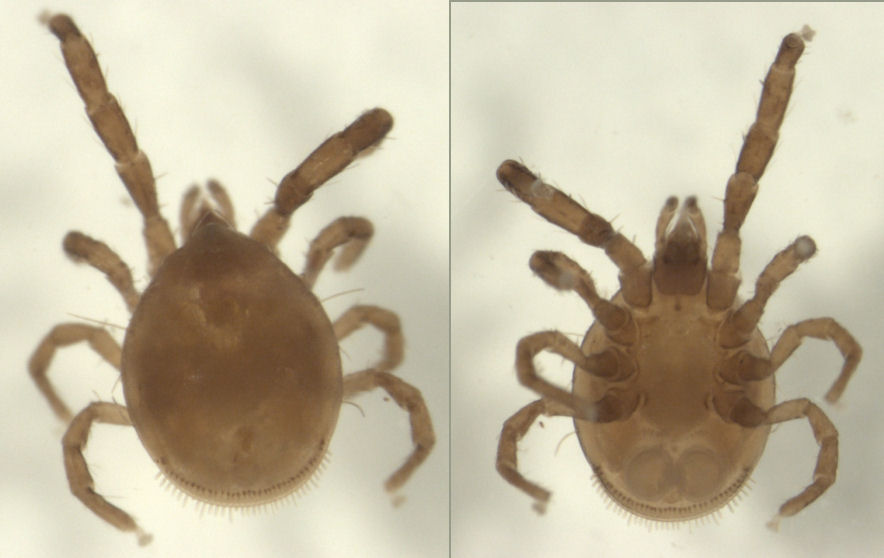
- Berzercon ferdinandi (male)

Scientific classification
- Kingdom: Animalia
- Phylum: Arthropoda
- Subphylum: Chelicerata
- Class: Arachnida
- Order: Mesostigmata
- Family: Discozerconidae
- Genus: Berzercon
- Species: B. ferdinandi

Binomial name
- Berzercon ferdinandi Seeman & Baker, 2013

= Berzercon =

Genus of mites

Berzercon ferdinandi is a species of mite. It is the only species of the monotypic genus Berzercon (Seeman & Baker, 2013).

== Distribution ==
The species is found in the North Island of New Zealand, on large carabid beetles.
