= Proarctacarus johnstoni =

Scientific classification
- Kingdom: Animalia
- Phylum: Arthropoda
- Subphylum: Chelicerata
- Class: Arachnida
- Order: Mesostigmata
- Family: Arctacaridae
- Genus: Proarctacarus
- Species: P. johnstoni

Binomial name
- Proarctacarus johnstoni Makarova, 2003

Species of mite

Proarctacarus johnstoni is a species of mite in the family Arctacaridae.
