= Episeiella =

Scientific classification
- Domain: Eukaryota
- Kingdom: Animalia
- Phylum: Arthropoda
- Subphylum: Chelicerata
- Class: Arachnida
- Order: Mesostigmata
- Family: Podocinidae
- Genus: Episeiella; Willmann, 1938

Genus of mites

Episeiella is a genus of mites in the family Podocinidae.
