= Aenicteques =

Scientific classification
- Kingdom: Animalia
- Phylum: Arthropoda
- Subphylum: Chelicerata
- Class: Arachnida
- Order: Mesostigmata
- Suborder: Trigynaspida
- Infraorder: Antennophorina
- Superfamily: Aenictequoidea
- Family: Aenictequidae; Kethley, 1977
- Genus: Aenicteques; Jacot, 1939

Genus of mites

Aenictegues is the only genus of mites in the family Aenictequidae, in the order Mesostigmata.
