= Proarctacarus =

Scientific classification
- Domain: Eukaryota
- Kingdom: Animalia
- Phylum: Arthropoda
- Subphylum: Chelicerata
- Class: Arachnida
- Order: Mesostigmata
- Family: Arctacaridae
- Genus: Proarctacarus; Makarova, 2003

Type species
- Proarctacarus canadensis Makarova, 2003

Genus of mites

Proarctacarus is a genus of mites in the family Arctacaridae. They are found in coniferous forests in mountain regions of western North America.

== Species ==
These three species are members of the genus Proarctacarus:

- Proarctacarus canadensis Makarova, 2003
- Proarctacarus johnstoni Makarova, 2003
- Proarctacarus oregonensis Makarova, 2003
