= Cornubia =

Cornubia can be:

- Cornubia, the ancient Latin name for either:
  - Cornouaille, a historic region in Brittany, northwestern France
  - Cornwall, a region in southwestern England
- Cornubia, a geologists' name for the Cornubian batholith, the granite massif of Devon and Cornwall in England
- Cornubia, Queensland, a southern suburb of Brisbane, Queensland, Australia
- Cornubia City, a new development north of Durban, South Africa
- SS Cornubia (ship)
- Cornubia (mite), a genus of mites
