= Iphidinychus =

Scientific classification
- Domain: Eukaryota
- Kingdom: Animalia
- Phylum: Arthropoda
- Subphylum: Chelicerata
- Class: Arachnida
- Order: Mesostigmata
- Family: Polyaspididae
- Genus: Iphidinychus; Berlese, 1913
- Species: I. gaieri

Binomial name
- Iphidinychus gaieri (Schweizer, 1961)

Genus of mites

Iphidinychus is a genus of mites in the family Polyaspididae. There is at least one described species in Iphidinychus, I. gaieri.
