= Microgyniidae =

Scientific classification
- Kingdom: Animalia
- Phylum: Arthropoda
- Subphylum: Chelicerata
- Class: Arachnida
- Order: Mesostigmata
- Suborder: Monogynaspida
- Infraorder: Uropodina
- Superfamily: Microgynioidea
- Family: Microgyniidae; Trägårdh, 1942

Family of mites

Microgyniidae is a small family of mites in the order Mesostigmata.

== Species ==
Microgyniidae contains two genera, with four recognized species:

- Genus Microsejus Trägårdh, 1942
  - Microsejus camini Trägårdh, 1942
- Genus Microgynium Trägårdh, 1942
  - Microgynium incisum Krantz, 1961
  - Microgynium rectangulatum Trägårdh, 1942
  - Microgynium brasiliensis Wisniewski & Hirschmann, 1993
