= Macrodinychus =

Scientific classification
- Kingdom: Animalia
- Phylum: Arthropoda
- Subphylum: Chelicerata
- Class: Arachnida
- Order: Mesostigmata
- Family: Macrodinychidae; Hirschmann, 1979
- Genus: Macrodinychus; Berlese, 1917

Genus of mites

Macrodinychus (from Ancient Greek μακρός (makrós), meaning "tail", δι- (di-), meaning "two", and ὄνυξ (ónux), meaning "claw") is the sole genus in the monotypic Macrodinychidae, a family of mites in the order Mesostigmata.

== Species ==
Macrodinychidae contains one genus, with 22 recognized species:

- Genus Macrodinychus Berlese, 1917
  - Macrodinychus andrassyi Hirschmann, 1975
  - Macrodinychus baloghi Hirschmann, 1975
  - Macrodinychus bregetovaae (Hirschmann, 1975)
  - Macrodinychus butuae (Hirschmann, 1975)
  - Macrodinychus durmei Hirschmann, 1983
  - Macrodinychus extremicus sp. nov.
  - Macrodinychus hirschmanni (Hiramatsu, 1977)
  - Macrodinychus iriomotensis Hiramatsu, 1979
  - Macrodinychus kaszabi (Hirschmann, 1975)
  - Macrodinychus kurosai Hiramatsu, 1975
  - Macrodinychus loksai Hirschmann, 1975
  - Macrodinychus mahunkai Hirschmann, 1975
  - Macrodinychus malayicus sp. nov.
  - Macrodinychus multipennus (Hiramatsu, 1977)
  - Macrodinychus multispinosus Sellnick, 1973
  - Macrodinychus parallelpipedus (Berlese, 1916)
    - Synonym Macrodinychus paraguayensis Hirschmann, 1975
  - Macrodinychus sellnicki (Hirschmann & Zirngiebl-Nicol, 1975)
  - Macrodinychus shibai Hiramatsu, 1980
  - Macrodinychus vietnamensis Hirschmann, 1983
  - Macrodinychus yonakuniensis Hiramatsu, 1979
  - Macrodinychus yoshidai Hiramatsu, 1979
  - Macrodinychus zicsii Hirschmann, 1975
