= Gustavo Leonardi =

Italian entomologist

Gustavo Leonardi (27 February 1869, Civezzano, County of Tyrol – 25 August 1918, Vintimille) was an Italian entomologist.

Leonardi was an entomology assistant in the universities of Padua and Portici before becoming a plant disease inspector at Vintimille. He wrote 45 publications on pest insects, such as Monografia delle Cocciniglie italiane (1920). With Agostino Lunardoni (1857–1933), he wrote a four-volume treatise on pest insects in Italy (1889–1901). With Antonio Berlese he issued the exsiccata series Chermotheca Italica (1895–1909).
