= Deraiophorus =

Scientific classification
- Kingdom: Animalia
- Phylum: Arthropoda
- Subphylum: Chelicerata
- Class: Arachnida
- Order: Mesostigmata
- Suborder: Monogynaspida
- Infraorder: Uropodina
- Superfamily: Uropodoidea
- Family: Deraiophoridae; Trägårdh, 1952
- Genus: Deraiophorus; G. Canestrini, 1897

Genus of mites

Deraiophorus is a genus of mites in the order Mesostigmata, placed in its own family, Deriaphoridae.

== Species ==
- Deraiophorus adriaticus Hirschmann & Zirngiebl-Nicol, 1972
- Deraiophorus aokii Hiramatsu, 1982
- Deraiophorus australis Hirschmann, 1973
- Deraiophorus baloghi Hirschmann, 1973
- Deraiophorus biroi G.Canestrini, 1897
- Deraiophorus borneoensis Hiramatsu, 1983
- Deraiophorus brasiliensis Hirschmann & Zirngiebl-Nicol, 1969
- Deraiophorus canestrinii Berlese, 1891
- Deraiophorus ceylonicus Hirschmann, 1973
- Deraiophorus chyzeri Canestrini, 1897
- Deraiophorus crassus Hiramatsu, 1979
- Deraiophorus dicornutosimilis Hirschmann, 1973
- Deraiophorus dicornutus Hirschmann, 1973
- Deraiophorus domrowi Hirschmann, 1973
- Deraiophorus endrodyi Hirschmann, 1973
- Deraiophorus foraminosus Hirschmann & Hiramatsu, 1990
- Deraiophorus haradai Hiramatsu, 1982
- Deraiophorus hexacornutosimilis Hirschmann, 1973
- Deraiophorus hexacornutus Hirschmann, 1973
- Deraiophorus hirschmanni Hiramatsu, 1977
- Deraiophorus hirschmannisimilis Hiramatsu, 1980
- Deraiophorus hummellincki Hirschmann, 1979
- Deraiophorus imadatei Hiramatsu, 1980
- Deraiophorus javensis Hiramatsu, 1980
- Deraiophorus kalimantanensis Hiramatsu, 1982
- Deraiophorus kaszabi Hirschmann, 1973
- Deraiophorus kaszabisimilis Hirschmann, 1973
- Deraiophorus kurosai Hiramatsu, 1979
- Deraiophorus lanatus Hirschmann, 1973
- Deraiophorus latus (Trägårdh, 1952)
- Deraiophorus leytensis Hirschmann & Hiramatsu, 1990
- Deraiophorus loksai Hirschmann, 1973
- Deraiophorus loksaisimilis Hirschmann, 1973
- Deraiophorus luzonensis Hirschmann & Hiramatsu, 1990
- Deraiophorus magnus Hiramatsu, 1982
- Deraiophorus mahunkai Hirschmann, 1973
- Deraiophorus manuleatus Hiramatsu & Hirschmann, 1978
- Deraiophorus matskasii Hirschmann, 1981
- Deraiophorus maya (Krantz, 1969)
- Deraiophorus melisi Hirschmann & Zirngiebl-Nicol, 1969
- Deraiophorus nemorivagus Hiramatsu, 1980
- Deraiophorus neobiroi Hirschmann, 1973
- Deraiophorus neobrasiliensis (Hirschmann & Zirngiebl-Nicol, 1969)
- Deraiophorus novaehollandiae (Domrow, 1957)
- Deraiophorus obscurus Hirschmann & Hiramatsu, 1990
- Deraiophorus orghidani Hutu, 1987
- Deraiophorus pecinai Hirschmann, 1990
- Deraiophorus penicillatasimiiis Hirschmann, 1973
- Deraiophorus penicillatus Hirschmann, 1973
- Deraiophorus piriformis Hirschmann, 1973
- Deraiophorus piriformoides Hirschmann & Hiramatsu, 1990
- Deraiophorus praelongus Hiramatsu & Hirschmann, 1978
- Deraiophorus pulchelloides Hirschmann & Zirngiebl-Nicol, 1972
- Deraiophorus rackae Hirschmann & Zirngiebl-Nicol, 1969
- Deraiophorus rosariae Hirschmann & Hiramatsu, 1990
- Deraiophorus schusteri Hirschmann & Zirngiebl-Nicol, 1969
- Deraiophorus sellnicki Hirschmann & Zirngiebl-Nicol, 1969
- Deraiophorus shiroyamaensis Hiramatsu, 1977
- Deraiophorus simplicior (Domrow, 1957)
- Deraiophorus sottoae Hirschmann, 1990
- Deraiophorus stammeri Hirschmann & Zirngiebl-Nicol, 1969
- Deraiophorus stammerisimilis Hirschmann, 1973
- Deraiophorus surdus Hiramatsu, 1983
- Deraiophorus talkeri Hirschmann, 1990
- Deraiophorus truncatus (Berlese, 1888)
- Deraiophorus willwanni Hirschmann & Zirngiebl-Nicol, 1969
- Deraiophorus zicsii Hirschmann, 1973
