= Diarthrophallidae =

Scientific classification
- Kingdom: Animalia
- Phylum: Arthropoda
- Subphylum: Chelicerata
- Class: Arachnida
- Order: Mesostigmata
- Family: Diarthrophallidae; Trägårdh, 1946

Family of mites

Diarthrophallidae is a family of mites in the order Mesostigmata.

== Species ==
- Abrotarsala R. O. Schuster & F. M. Summers, 1978
  - Abrotarsala arciformis Schuster & Summers, 1978
  - Abrotarsala cuneiformis Schuster & Summers, 1978
  - Abrotarsala firundule Schuster & Summers, 1978
  - Abrotarsala inconstans Schuster & Summers, 1978
  - Abrotarsala longifemoralis Schuster & Summers, 1978
  - Abrotarsala obesa Schuster & Summers, 1978
  - Abrotarsala pyriformis Schuster & Summers, 1978
  - Abrotarsala rimatoris R. O. Schuster & F. M. Summers, 1978
  - Abrotarsala simplex Schuster & Summers, 1978
  - Abrotarsala simulans Schuster & Summers, 1980
  - Abrotarsala turgescentis Schuster & Summers, 1980
- Acaridryas R. O. Schuster & F. M. Summers, 1978
  - Acaridryas miyatakei
- Africola Koçak & Kemal, 2008
  - Africola amnoni (Haitlinger, 2001)
  - Africola asperatus (Schuster & Summers, 1978)
  - Africola clypeolus (R. O. Schuster & F. M. Summers, 1978)
- Atrema R. O. Schuster & F. M. Summers, 1978
  - Atrema crassa Schuster & Summers, 1978
  - Atrema nasica Schuster & Summers, 1978
  - Atrema parvula Schuster & Summers, 1978
- Boerihemia Haitlinger, 1995
  - Boerihemia ajzoni Haitlinger, 1995
- Brachytremella Trägårdh, 1946
  - Brachytremella spinosa Trägårdh, 1946
- Brachytremelloides Womersley, 1961
  - Brachytremelloides brevipoda Schuster & Summers, 1978
  - Brachytremelloides mastigophora Schuster & Summers, 1978
  - Brachytremelloides minuta Schuster & Summers, 1978
  - Brachytremelloides striata Womersley, 1961
- Diarthrophallus Trägårdh, 1946
  - Diarthrophallus aurosus Schuster & Summers, 1978
  - Diarthrophallus cartwrighti (Hunter & Glover, 1968)
  - Diarthrophallus crivatus Schuster & Summers, 1978
  - Diarthrophallus fulvastrum Schuster & Summers, 1978
  - Diarthrophallus joanae (Hunter & Glover, 1968)
  - Diarthrophallus quercus (Pearse & Wharton, 1936)
- Eurysternodes Schuster & Summers, 1978
  - Eurysternodes tragardhi (Womersley, 1961)
- Hyllosihemia Haitlinger, 1995
  - Hyllosihemia belerofoni Haitlinger, 1995
- Liranotus R. O. Schuster & F. M. Summers, 1978
  - Liranotus liratus R. O. Schuster & F. M. Summers, 1978
  - Liranotus strigatus Schuster & Summers, 1978
- Lombardiniella Womersley, 1961
  - Lombardiniella bornemisszai (Womersley, 1961)
  - Lombardiniella gentilis (Lombardini, 1944)
  - Lombardiniella lombardinii Womersley, 1961
  - Lombardiniella rogburi Haitlinger, 1995
- Malasudis R. O. Schuster & F. M. Summers, 1978
  - Malasudis arii Haitlinger, 2001
  - Malasudis echinopus Schuster & Summers, 1978
  - Malasudis korae Haitlinger, 2001
  - Malasudis tribulus R. O. Schuster & F. M. Summers, 1978
  - Malasudis vernae Haitlinger, 2001
- Minyplax R. O. Schuster & F. M. Summers, 1978
  - Minyplax africanus R. O. Schuster & F. M. Summers, 1978
- Morvihemia Haitlinger, 1995
  - Morvihemia ghizari Haitlinger, 1995
- Paralana R. O. Schuster & F. M. Summers, 1978
  - Paralana proculae R. O. Schuster & F. M. Summers, 1978
- Passalana Womersley, 1961
  - Passalana peritrematica (Lombardini, 1951)
- Passalobia Lombardini, 1926
  - Passalobia hunteri Schuster & Summers, 1978
  - Passalobia minygaster Schuster & Summers, 1978
  - Passalobia quadricaudata Lombardini, 1926
- Passalobiella R. O. Schuster & F. M. Summers, 1978
  - Passalobiella colaptes Schuster & Summers, 1978
  - Passalobiella comantis Schuster & Summers, 1978
  - Passalobiella ctenophora Schuster & Summers, 1978
  - Passalobiella dubinerae (Hunter & Glover, 1968)
  - Passalobiella kolombiensis Schuster & Summers, 1978
  - Passalobiella patula Schuster & Summers, 1978
  - Passalobiella sellifera Schuster & Summers, 1978
  - Passalobiella spatha Schuster & Summers, 1978
  - Passalobiella subnuda Schuster & Summers, 1978
- Polytrechna R. O. Schuster & F. M. Summers, 1978
  - Polytrechna serrula R. O. Schuster & F. M. Summers, 1978
- Tenuiplanta R. O. Schuster & F. M. Summers, 1978
  - Tenuiplanta crossi (Hunter & Glover, 1968)
  - Tenuiplanta polypora Schuster & Summers, 1978
- Troctognathus R. O. Schuster & F. M. Summers, 1978
  - Troctognathus tetradis R. O. Schuster & F. M. Summers, 1978
