= Thinozercon =

Scientific classification
- Kingdom: Animalia
- Phylum: Arthropoda
- Subphylum: Chelicerata
- Class: Arachnida
- Order: Mesostigmata
- Suborder: Monogynaspida
- Infraorder: Uropodina
- Superfamily: Thinozerconoidea
- Family: Thinozerconidae; Halbert, 1915
- Genus: Thinozercon; Halbert, 1915
- Species: T. michaeli

Binomial name
- Thinozercon michaeli Halbert, 1915

Genus of mites

Thinozercon michaeli is a species of mite, placed in its own family, Thinozerconidae.
