= Celaenopsidae =

Scientific classification
- Kingdom: Animalia
- Phylum: Arthropoda
- Subphylum: Chelicerata
- Class: Arachnida
- Order: Mesostigmata
- Family: Celaenopsidae; Berlese, 1892

Family of mites

Celaenopsidae is a family of mites in the order Mesostigmata.

== Species ==
Celaenopsidae contains seven genera, with fourteen recognized species:

- Genus Schizocyrtillus Kinn, 1970
  - Schizocyrtillus josefinae Gwiazdowicz, 2002
  - Schizocyrtillus lathrus Kinn, 1970
  - Schizocyrtillus rarus Khaustov, 2000
- Genus Brachycelaenopsis Trägårdh, 1951
  - Brachycelaenopsis breviatus (Banks, 1916)
- Genus Celaenopsis Berlese, 1886
  - Celaenopsis andreinii Berlese, 1910
  - Celaenopsis badius (C.L. Koch, 1839)
  - Celaenopsis cuspidatus (Kramer, 1876)
  - Celaenopsis xinjiangensis Ma & Ye, in Ma, Liu & Ye 2003
- Genus Antennocelaeno Berlese, 1903
  - Antennocelaeno braunsi Wasman, 1902
- Genus Neocelaeno Berlese, 1910
  - Neocelaeno crytodonta (Berlese, 1901)
- Genus Pleuronectocelaeno Vitzthum, 1926
  - Pleuronectocelaeno austriaca Vitzthum, 1926
  - Pleuronectocelaeno barbara Athias Henriot, 1959
  - Pleuronectocelaeno japonica Kinn, 1991
- Genus Dinocelaeno Oudemans, 1936
  - Dinocelaeno gigas (Dugès, 1824)
