= Dithinozercon =

Scientific classification
- Kingdom: Animalia
- Phylum: Arthropoda
- Subphylum: Chelicerata
- Class: Arachnida
- Order: Mesostigmata
- Family: Dithinozerconidae
- Genus: Dithinozercon
- Species: D. halberti

Binomial name
- Dithinozercon halberti Ainscough, 1979

Family of mites

Dithinozerconidae is a monotypic family of mites in the order Mesostigmata. Its sole genus is Dithinozercon, which itself only contains a single species, Dithinozercon halberti.
