= Nothogynus =

Scientific classification
- Kingdom: Animalia
- Phylum: Arthropoda
- Subphylum: Chelicerata
- Class: Arachnida
- Order: Mesostigmata
- Suborder: Monogynaspida
- Infraorder: Uropodina
- Superfamily: Microgynioidea
- Family: Nothogynidae; Walter & Krantz, 1999
- Genus: Nothogynus; Walter & Krantz, 1999

Genus of mites

Nothogynus is a genus of mites placed in its own family, Nothogynidae, in the order Mesostigmata. Nothogynus contains two recognized species:

- Nothogynus camini Walter & Krantz, 1999
- Nothogynus klompeni Walter & Krantz, 1999
