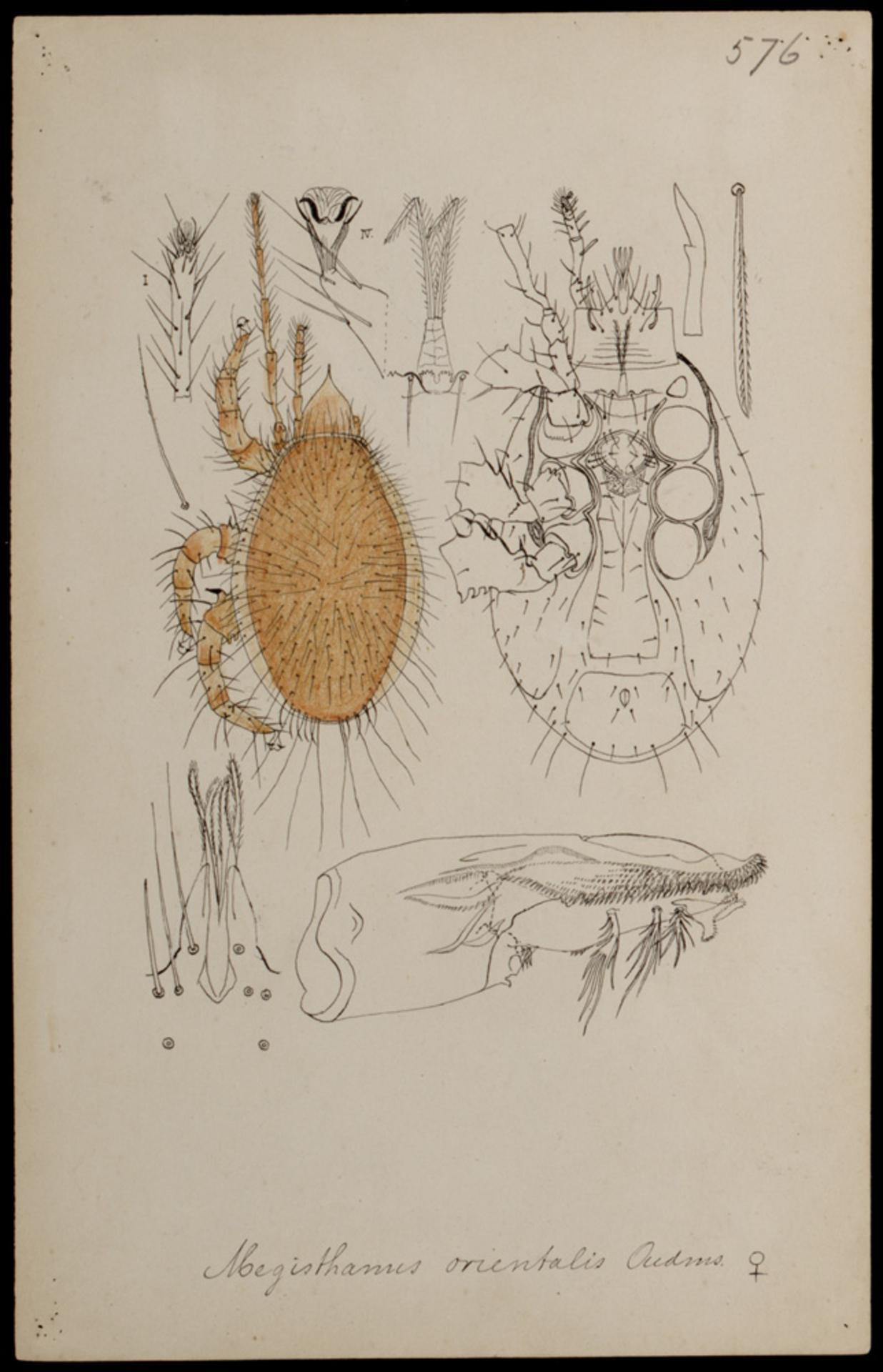
- Megisthanus

Scientific classification
- Domain: Eukaryota
- Kingdom: Animalia
- Phylum: Arthropoda
- Subphylum: Chelicerata
- Class: Arachnida
- Order: Mesostigmata
- Suborder: Trigynaspida
- Infraorder: Antennophorina

= Antennophorina =

Suborder of mites

Antennophorina is a suborder of mites in the order Mesostigmata. There are at least 4 families and more than 20 described species in Antennophorina.

== Families ==
These four families belong to the suborder Antennophorina:

- Antennophoridae
- Diplogyniidae
- Euzerconidae
- Megisthanidae
