= Protodinychus =

Scientific classification
- Kingdom: Animalia
- Phylum: Arthropoda
- Subphylum: Chelicerata
- Class: Arachnida
- Order: Mesostigmata
- Suborder: Monogynaspida
- Infraorder: Uropodina
- Superfamily: Thinozerconoidea
- Family: Protodinychidae; Evans, 1957
- Genus: Protodinychus; Evans, 1957

Family of mites

Protodinychidae is a small family of mites in the order Mesostigmata, containing the single genus Protodinychus.

== Species ==
Protodinychus comprises three recognised species:

- Protodinychus ainscoughi Hutu & Calugar, 2002
- Protodinychus evansi Hutu & Calugar, 2002
- Protodinychus punctatus Evans, 1957
