= Trigonuropodidae =

Scientific classification
- Kingdom: Animalia
- Phylum: Arthropoda
- Subphylum: Chelicerata
- Class: Arachnida
- Order: Mesostigmata
- Family: Trigonuropodidae; Hirschmann, in Wisniewski, 1979

Family of mites

Trigonuropodidae is a family of mites in the order Mesostigmata.

== Species ==
Trigonuropodidae contains one genus, with 80 recognized species:

- Genus Trigonuropoda Trägårdh, 1952
  - Trigonuropoda adatoi Hirschmann & Hiramatsu, 1990
  - Trigonuropoda afoveolata Hirschmann, 1975
  - Trigonuropoda aokii Hiramatsu, 1982
  - Trigonuropoda cruzi Hirschmann & Hiramatsu, 1990
  - Trigonuropoda crucistructura Hirschmann, 1975
  - Trigonuropoda crucistructuraoides Hirschmann, 1975
  - Trigonuropoda crucistructurasimilis Hirschmann, 1975
  - Trigonuropoda cubaandrassyia Hirschmann, 1975
  - Trigonuropoda cubabaloghia Hirschmann, 1975
  - Trigonuropoda cubaborhidüa Hirschmann, 1975
  - Trigonuropoda cubaendrodyia Hirschmann, 1975
  - Trigonuropoda cubahutuae Hirschmann, 1975
  - Trigonuropoda cubakaszabia Hirschmann, 1975
  - Trigonuropoda cubaloksaia Hirschmann, 1975
  - Trigonuropoda cubamahunkaia Hirschmann, 1975
  - Trigonuropoda cubanicolaea Hirschmann, 1975
  - Trigonuropoda cubapecinaia Hirschmann, 1975
  - Trigonuropoda cubazicsiia Hirschmann, 1975
  - Trigonuropoda difoveolata Hirschmann, 1975
  - Trigonuropoda eustructura Hirschmann, 1975
  - Trigonuropoda fimbriata Hiramatsu, 1981
  - Trigonuropoda garciai Hirschmann & Hiramatsu, 1990
  - Trigonuropoda hutuae Hirschmann, 1975
  - Trigonuropoda ishikawai Hirschmann & Hiramatsu, 1990
  - Trigonuropoda latipilis Hirschmann, 1975
  - Trigonuropoda leytensis Hirschmann & Hiramatsu, 1990
  - Trigonuropoda luzonensis Hirschmann & Hiramatsu, 1990
  - Trigonuropoda magnaporula Hirschmann, 1975
  - Trigonuropoda magnatuberculata HirsghmÑNn, 1975
  - Trigonuropoda mindanaoensis Hirschmann & Hiramatsu, 1990
  - Trigonuropoda modesta Hiramatsu, 1982
  - Trigonuropoda monofoveolata Hirschmann, 1975
  - Trigonuropoda monofoveolatasimilis Hiramatsu, 1981
  - Trigonuropoda multitricha Hirschmann, 1975
  - Trigonuropoda munda Hiramatsu & Hirschmann, 1983
  - Trigonuropoda nodosa Hirschmann & Hiramatsu, 1990
  - Trigonuropoda nonpolyphemus Hirschmann, 1975
  - Trigonuropoda neotrifoveolata Hirschmann, 1975
  - Trigonuropoda octotricha Hirschmann, 1975
  - Trigonuropoda okinawaensis Hiramatsu, 1979
  - Trigonuropoda palawanensis Hirschmann & Hiramatsu, 1990
  - Trigonuropoda polyphemus (Vitzthum, 1935)
  - Trigonuropoda polypora Hirschmann, 1975
  - Trigonuropoda pontina Hirschmann, 1975
  - Trigonuropoda quadritricha Hirschmann, 1975
  - Trigonuropoda rarosae Hirschmann & Hiramatsu, 1990
  - Trigonuropoda reticulata Hirschmann & Hiramatsu, 1990
  - Trigonuropoda sanguinea Hiramatsu & Hirschmann, 1977
  - Trigonuropoda sanguineasimilis Hirschmann & Hiramatsu, 1990
  - Trigonuropoda shcherbakae Hirschmann, 1975
  - Trigonuropoda schizostructura Hirschmann, 1975
  - Trigonuropoda schizostructurasimilis Hirschmann, 1975
  - Trigonuropoda shibai Hiramatsu, 1980
  - Trigonuropoda structura Hirschmann, 1975
  - Trigonuropoda terraereginae Domrow, 1957
  - Trigonuropoda terraereginaesimilis Hirschmann, 1975
  - Trigonuropoda traegardhi Hirschmann, 1975
  - Trigonuropoda trichoandrassyia Hirschmann, 1975
  - Trigonuropoda trichobaloghia Hirschmann, 1975
  - Trigonuropoda trichobaloghiasimilis Hirschmann, 1975
  - Trigonuropoda trichohalaskovaaea Hirschmann, 1975
  - Trigonuropoda trichokaszabia Hirschmann, 1975
  - Trigonuropoda tricholoksaia Hirschmann, 1975
  - Trigonuropoda trichomahunkaia Hirschmann, 1975
  - Trigonuropoda trichonicolaea Hirschmann, 1975
  - Trigonuropoda trichopecinaia Hirschmann, 1975
  - Trigonuropoda trichopontina Hirschmann, 1975
  - Trigonuropoda trichoshcherbakaea Hirschmann, 1975
  - Trigonuropoda trichotuberculata Hirschmann, 1975
  - Trigonuropoda trichowoelkeia Hirschmann, 1975
  - Trigonuropoda trichozicsiia Hirschmann, 1975
  - Trigonuropoda trioculata Hirschmann, 1975
  - Trigonuropoda trioculatasimilis Hirschmann, 1975
  - Trigonuropoda trifoveolata Hirschmann, 1975
  - Trigonuropoda tuberculata Hirschmann, 1975
  - Trigonuropoda trichotuberculataoides Hirschmann, 1975
  - Trigonuropoda tuberculatasimilis Hiramatsu, 1979
  - Trigonuropoda tuberosa Hirschmann, 1975
  - Trigonuropoda tuberosasimilis Hirschmann, 1975
  - Trigonuropoda ulugurensis Hiramatsu, 1981
