= Heatherella =

Scientific classification
- Kingdom: Animalia
- Phylum: Arthropoda
- Subphylum: Chelicerata
- Class: Arachnida
- Order: Mesostigmata
- Suborder: Monogynaspida
- Infraorder: Gamasina
- Superfamily: Heatherelloidea; Walter, 1997
- Family: Heatherellidae; Walter, 1997
- Genus: Heatherella; Walter, 1997

Genus of mites

Heatherella is a genus of mites placed in its own family, Heatherellidae, in the order Mesostigmata. Heatherella contains two recognized species:

- Heatherella acanthocharis Walter, 1997
- Heatherella callimaulos Walter, 1997
