= Epicriidae =

Scientific classification
- Kingdom: Animalia
- Phylum: Arthropoda
- Subphylum: Chelicerata
- Class: Arachnida
- Order: Mesostigmata
- Family: Epicriidae; Berlese, 1885

Family of mites

Epicriidae is a family of mites in the order Mesostigmata.

== Genera ==
Berlesiana Türk, 1943

- Berlesiana cirrata (Berlese, 1916)

Cornubia Türk, 1943

- Cornubia ornata Türk, 1943

Diepicrius Berlese, 1916

- Diepicrius parisiensis Berlese, 1916

Epicrius G. Canestrini & Fanzago, 1877

- Epicrius bregetovae Chelebiev, 1986
- Epicrius canestrinii (Haller, 1881)
- Epicrius dimentmani Iavorschi, 1995
- Epicrius heilongjiangensis Ma, 2003
- Epicrius hejianguoi Ma, 2003
- Epicrius kargi Solomon, 1978
- Epicrius magnus Solomon, 1985
- Epicrius mollis (Kramer, 1876)
- Epicrius omogoensis Ishikawa, 1987
- Epicrius parvituberculatus Ishikawa, 1987
- Epicrius schusteri Blaszak & Alberti, 1989
- Epicrius tauricus Bregetova, 1977
- Epicrius washingtonianus Berlese, 1885
- Epicrius minor Willmann, 1953
