= Arctacaridae =

Scientific classification
- Kingdom: Animalia
- Phylum: Arthropoda
- Subphylum: Chelicerata
- Class: Arachnida
- Order: Mesostigmata
- Infraorder: Gamasina
- Family: Arctacaridae; Evans, 1955

Family of mites

Arctacaridae is a small family of mites in the order Mesostigmata. These mites were discovered and described by Evans in 1955 in the arctic regions of North America.

== Species ==
Arctacaridae contains two genera, with six recognized species:

- Genus Arctacarus Evans, 1955
  - Arctacarus rostratus Evans, 1955
  - Arctacarus beringianus Bregetova, 1977
  - Arctacarus dzungaricus Bregetova, 1977
- Genus Proarctacarus Makarova, 2003
  - Proarctacarus canadensis Makarova, 2003
  - Proarctacarus johnstoni Makarova, 2003
  - Proarctacarus oregonensis Makarova, 2003
