= Coprozercon =

Scientific classification
- Kingdom: Animalia
- Phylum: Arthropoda
- Subphylum: Chelicerata
- Class: Arachnida
- Order: Mesostigmata
- Suborder: Monogynaspida
- Infraorder: Gamasina
- Superfamily: Zerconoidea
- Family: Coprozerconidae; Moraza & Lindquist, 1999
- Genus: Coprozercon; Moraza & Lindquist, 1999
- Species: C. scopaeus

Binomial name
- Coprozercon scopaeus Moraza & Lindquist, 1999

Genus of mites

Coprozercon scopaeus is a species of mite, placed in its own family, Coprozerconidae, in the order Mesostigmata. It was described in 1999 from the feces of the Allegheny woodrat, Neotoma magister, in a cave in Kentucky.
