= Dermanyssiae =

Dermanyssiae Temporal range: Palaeogene–present

Scientific classification
- Domain: Eukaryota
- Kingdom: Animalia
- Phylum: Arthropoda
- Subphylum: Chelicerata
- Class: Arachnida
- Order: Mesostigmata
- Suborder: Monogynaspida
- Infraorder: Gamasina
- Clade: Dermanyssiae

Superfamilies
- Ascoidea; Dermanyssoidea; Eviphidoidea; Rhodacaroidea; Veigaioidea

Group of mites

Dermanyssiae is a "sub-cohort" of mites.
