= Klinckowstroemiidae =

Scientific classification
- Kingdom: Animalia
- Phylum: Arthropoda
- Subphylum: Chelicerata
- Class: Arachnida
- Order: Mesostigmata
- Family: Klinckowstroemiidae

Family of mites

Klinckowstroemiidae is a family of mites in the order Mesostigmata.

== Species ==
Klinckowstroemiidae contains four genera, with 24 recognized species:

- Genus Antennurella Berlese, 1903
  - Antennurella tragardhi (Baker & Wharton, 1952)
  - Antennurella trouessarti Berlese, 1903
- Genus Klinckowstroemia Trägårdh, 1937
  - Klinckowstroemia atramaculata Rosario & Hunter, 1988
  - Klinckowstroemia candidoi Rosario & Hunter, 1988
  - Klinckowstroemia concava Hunter & Butler, 1966
  - Klinckowstroemia grabowskii Chernoff & Pope, 1970
  - Klinckowstroemia melissae Villegas-Guzman, Reyes-Castillo & Perez, 2011
  - Klinckowstroemia multisetillosa Rosario & Hunter, 1988
  - Klinckowstroemia oconnori Villegas-Guzman, Reyes-Castillo & Perez, 2011
  - Klinckowstroemia pennula Villegas-Guzman, Reyes-Castillo & Perez, 2011
  - Klinckowstroemia reyesi Rosario & Hunter, 1988
  - Klinckowstroemia schusteri Rosario & Hunter, 1988
  - Klinckowstroemia scotti Rosario & Hunter, 1988
  - Klinckowstroemia simplisetosa Rosario & Hunter, 1988
  - Klinckowstroemia starri Rosario & Hunter, 1988
  - Klinckowstroemia stilla Villegas-Guzman, Reyes-Castillo & Perez, 2011
  - Klinckowstroemia tapachulensis Chernoff & Pope, 1970
  - Klinckowstroemia tragardhi Baker & Wharton, 1952
  - Klinckowstroemia truncata Hunter & Butler, 1966
  - Klinckowstroemia victoriae Rosario & Hunter, 1988
- Genus Klinckowstroemiella Türk, 1951
  - Klinckowstroemiella prima Türk, 1951
  - Klinckowstroemiella trinidadis Wisniewski & Hirschmann, 1994
- Genus Similantennurella R. M. T. Rosario, 1988
  - Similantennurella spinata R. M. T. Rosario, 1988
  - Similantennurella aspinata Rosario, 1988
