= Saltiseiidae =

Scientific classification
- Kingdom: Animalia
- Phylum: Arthropoda
- Subphylum: Chelicerata
- Class: Arachnida
- Order: Mesostigmata
- Family: Saltiseiidae; Walter, 2000

Family of mites

Saltiseiidae is a family of mites in the order Mesostigmata.

== Species ==
Saltiseiidae contains one genus, with one recognized species:

- Genus Saltiseius Walter, 2000
  - Saltiseius hunteri Walter, 2000
