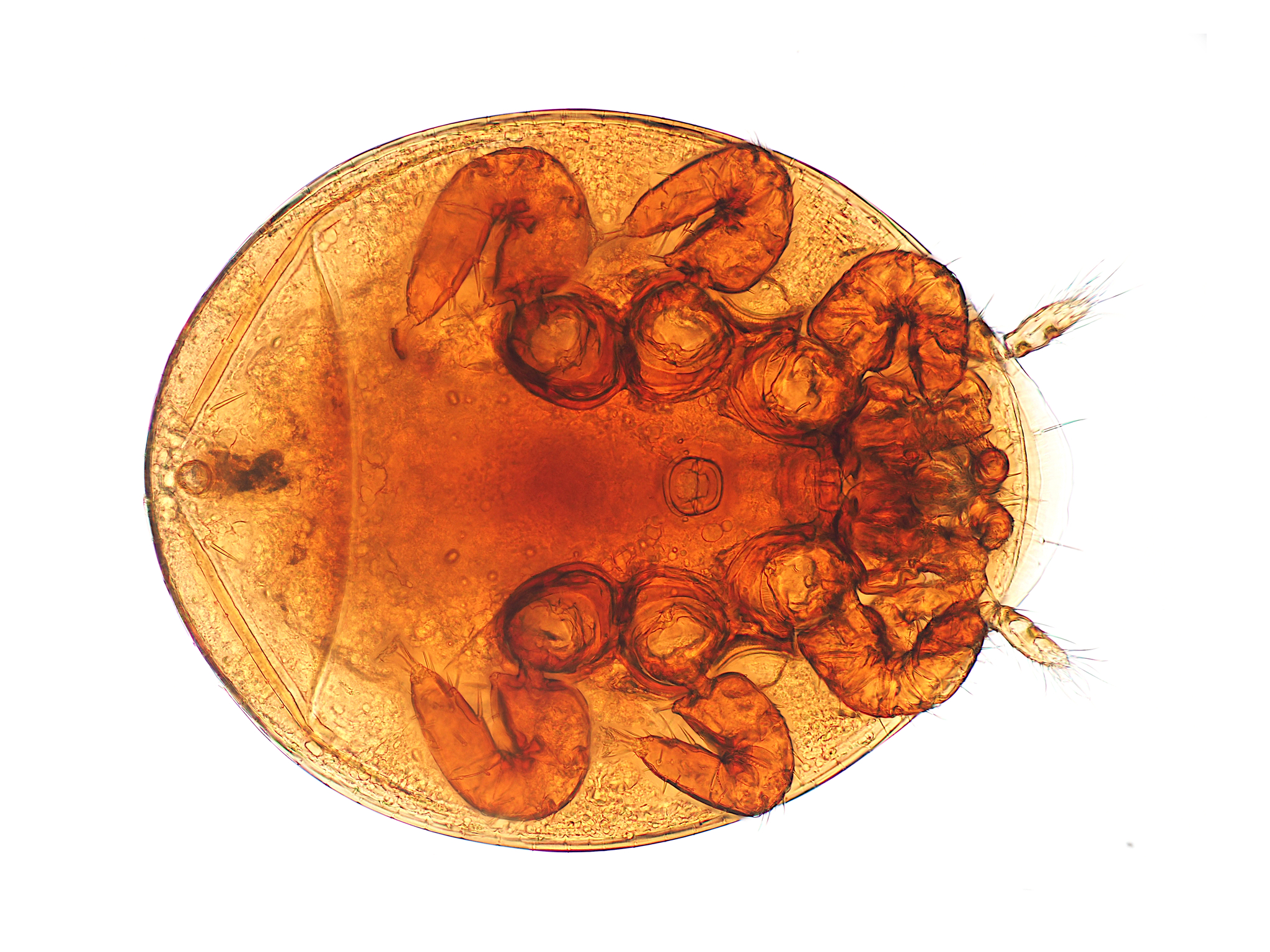
- Neofedrizzia canestrinii

Scientific classification
- Kingdom: Animalia
- Phylum: Arthropoda
- Subphylum: Chelicerata
- Class: Arachnida
- Order: Mesostigmata
- Genus: Fedrizziidae; Trägårdh, 1937

= Fedrizziidae =

Family of mites

Fedrizziidae is a family of mites in the order Mesostigmata.

== Species ==
Fedrizziidae contains thirty-one recognized species in three genera:

- Genus Fedrizzia G.Canestrini, 1884
  - Fedrizzia abradoalves Seeman, 2007
  - Fedrizzia bornemisszai Womersley, 1959
  - Fedrizzia derricki Womersley, 1959
  - Fedrizzia gilloglyi Seeman, 2007
  - Fedrizzia gloriosa Berlese, 1910
  - Fedrizzia grossipes G.Canestrini, 1884
  - Fedrizzia latus (Schweizer, 1956)
  - Fedrizzia oudemansi Womersley, 1959
  - Fedrizzia parvipilus Seeman, 2007
  - Fedrizzia sellnicki Womersley, 1959
  - Fedrizzia unospina Karg, 1997
- Genus Neofedrizzia Womersley, 1959
  - Neofedrizzia bicornis Karg, 1997
  - Neofedrizzia brooksi Womersley, 1959
  - Neofedrizzia bunyas Seeman, 2007
  - Neofedrizzia camini Womersley, 1959
  - Neofedrizzia canestrinii Womersley, 1959
  - Neofedrizzia cynota Womersley, 1959
  - Neofedrizzia gayi Womersley, 1959
  - Neofedrizzia gordoni Seeman, 2007
  - Neofedrizzia gorirossiae Womersley, 1959
  - Neofedrizzia helenae Seeman, 2007
  - Neofedrizzia imparmentum Seeman, 2007
  - Neofedrizzia janae Seeman, 2007
  - Neofedrizzia laevis (Canestrini, 1884)
  - Neofedrizzia leonilae Rosario & Hunter, 1984
  - Neofedrizzia lepas Seeman, 2007
  - Neofedrizzia sulawesi Seeman, 2007
  - Neofedrizzia tani Pope & Chernoff, 1979
  - Neofedrizzia tragardhi Womersley, 1959
  - Neofedrizzia vidua Womersley, 1959
- Genus Parafedrizzia Womersley, 1959
  - Parafedrizzia buloloensis Womersley, 1959
