= Seiodidae =

Scientific classification
- Kingdom: Animalia
- Phylum: Arthropoda
- Subphylum: Chelicerata
- Class: Arachnida
- Order: Mesostigmata
- Family: Seiodidae; Kethley, 1977

Family of mites

Seiodidae is a family of mites in the order Mesostigmata.

== Species ==
Seiodidae contains one genus, with two recognized species:

- Genus Seiodes Berlese, 1887
  - Seiodes histricinus Berlese, 1892
  - Seiodes ursinus Berlese, 1887
