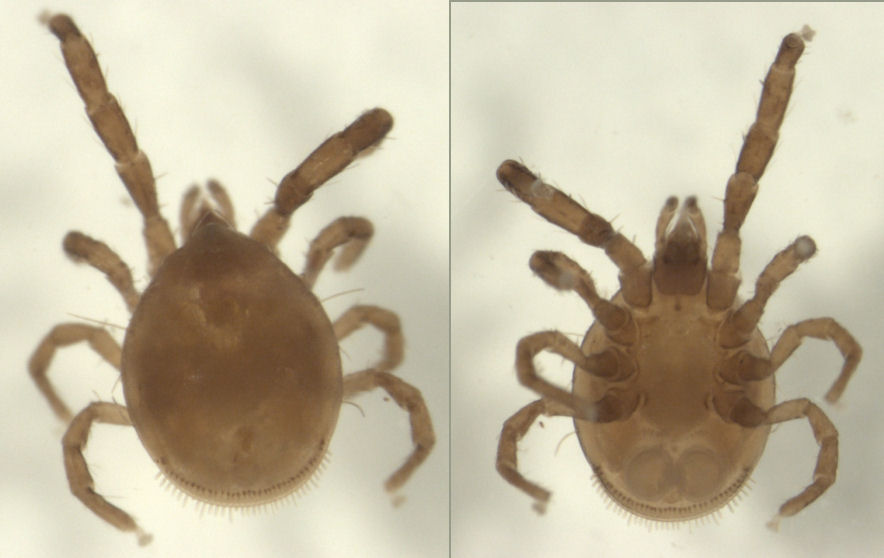
- Berzercon ferdinandi (male)

Scientific classification
- Kingdom: Animalia
- Phylum: Arthropoda
- Subphylum: Chelicerata
- Class: Arachnida
- Order: Mesostigmata
- Superfamily: Heterozerconoidea
- Family: Discozerconidae; Berlese, 1910

= Discozerconidae =

Family of mites

Discozerconidae is a small family of mites in the order Mesostigmata.

== Species ==
Discozerconidae contains three genera, with four recognized species:

- Genus Berzercon Seeman & Baker, 2013
  - Berzercon ferdinandi Seeman & Baker, 2013
- Genus Discozercon Berlese, 1910
  - Discozercon derricki Domrow, 1956
  - Discozercon mirabilis Berlese, 1910
- Genus Discomegistus Trägårdh, 1911
  - Discomegistus pectinatus Trägårdh, 1911
