= Asternoseiidae =

Scientific classification
- Kingdom: Animalia
- Phylum: Arthropoda
- Subphylum: Chelicerata
- Class: Arachnida
- Order: Mesostigmata
- Family: Asternoseiidae; Valle, 1955

Family of mites

Asternoseiidae is a family of mites in the order Mesostigmata.

== Species ==
Asternoseiidae contains one genus, with one recognized species:

- Genus Asternoseius Berlese, 1910
  - Asternoseius ciliatus Berlese, 1910
