= Philodanidae =

Scientific classification
- Kingdom: Animalia
- Phylum: Arthropoda
- Subphylum: Chelicerata
- Class: Arachnida
- Order: Mesostigmata
- Family: Philodanidae; Kethley, 1977

Family of mites

Philodanidae is a family of mites in the order Mesostigmata.

== Taxonomy ==
- Afrophilodana
  - Afrophilodana africana
- Philodana
  - Philodana johnstoni
