= Megacelaenopsidae =

Scientific classification
- Kingdom: Animalia
- Phylum: Arthropoda
- Subphylum: Chelicerata
- Class: Arachnida
- Order: Mesostigmata
- Family: Megacelaenopsidae; Funk, 1975

Family of mites

Megacelaenopsidae is a family of mites in the order Mesostigmata.

== Species ==
Megacelaenopsidae contains two genera, with two recognized species:

- Genus Megacelaenopsis Funk, 1975
  - Megacelaenopsis oudemansi Funk, 1975
- Genus Pelorocelaenopsis Funk, 1975
  - Pelorocelaenopsis camini Funk, 1975
