= Davacaridae =

Scientific classification
- Kingdom: Animalia
- Phylum: Arthropoda
- Subphylum: Chelicerata
- Class: Arachnida
- Order: Mesostigmata
- Family: Davacaridae; Kethley, 1977

Family of mites

Davacaridae is a family of mites in the order Mesostigmata.

== Species ==
Davacaridae contains one genus, with one recognized species:

- Genus Davacarus Hunter, in Gressitt 1970
  - Davacarus gressitti Hunter, in Gressitt 1970
