= Schizogyniidae =

Scientific classification
- Kingdom: Animalia
- Phylum: Arthropoda
- Subphylum: Chelicerata
- Class: Arachnida
- Order: Mesostigmata
- Family: Schizogyniidae; Trägårdh, 1950

Family of mites

Schizogyniidae is a family of mites in the order Mesostigmata.

== Species ==
Schizogyniidae contains six genera, with six recognized species:

- Genus Fusura Valle & Fox, 1966
  - Fusura civica Valle & Fox, 1966
- Genus Choriarchus Kinn, 1966
  - Choriarchus reginus Kinn, 1966
- Genus Indogynium Sellnick, 1954
  - Indogynium lindbergi Sellnick, 1954
- Genus Mixogynium Ryke, 1957
  - Mixogynium proteae Ryke, 1957
- Genus Paraschizogynium P. E. Hunter & R. M. T. Rosario, 1987
  - Paraschizogynium odontokeri P. E. Hunter & R. M. T. Rosario, 1987
- Genus Schizogynium Karg 1997
  - Schizogynium forcipis Karg, 1997
