= Cercomegistidae =

Scientific classification
- Kingdom: Animalia
- Phylum: Arthropoda
- Subphylum: Chelicerata
- Class: Arachnida
- Order: Mesostigmata
- Family: Cercomegistidae; Trägårdh, 1937

Family of mites

Cercomegistidae is a family of mites in the order Mesostigmata.

== Species ==
Cercomegistidae contains four genera, with six recognized species:

- Genus Celaenogamasus Berlese, 1901
  - Celaenogamasus hirtellus Berlese, 1901
- Genus Cercoleipus D.N.Kinn, 1970
  - Cercoleipus coelonotus D.N.Kinn, 1970
- Genus Cercomegistus Berlese, 1914
  - Cercomegistus abires Domrow, 1976
  - Cercomegistus bruckianus Berlese, 1914
  - Cercomegistus varaderoensis Wisniewski & Hirschmann, in Hirschmann & Wisniewski 1994
- Genus Vitzthumegistus Kethley, 1977
  - Vitzthumegistus paguroxenus (André, 1937)
