= Neotenogyniidae =

Scientific classification
- Kingdom: Animalia
- Phylum: Arthropoda
- Subphylum: Chelicerata
- Class: Arachnida
- Order: Mesostigmata
- Family: Neotenogyniidae; Kethley, 1974

Family of mites

Neotenogyniidae is a family of mites in the order Mesostigmata.

== Species ==
Neotenogyniidae contains two genera, with two recognized species:

- Genus Neotenogynium Kethley, 1974
  - Neotenogynium malkini Kethley, 1974
- Genus Sternoseius Balough, 1963
  - Sternoseius argentinensis Balough, 1963
