= Messoracaridae =

Scientific classification
- Kingdom: Animalia
- Phylum: Arthropoda
- Subphylum: Chelicerata
- Class: Arachnida
- Order: Mesostigmata
- Family: Messoracaridae; Kethley, 1977

Family of mites

Messoracaridae is a family of mites in the order Mesostigmata.

== Taxonomy ==
- Genus Leptantennus Berlese, 1916
  - Leptantennus pendulipes Berlese, 1916
- Genus Messoracarus Silvestri, 1912
  - Messoracarus emarginatus (Banks, 1916)
  - Messoracarus mirandus Silvestri, 1912
