= Antennophoridae =

Scientific classification
- Kingdom: Animalia
- Phylum: Arthropoda
- Subphylum: Chelicerata
- Class: Arachnida
- Order: Mesostigmata
- Family: Antennophoridae; Berlese, 1892

Family of mites

Antennophoridae is a family of mites in the order Mesostigmata.

== Genera ==
Antennophoridae contains five genera, with nine recognized species. Antennophorus grandis is an ectoparasite on ants of the species Lasius flavus.

- Antennophorus Haller, 1877
- Echinomegistus Berlese, 1903
- Antennomegistus Berlese, 1903
- Celaenosthanus Vitzthum, 1930
- Neomegistus Trägårdh, 1906
