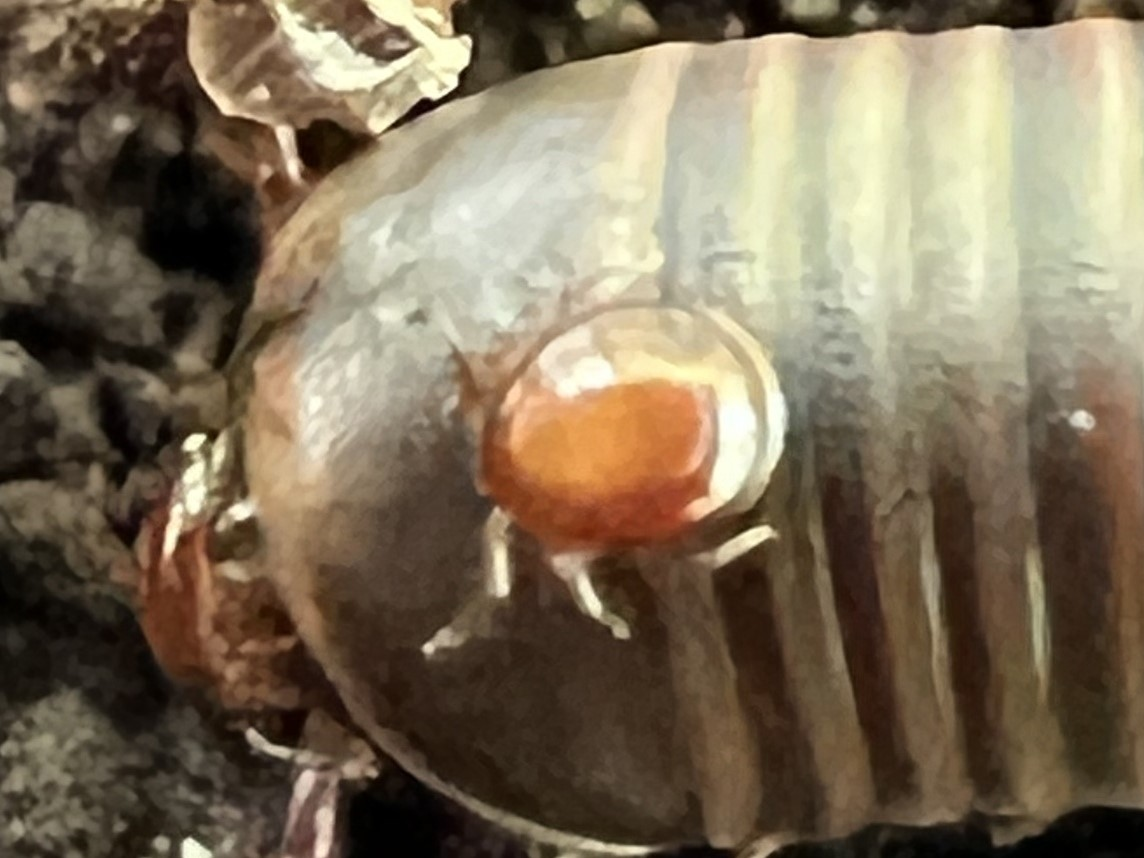
- Narceoheterozercon sp.

Scientific classification
- Kingdom: Animalia
- Phylum: Arthropoda
- Subphylum: Chelicerata
- Class: Arachnida
- Order: Mesostigmata
- Family: Heterozerconidae; Berlese, 1892

= Heterozerconidae =

Family of mites

Heterozerconidae is a family of mites in the order Mesostigmata.

== Species ==
Heterozerconidae contains nine genera, with 15 recognized species:

- Genus Afroheterozercon Fain, 1989
  - Afroheterozercon spirostreptus (Fain, 1988)
  - Afroheterozercon cautus (Berlese, 1924)
  - Afroheterozercon pachybolus (Fain, 1988)
  - Afroheterozercon ancoratus Fain, 1989
  - Afroheterozercon mahsbergi Klompen, Amin & Gerdeman, 2013
  - Afroheterozercon sanghae Klompen, Amin & Gerdeman, 2013
  - Afroheterozercon gabonensis Klompen, Amin & Gerdeman, 2013
  - Afroheterozercon goodmani Klompen, Amin & Gerdeman, 2013
  - Afroheterozercon tanzaniensis Klompen, Amin & Gerdeman, 2013
  - Afroheterozercon madagascariensis Klompen, Amin & Gerdeman, 2013
- Genus Allozercon Vitzthum, 1926
  - Allozercon audax (Berlese, 1910)
  - Allozercon fecundissimus Vitzthum, 1926
- Genus Amheterozercon Fain, 1989
  - Amheterozercon oudemansi (Finnegan, 1931)
- Genus Atacoseius Berlese, 1905
  - Atacoseius pellucens Berlese, 1905
- Genus Heterozercon Berlese, 1888
  - Heterozercon degeneratus Berlese, 1888
  - Heterozercon microsuctus Fain, 1989
  - Heterozercon spirostreptus Fain, 1988
- Genus Maracazercon Fain, 1989
  - Maracazercon joliveti Fain, 1989
- Genus Narceoheterozercon Gerdeman & Klompen, 2003
  - Narceoheterozercon ohioensis Gerdeman & Klompen, 2003
- Genus Philippinozercon Gerdeman, Garcia, Herczak & Klompen, 2018
  - Philippinozercon makilingensis Gerdeman, Garcia, Herczak & Klompen, 2018
- Genus Zeterohercon C. H. W. Flechtmann & D. E. Johnston, 1990
  - Zeterohercon amphisbaenae C. H. W. Flechtmann & D. E. Johnston, 1990
  - Zeterohercon elegans (Lizaso, 1981)
  - Zeterohercon oudemansi (Finnegan, 1931)
