= Hoplomegistidae =

Scientific classification
- Kingdom: Animalia
- Phylum: Arthropoda
- Subphylum: Chelicerata
- Class: Arachnida
- Order: Mesostigmata
- Family: Hoplomegistidae

Family of mites

Hoplomegistidae is a family of mites in the order Mesostigmata.

== Species ==
Hoplomegistidae contains one genus, with two recognized species:

- Genus Stenosternum Kramer, 1898
  - Stenosternum armiger (Berlese, 1888)
  - Stenosternum bipilosum Kramer, 1898
