= Costacaridae =

Scientific classification
- Kingdom: Animalia
- Phylum: Arthropoda
- Subphylum: Chelicerata
- Class: Arachnida
- Order: Mesostigmata
- Family: Costacaridae; P. E. Hunter, 1993

Family of mites

Costacaridae is a family of mites in the order Mesostigmata.

== Species ==
Costacaridae contains one genus, with one recognized species:

- Genus Costacarus P. E. Hunter, 1993
  - Costacarus reyesi P. E. Hunter, 1993
