= Pyrosejidae =

Scientific classification
- Kingdom: Animalia
- Phylum: Arthropoda
- Subphylum: Chelicerata
- Class: Arachnida
- Order: Mesostigmata
- Family: Pyrosejidae; E. E. Lindquist & M. L. Moraza, 1993

Family of mites

Pyrosejidae is a family of mites in the order Mesostigmata.

== Taxonomy ==
- Pyroseiulus
  - Pyroseiulus kethleyi
- Pyrosejus
  - Pyrosejus prionotus
  - Pyrosejus verticis
