= Triplogyniidae =

Scientific classification
- Kingdom: Animalia
- Phylum: Arthropoda
- Subphylum: Chelicerata
- Class: Arachnida
- Order: Mesostigmata
- Family: Triplogyniidae; Funk, 1977

Family of mites

Triplogyniidae is a family of mites in the order Mesostigmata.

== Species ==
Triplogyniidae contains two genera, with ten recognized species:

- Genus Funkotriplogynium A. Kumar-Datta, 1985
  - Funkotriplogynium bengalensis (Pramanik & Raychaudhuri, 1979)
  - Funkotriplogynium iagobadius Seeman & Walter, 1997
  - Funkotriplogynium irapora (Flechtmann, 1983)
  - Funkotriplogynium ovulum (Berlese, 1904)
  - Funkotriplogynium sisiri A. Kumar-Datta, 1985
  - Funkotriplogynium valei (Fox, 1959)
- Genus Triplogynium Funk, 1977
  - Triplogynium hirtellus (Berlese, 1916)
  - Triplogynium indicum Pramanik & Raychaudhuri, 1980
  - Triplogynium krantzi Funk, 1977
  - Triplogynium ligniphilum Wisniewski & Hirschmann, 1993
