= Paramegistidae =

Scientific classification
- Kingdom: Animalia
- Phylum: Arthropoda
- Subphylum: Chelicerata
- Class: Arachnida
- Order: Mesostigmata
- Family: Paramegistidae; Trägårdh, 1946

Family of mites

Paramegistidae is a family of mites in the order Mesostigmata.

== Species ==
Paramegistidae contains four genera, with 21 recognized species:

- Genus Meristomegistus Kim & Klompen, 2002
  - Meristomegistus vazquezus Kim & Klompen, 2002
- Genus Ophiomegistus Banks, 1914
  - Ophiomegistus alainae Goff, 1980
  - Ophiomegistus armouri Goff, 1979
  - Ophiomegistus australicus (Womersely, 1958)
  - Ophiomegistus blumi Domrow, 1984
  - Ophiomegistus brennani Goff, 1980
  - Ophiomegistus clelandi Womersley, 1958
  - Ophiomegistus iriani Domrow, 1984
  - Ophiomegistus joppae Domrow, 1984
  - Ophiomegistus kaii Goff, 1979
  - Ophiomegistus keithi Domrow, 1978
  - Ophiomegistus luzonensis Banks, 1914
  - Ophiomegistus maximus Goff, 1980
  - Ophiomegistus nihi Goff, 1980
  - Ophiomegistus novaguinea Goff, 1980
  - Ophiomegistus radovskyi Goff, 1979
  - Ophiomegistus samuelsoni Goff, 1979
  - Ophiomegistus sarawakensis Goff, 1980
  - Ophiomegistus spectabilis Klompen & Austin, 2007
- Genus Paramegistus Trägårdh, 1906
  - Paramegistus confrater Trägårdh, 1906
- Genus Pseudomegistus Kethley, 1977
  - Pseudomegistus australis (Banks, 1916)
