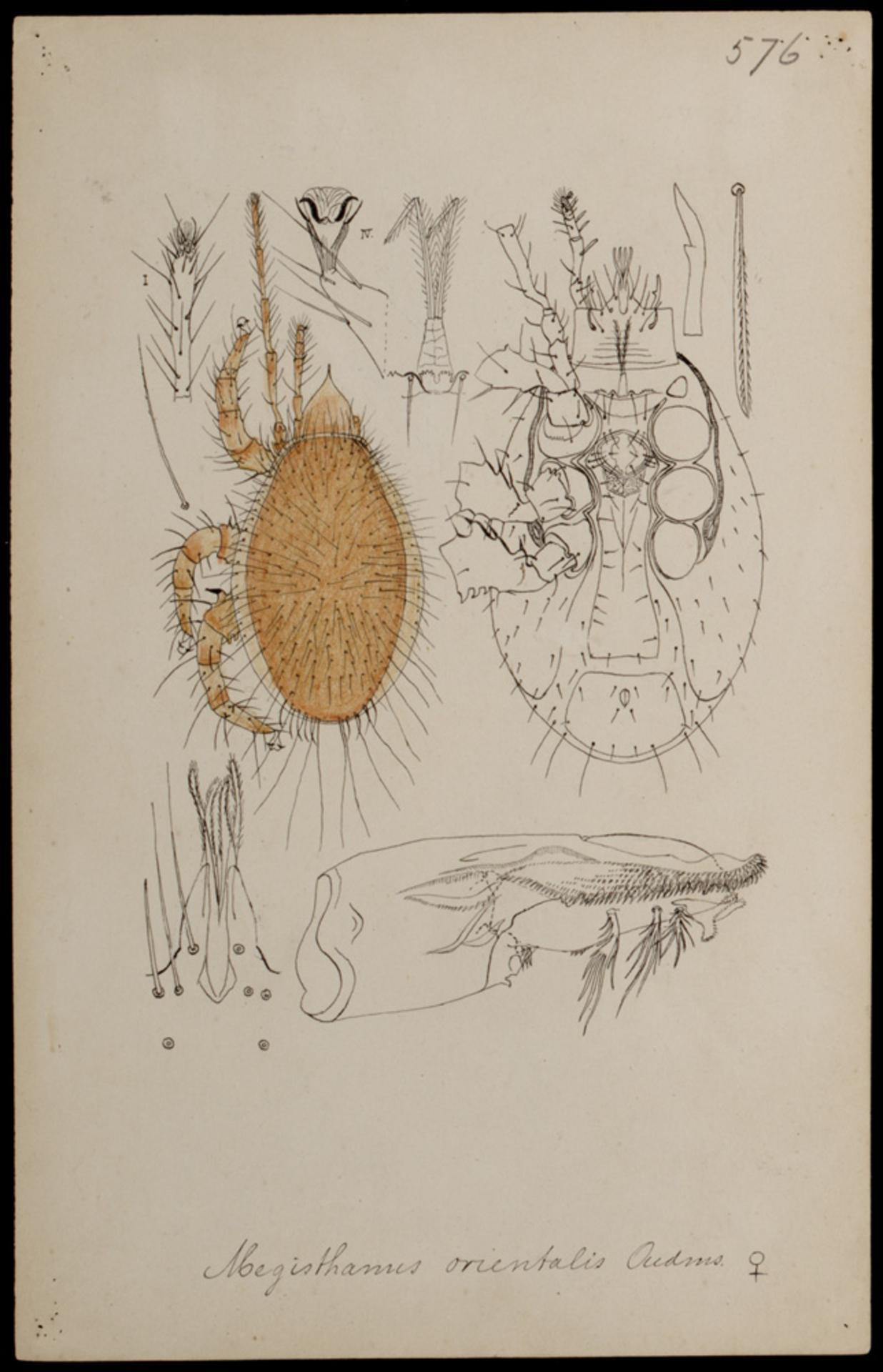
- Megisthanus

Scientific classification
- Kingdom: Animalia
- Phylum: Arthropoda
- Subphylum: Chelicerata
- Class: Arachnida
- Order: Mesostigmata
- Superfamily: Megisthanoidea
- Family: Megisthanidae; Berlese, 1914

= Megisthanidae =

Family of mites

Megisthanidae is a family of mites in the order Mesostigmata. It contains 26 currently recognised species, including the largest known Mesostigmata. There is at least one genus, Megisthanus, in Megisthanidae.
