= Euzerconidae =

Scientific classification
- Kingdom: Animalia
- Phylum: Arthropoda
- Subphylum: Chelicerata
- Class: Arachnida
- Order: Mesostigmata
- Family: Euzerconidae; Trägårdh, 1938

Family of mites

Euzerconidae is a family of mites in the order Mesostigmata.

== Species ==
Euzerconidae contains twelve genera, with 20 recognized species:

- Genus Euzercon Berlese, 1888
  - Euzercon anatonon Hunter & Rosario, 1991
  - Euzercon balzani Berlese, 1888
  - Euzercon brachys Hunter & Rosario, 1991
  - Euzercon brasiliensis Wisniewski & Hirschmann, 1992
  - Euzercon dolichos Hunter & Rosario, 1991
  - Euzercon hyatti Hunter & Rosario, 1991
  - Euzercon latus (Banks, 1909)
  - Euzercon subtermion Hunter & Rosario, 1991
- Genus Etazercon P. E. Hunter & R. M. T. Rosario, 1989
  - Etazercon starri P. E. Hunter & R. M. T. Rosario, 1989
- Genus Euzerconiella J. Wisniewski & W. Hirschmann, 1992
  - Euzerconiella ghanae J. Wisniewski & W. Hirschmann, 1992
- Genus Euzerconoides R. C. Funk, 1980
  - Euzerconoides eta R. C. Funk, 1980
  - Euzerconoides columbiensis Wisniewski & Hirschmann, 1992
- Genus Karkinoeuzercon R. C. Funk, 1980
  - Karkinoeuzercon epsilon R. C. Funk, 1980
- Genus Microeuzercon R.C.Funk, 1976
  - Microeuzercon alpha R.C.Funk, 1976
- Genus Neoeuzercon R. C. Funk, 1980
  - Neoeuzercon diplopodophilus R. C. Funk, 1980
- Genus Paraeuzercon R. C. Funk, 1980
  - Paraeuzercon delta R. C. Funk, 1980
- Genus Pseudoeuzercon R. C. Funk, 1980
  - Pseudoeuzercon seeversi R. C. Funk, 1980
- Genus Synaptoeuzercon R. C. Funk, 1980
  - Synaptoeuzercon zeta R. C. Funk, 1980
- Genus Trichotoeuzercon R. C. Funk, 1980
  - Trichotoeuzercon nu R. C. Funk, 1980
- Genus Trinizercon P. E. Hunter & R. M. T. Rosario, 1989
  - Trinizercon atyeoi P. E. Hunter & R. M. T. Rosario, 1989
