= Antonio Berlese =

Italian entomologist (1863-1927)

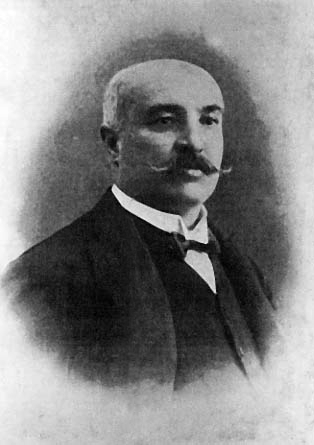
Antonio Berlese

Antonio Berlese (26 June 1863, in Padua, Austrian Empire – 24 October 1927, in Florence) was an Italian entomologist.

== Career ==
Berlese worked on pest insects notably of fruit trees. He published over 300 articles and a book Gli insetti loro organizzazione, sviluppo, abitudini e rapporti con l’uomo (in two volumes, 1909 and 1925); also a series entitled Acari, Myriapoda et Scorpiones hucusque in Italie reperta which appeared in 101 numbers between 1882 et 1903 and which contained over 1,000 figures by Berlese himself. With Gustavo Leonardi he issued the exsiccata series Chermotheca Italica (1895–1909). Berlese was a specialist in Hemiptera Coccoidea. Later on Berlese offered the microscopic slide series Acarotheca Italica for sale.

With his brother, Augusto Napoleone Berlese (1864–1903), a plant and mushroom disease specialist, he founded the Revista di Patologia vegetale in 1892. In 1899, he became Director of the Istituto Sperimentale per la Zoologia Agraria.

In 1903 he founded the review Redia, which he edited until his death. This publication promoted zoological studies in agriculture, forestry, and in urban contexts, with an emphasis on entomology, acarology and nematology. The aim was to increase taxonomic knowledge of groups with pest species.

== Berlese funnel ==
In 1905, Berlese described an apparatus used to extract small creatures from soil for examination. The funnel device has been adapted in numerous ways, but varieties of funnel are still used today.

== Legacy ==
There are roads named after Berlese in Padua, Milan, Bergamo, Treviso and Monte Migliore-la Selvotta.

== Works ==
Partial publication list for 1896 giving an idea of his output.

- Le cocciniglie Italiane viventi sugli agrumi. Parte II. I. Lecanium. Riv. Patol. Veget. 3: 49–100(1896).
- with Leonardi, G. Diagnosi di cocciniglie nuove. Riv. Patol. Veget. 4: 345–352 (1896).
- with Leonardi, G. Diagnosi di cocciniglie nuove. Riv. Patol. Veget. 4: 1–352 (1896).
- with Leonardi, G. Le cocciniglie Italiane viventi sugli argumi. Parte III. I Diaspiti. [Cap. I. Note di sistematica e descrizione delle specie.] Riv. Patol. Veget. 4: 74–170 (1896).
- with Leonardi, G. Diagnosi di cocciniglie nuove. Riv. Patol. Veget. 4: 345–352 (1896).
