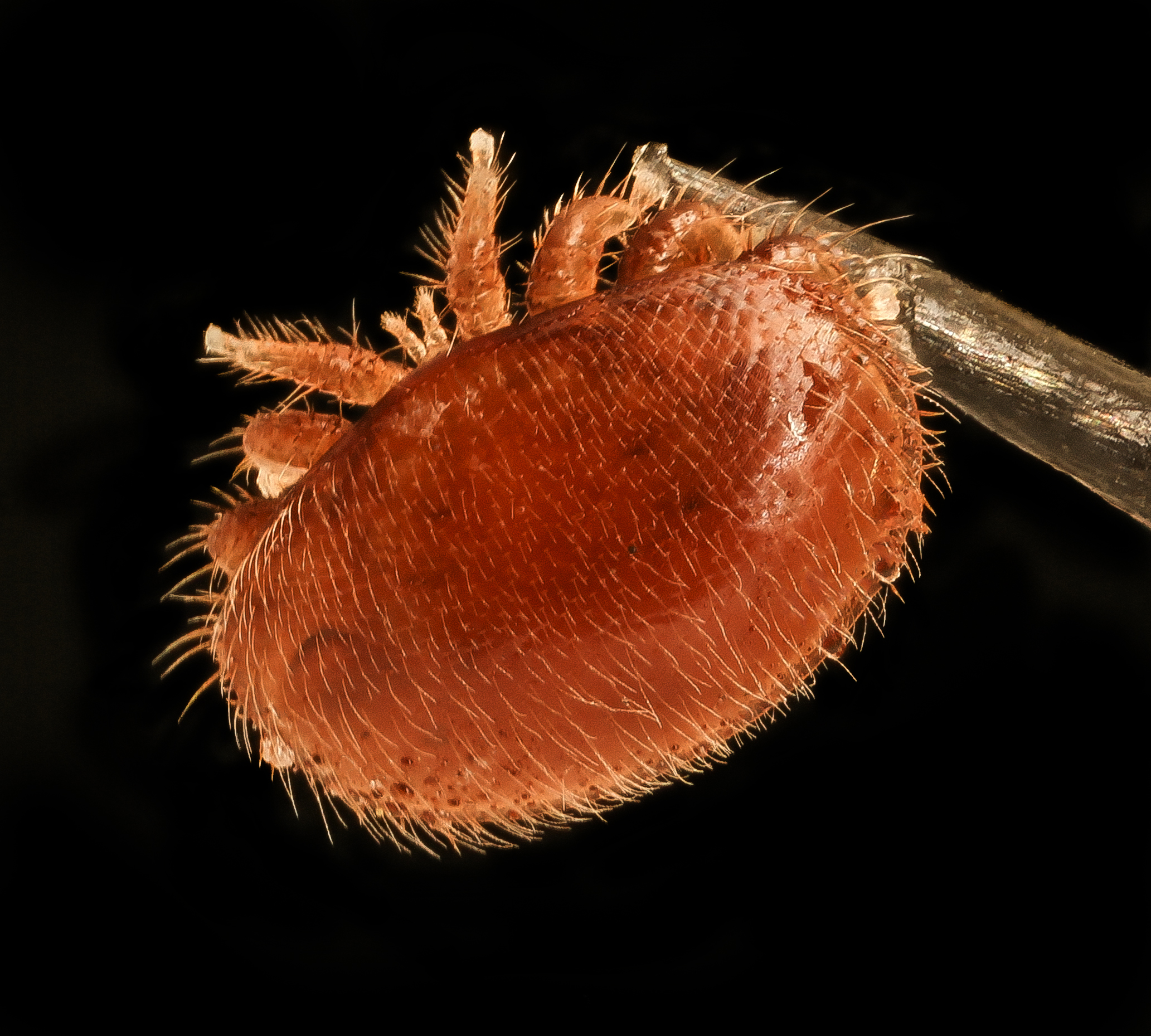
- Varroa destructor
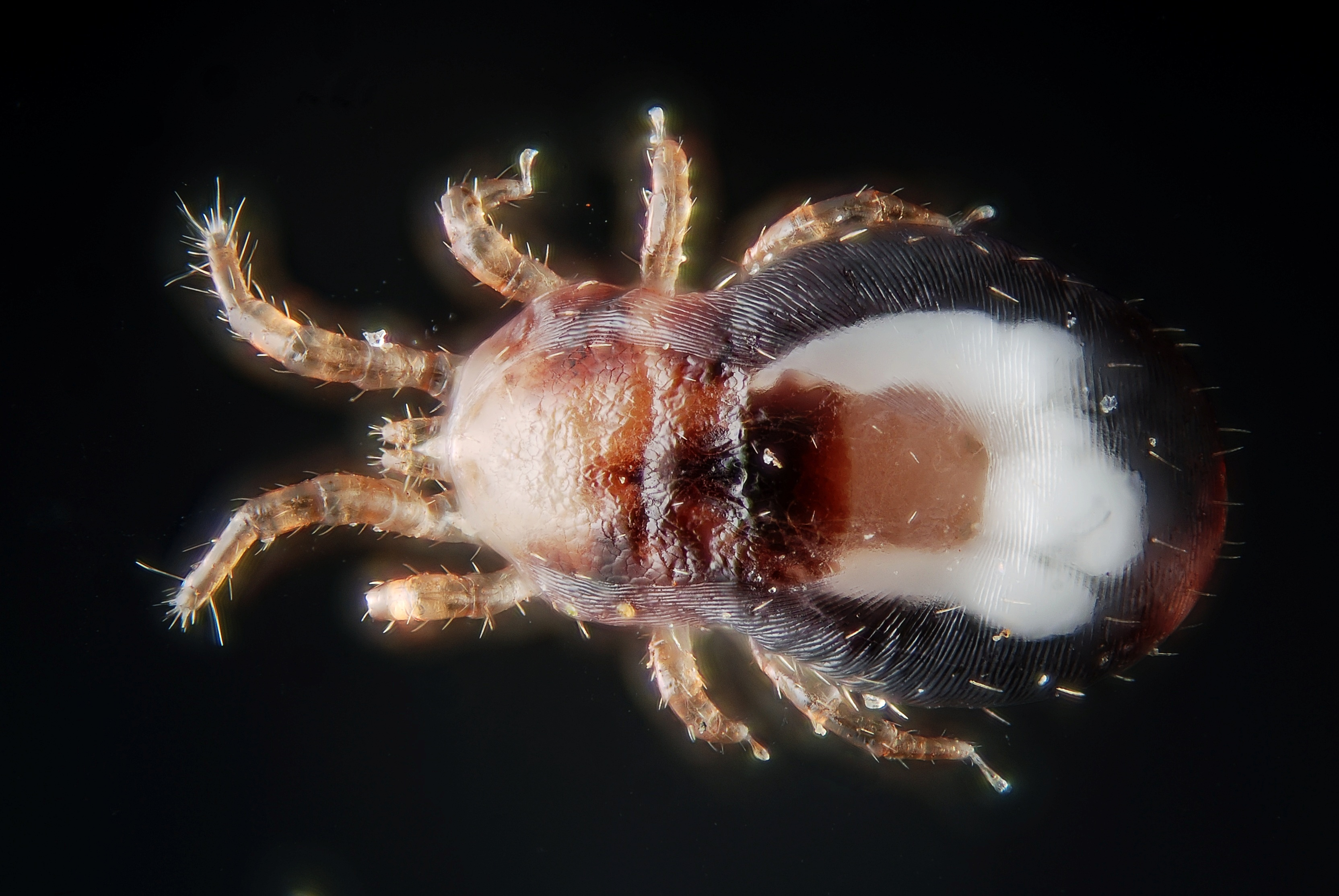
- Dermanyssus gallinae

Scientific classification
- Kingdom: Animalia
- Phylum: Arthropoda
- Subphylum: Chelicerata
- Class: Arachnida
- Superorder: Parasitiformes
- Order: Mesostigmata

Suborders
- Monogynaspida Camin & Gorirossi, 1955; Sejida Kramer, 1885; Trigynaspida Camin & Gorirossi, 1955

Diversity
- about 130 families, 900 genera, > 8,000 species

= Mesostigmata =

Mesostigmata Temporal range: Cenomanian–present

Order of mites

Mesostigmata is an order of mites belonging to the Parasitiformes. They are by far the largest group of Parasitiformes, with over 8,000 species in 130 families. Mesostigmata includes parasitic as well as free-living and predatory forms. They can be recognized by the single pair of spiracles positioned laterally on the body.

The family with the most described species is Phytoseiidae. Other families of note are Diplogyniidae, Macrochelidae, Pachylaelapidae, Uropodidae and Veigaiidae.

Amongst the best known species are Varroa destructor, an economically important parasite of honey bees, as well as the red mite (Dermanyssus gallinae), a parasite of poultry, most commonly chickens.

== Description ==
Mesostigmata are mites ranging from 0.12–4 mm long (0.2–4 mm according to another source). They have a pair of stigmatal openings above legs III–IV usually associated with a peritrematal groove. The gnathosoma has a sclerotised ring around the bases of the chelicerae (basis capitulum). The palps have five (rarely four) free segments and usually a subdistal palp apotele. The chelicerae are three segmented. The subcapitulum usually has a median groove with transverse rows of one to many denticles. There are usually bifurcate or membranous corniculi present. Except in some parasitic species, a flagellate tritosternum is present. The coxae of the legs are freely articulating with the body. The intercoxal region has sternal and genital shield elements. Adults have a genital opening and either chelicerae modified for sperm transfer (if male) or a sperm-receiving structure (if female).

The above description applies to adults. Larvae have six legs, instead of the eight possessed by later stages, and may or may not feed. There are two nymphal stages (protonymph, deutonymph) that usually have lightly sclerotized dorsal, intercoxal and ventral plates.

== Ecology ==
Many Mesostigmata are free-living predators of invertebrates that live in soil and litter, on the soil surface or on plants. There are also some that live in freshwater. Other Mesostigmata are parasites of vertebrates or arthropods, pollen and nectar feeders in flowers, fungus feeders, or saprophages that subsist on dead or decaying organic matter.

The soil-dwelling Mesostigmata are not as abundant as oribatids or prostigmatids that also occur in this habitat, but they are still ubiquitous in soil and may be important predators. Larger species tend to be predators of small arthropods or arthropod eggs, whereas smaller species prey on nematodes. Size of these mesostigmatans decreases with soil depth: plant litter and humus have large species such as Veigaia (Veigaiidae), the humus-soil interface has smaller species like Dendrolaelaps (Digamasellidae) and the mineral soil has the tiny Rhodacarellus (Rhodacaridae).

A few species are known from freshwater habitats, such as wet soil, phytotelmata, waterside vegetation and sewage filter-beds. These appear to move by crawling as no species are known to swim. Some species are known to prey on mosquito eggs and one species was reared on a diet of nematodes.

The parasitic Mesostigmata are mostly in superfamily Dermanyssoidea. These include parasites of invertebrates (e.g. Varroidae) and of vertebrates (other families), as well as both ectoparasites (external) and endoparasites (internal).

Phoresy, the temporary attachment of a smaller animal to a larger one for travel, is common in the Mesostigmata. For example, the freshwater species are phoretic on flies of families Tipulidae, Ceratopogonidae, and Culicidae.

== Economic importance ==
Varroa destructor (Varroidae) is a major pest of honey bees. It harms bees both directly by feeding on fat body tissue, and indirectly by transmitting viruses.

Similarly, the red mite (Dermanyssus gallinae) feeds on the blood of birds, including poultry (chickens, turkeys, ducks) and wild birds. It reduces animal health, welfare and production.

In agriculture, soil-dwelling mesostigmatans are important predators of nematodes, springtails and insect larvae, while plant-dwelling mesostigmatans control pests such as spider mites.

== Evolution ==
The oldest known record of the group is an indeterminate Sejidae deutonymph from the mid-Cretaceous (Albian-Cenomanian) aged Burmese amber of Myanmar.

== Taxonomy ==
Taxonomy to families (Beaulieu 2011). Genus and species counts fluctuate over time.

Order Mesostigmata G. Canestrini, 1891

Suborder Monogynaspida Camin & Gorirossi, 1955

Infraorder Gamasina Kramer, 1881

Hyporder Arctacariae Johnston, 1982

Superfamily Arctacaroidea Evans, 1955

Family Arctacaridae Evans, 1955 (2 genera, 6 species)

Hyporder Dermanyssiae Evans & Till, 1979

Superfamily Ascoidea Voigts & Oudemans, 1905

Family Ameroseiidae Evans, 1961 (10 genera, 148 species)
Family Ascidae Voigts & Oudemans, 1905 (17 genera, 338 species)
Family Melicharidae Hirschmann, 1962 (12 genera, 201 species)

Superfamily Dermanyssoidea Kolenati, 1859

Family Dasyponyssidae Fonseca, 1940 (2 genera, 2 species)
Family Dermanyssidae Kolenati, 1859 (2 genera, 26 species)
Family Entonyssidae Ewing, 1923 (9 genera, 27 species)
Family Haemogamasidae Oudemans, 1926 (5 genera, 78 species)
Family Halarachnidae Oudemans, 1906 (7 genera, 43 species)
Family Hystrichonyssidae Keegan, Yunker & Baker, 1960 (1 genus, 1 species)
Family Iphiopsididae Kramer, 1886 (14 genera, 68 species)
Family Ixodorhynchidae Ewing, 1923 (6 genera, 43 species)
Family Laelapidae Berlese, 1892 (90 genera, 1316 species)
Family Larvamimidae Elzinga, 1993 (6 genera, 43 species)
Family Macronyssidae Oudemans, 1936 (34 genera, 233 species)
Family Manitherionyssidae Radovsky & Yunker, 1971 (1 genus, 1 species)
Family Omentolaelapidae Fain, 1961 (1 genus, 1 species)
Family Rhinonyssidae Trouessart, 1895 (8 genera, 510 species)
Family Spelaeorhynchidae Oudemans, 1902 (1 genus, 7 species)
Family Spinturnicidae Oudemans, 1901 (12 genera, 101 species)
Family Varroidae Delfinado & Baker, 1974 (2 genera, 6 species)

Superfamily Eviphidoidea Berlese, 1913

Family Eviphididae Berlese, 1913 (19 genera, 108 species)
Family Leptolaelapidae Karg, 1978 (12 genera, 48 species)
Family Macrochelidae Vitzthum, 1930 (20 genera, 470 species)
Family Pachylaelapidae Berlese, 1913 (26 genera, 199 species)
Family Parholaspididae Evans, 1956 (12 genera, 96 species)

Superfamily Phytoseioidea Berlese, 1916

Family Blattisociidae Garman, 1948 (11 genera, 369 species)
Family Otopheidomenidae Treat, 1955 (10 genera, 28 species)
Family Phytoseiidae Berlese, 1916 (90 genera, 2300 species)
Family Podocinidae Berlese, 1913 (2 genera, 25 species)

Superfamily Rhodacaroidea Oudemans, 1902

Family Digamasellidae Evans, 1957 (13 genera, 261 species)
Family Halolaelapidae Karg, 1965 (4 genera, 80 species)
Family Laelaptonyssidae Womersley, 1956 (1 genus, 6 species)
Family Ologamasidae Ryke, 1962 (45 genera, 452 species)
Family Rhodacaridae Oudemans, 1902 (15 genera, 148 species)
Family Teranyssidae Halliday, 2006 (1 genus, 1 species)

Superfamily Veigaioidea Oudemans, 1939

Family Veigaiidae Oudemans, 1939 (4 genera, 95 species)

Hyporder Epicriiae Kramer, 1885

Superfamily Epicrioidea Berlese, 1885

Family Epicriidae Berlese, 1885 (4 genera, 48 species)

Superfamily Heatherelloidea Walter, 1997

Family Heatherellidae Walter, 1997 (1 genus, 2 species)

Superfamily Zerconoidea G. Canestrini, 1891

Family Coprozerconidae Moraza & Lindquist, 1999 (1 genus, 1 species)
Family Zerconidae G. Canestrini, 1891 (36 genera, 390, species)

Hyporder Parasitiae Evans & Till, 1979

Superfamily Parasitoidea Oudemans, 1901

Family Parasitidae Oudemans, 1901 (35 genera, 426 species)

Infraorder Uropodina Kramer, 1881

Family Dithinozerconidae Ainscough, 1979

Superfamily Diarthrophalloidea Trägårdh, 1946

Family Diarthrophallidae Trägårdh, 1946 (22 genera, 63 species)

Superfamily Microgynioidea Trägårdh, 1942

Family Microgyniidae Trägårdh, 1942 (2 genera, 4 species)
Family Nothogynidae Walter & Krantz, 1999 (1 genus, 2 species)

Superfamily Thinozerconoidea Halbert, 1915

Family Protodinychidae Evans, 1957 (1 genus, 3 species)
Family Thinozerconidae Halbert, 1915 (1 genus, 1 species)

Superfamily Uropodoidea Kramer, 1881

Family Baloghjkaszabiidae Hirschmann, 1979 (1 genus, 3 species)
Family Brasiluropodidae Hirschmann, 1979 (2 genera, 18 species)
Family Cillibidae Trägårdh, 1944 (2 genera, 19 species)
Family Clausiadinychidae Hirschmann, 1979 (1 genus, 4 species)
Family Cyllibulidae Hirschmann, 1979 (1 genus, 32 species)
Family Deraiophoridae Trägårdh, 1952 (1 genus, 36 species)
Family Dinychidae Berlese, 1916 (1 genus, 34 species)
Family Discourellidae Baker & Wharton, 1952 (1 genus, 76 species)
Family Eutrachytidae Trägårdh, 1944 (1 genus, 36 species)
Family Hutufeideriidae Hirschmann, 1979 (1 genus, 9 species)
Family Kaszabjbaloghiidae Hirschmann, 1979 (1 genus, 6 species)
Family Macrodinychidae Hirschmann, 1979 (1 genus, 27 species)
Family Metagynuridae Balogh, 1943 (2 genera, 17 species)
Family Nenteriidae Hirschmann, 1979 (2 genera, 128 species)
Family Oplitidae Johnston, 1968 (8 genera, 163 species)
Family Phymatodiscidae Hirschmann, 1979 (1 genus, 10 species)
Family Polyaspididae Berlese, 1913 (1 genus, 16 species)
Family Prodinychidae Berlese, 1917 (3 genera, 16 species)
Family Rotundabaloghiidae Hirschmann, 1979 (4 genera, 165 species)
Family Tetrasejaspidae Hirschmann, 1979 (1 genus, 15 species)
Family Trachytidae Trägårdh, 1938 (7 genera, 108 species)
Family Trachyuropodidae Berlese, 1917 (17 genera, 99 species)
Family Trematuridae Berlese, 1917 (13 genera, 401 species)
Family Trichocyllibidae Hirschmann, 1979 (5 genera, 57 species)
Family Trichouropodellidae Hirschmann, 1979 (1 genus, 11 species)
Family Trigonuropodidae Hirschmann, 1979 (1 genus, 87 species)
Family Uroactiniidae Hirschmann & Zirngiebl-Nicol, 1964 (3 genera, 67 species)
Family Urodiaspididae Trägårdh, 1944 (3 genera, 26 species)
Family Urodinychidae Berlese, 1917 (13 genera, 267 species)
Family Uropodidae Kramer, 1881 (9 genera, 261 species)

Suborder Sejida Kramer, 1885

Superfamily Heterozerconoidea Berlese, 1892

Family Discozerconidae Berlese, 1910 (2 genera, 3 species)
Family Heterozerconidae Berlese, 1892 (7 genera, 13 species)

Superfamily Sejoidea Berlese, 1885

Family Ichthyostomatogasteridae Sellnick, 1953 (3 genera, 10 species)
Family Sejidae Berlese, 1885 (5 genera, 46 species) (5 genera, 46 species)
Family Uropodellidae Camin, 1955 (1 genus, 6 species)

Suborder Trigynaspida Camin & Gorirossi, 1955

Infraorder Antennophorina Camin & Gorirossi, 1955

Superfamily Aenictequoidea Kethley, 1977

Family Aenictequidae Kethley, 1977 (1 genus, 1 species)
Family Euphysalozerconidae Kim, 2008 (1 genus, 1 species)
Family Messoracaridae Kethley, 1977 (2 genera, 3 species)
Family Ptochacaridae Kethley, 1977 (1 genus, 3 species)

Superfamily Antennophoroidea Berlese, 1892

Family Antennophoridae Berlese, 1892 (6 genera, 19 species)

Superfamily Celaenopsoidea Berlese, 1892

Family Celaenopsidae Berlese, 1892 (7 genera, 14 species)
Family Costacaridae Hunter, 1993 (1 genus, 1 species)
Family Diplogyniidae Trägårdh, 1941 (42 genera, 85 species)
Family Euzerconidae Trägårdh, 1938 (12 genera, 24 species)
Family Megacelaenopsidae Funk, 1975 (2 genera, 2 species)
Family Neotenogyniidae Kethley, 1974 (1 genus, 1 species)
Family Schizogyniidae Trägårdh, 1950 (6 genera, 10 species)
Family Triplogyniidae Funk, 1977 (2 genera, 11 species)

Superfamily Fedrizzioidea Trägårdh, 1937

Family Fedrizziidae Trägårdh, 1937 (3 genera, 34 species)
Family Klinckowstroemiidae Camin & Gorirossi, 1955 (4 genera, 36 species)

Superfamily Megisthanoidea Berlese, 1914

Family Hoplomegistidae Camin & Gorirossi, 1955 (1 genus, 7 species)
Family Megisthanidae Berlese, 1914 (1 genus, 30 species)

Superfamily Paramegistoidea Trägårdh, 1946

Family Paramegistidae Trägårdh, 1946 (5 genera, 30 species)

Superfamily Parantennuloidea Willmann, 1941

Family Parantennulidae Willmann, 1941 (3 genera, 5 species)
Family Philodanidae Kethley, 1977 (2 genera, 2 species)
Family Promegistidae Kethley, 1977 (1 genus, 1 species)

Infraorder Cercomegistina Camin & Gorirossi, 1955

Superfamily Cercomegistoidea Trägårdh, 1937

Family Asternoseiidae Vale, 1954 (2 genera, 3 species)
Family Cercomegistidae Trägårdh, 1937 (5 genera, 13 species)
Family Davacaridae Kethley, 1977 (2 genera, 4 species)
Family Pyrosejidae Lindquist & Moraza, 1993 (2 genera, 3 species)
Family Saltiseiidae Walter, 2000 (1 genus, 1 species)
Family Seiodidae Kethley, 1977 (1 genus, 1 species)

Other
Meliponopus palpifer Fain & Flechtmann, 1985 has not yet been placed into a family.
