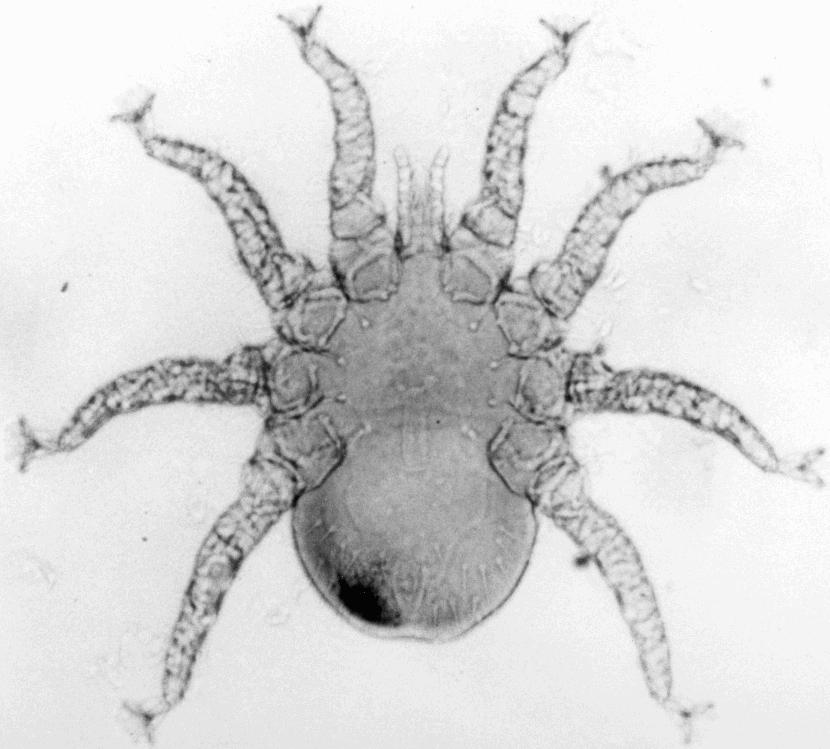
- Tinaminyssus melloi (Rhinonyssidae)

Scientific classification
- Kingdom: Animalia
- Phylum: Arthropoda
- Subphylum: Chelicerata
- Class: Arachnida
- Order: Mesostigmata
- Suborder: Monogynaspida
- Infraorder: Gamasina
- Superfamily: Dermanyssoidea; Kolenati, 1859

= Dermanyssoidea =

Dermanyssoidea Temporal range: Palaeogene–present

Superfamily of mites

Dermanyssoidea is a superfamily of mites, including most of the mites which parasitise vertebrates.

== Families ==
Dermanyssoidea contains 21 families:

- Dasyponyssidae
- Dermanyssidae
- Entonyssidae
- Haemogamasidae
- Halarachnidae
- Hirstionyssidae
- Hystrichonyssidae
- Ixodorhynchidae
- Laelapidae
- Larvamimidae
- Leptolaelapidae
- Macronyssidae
- Manitherionyssidae
- Omentolaelapidae
- Pneumophionyssidae
- Raillietiidae
- Rhinonyssidae
- Spelaeorhynchidae
- Spinturnicidae
- Trichoaspididae
- Uronyssidae
- Varroidae

The familial composition is debated. For example, a 2010 analysis found Spelaeorhynchidae and Spinturnicidae to be more closely related to Eviphidoidea than to Dermanyssoidea.

== Description ==
Dermanyssoidea are morphologically variable. For example, within Dermanyssus (Dermanyssidae) alone, there are some species that are compact and sclerotised with short and stout legs, while others are soft-bodied (to allow engorgement with blood) with reduced shields and slender legs. Like mites in general, Dermanyssoidea have a pair of chelicerae, but the size and shape of cheliceral segments and digits is highly variable across the superfamily.

Spelaeorhynchidae and Spinturnicidae are highly modified morphologically for living on bats, with Spelaeorhynchus praecursor (the first known species of Spelaeorhynchidae) initially being mistaken for a tick due to its appearance. Similarly, the laelapid Sphaeroseius ecitophilus looks like a spider, not a mite, and was misidentified as a spider initially (Brucharachne ecitophila).

== Parasitism ==
This superfamily engages in various forms of parasitism on a wide range of hosts. Some mainly inhabit animal nests and move onto hosts only to feed, while others live on hosts permanently. In the former group, there are facultative parasites that may feed on a host but are normally predacious, and obligate parasites that must feed on a host.

- Dermanyssidae and Macronyssidae are hematophagous parasites of vertebrates, mainly birds and rodents. They feed on blood using chelicerae in the form of a stylet. They can go for long periods without feeding.
- Spelaeorhynchidae and Spinturnicidae are ectoparasites of bats.
- Some species of Laelapidae are parasites, such as on rodents. These include facultative nest parasites, obligatory nest parasites and permanent fur parasites. However, other species in this family are free-living predators or bee associates.
- Entonyssidae, Ixodorhynchidae and Omentolaelapidae are parasites of snakes, with the first of these being endoparasites of the respiratory system.
- Halarachnidae are endoparasites of the respiratory system of mammals.
- Rhinonyssidae are endoparasites of the respiratory system of birds.
- Dasyponyssidae are parasites of armadillos.
- The sole species of Hystrichonyssidae is a parasite of Asian porcupines.
- The sole species of Manitherionnyssidae is a parasite of pangolins.
- Lastly, Varroidae are parasites of honey bees.

== Disease transmission ==
Due to their parasitism, some Dermanyssoidea are vectors of disease-causing pathogens. They are known or suspected to transmit viruses, bacteria, protozoans and nematodes. Most of these vectors are in families Dermanyssidae, Macronyssidae and Laelapidae.

== Phylogeny ==
A 2010 analysis suggests that parasitism evolved independently at least eight times within Dermanyssoidea.
