= Urotrema scabridum =

Scientific classification
- Kingdom: Animalia
- Phylum: Platyhelminthes
- Class: Trematoda
- Order: Plagiorchiida
- Family: Pleurogenidae
- Genus: Urotrema
- Species: U. scabridum

Binomial name
- Urotrema scabridum (Braun, 1900)

Species of fluke

Urotrema scabridum is a fluke in the genus Urotrema of family Urotrematidae. Recorded hosts include:

- Marsh rice rat (Oryzomys palustris)—salt marsh, Cedar Key, Florida
- Gray bat (Myotis grisescens)—Crawford, Kansas
- Anolis biporcatus—Panama
- Anolis olssoni—Hispaniola

among others.

== See also ==
- List of parasites of the marsh rice rat

== Literature cited ==
- Bray, R.A., Gibson, D.I. and Zhang, J. 1999. Urotrematidae Poche, 1926 (Platyhelminthes: Digenea) in Chinese freshwater fishes. Systematic Parasitology 44:193–200.
- Bursey, C.R., Goldberg, S.R. and Telford, S.R. Jr. 2003. Strongyluris panamaensis n. sp. (Nematoda: Heterakidae) and other helminths from the lizard, Anolis biporcatus (Sauria: Polychrotidae), from Panama. Journal of Parasitology 89(1):118–123.
- Goldberg, S.R., Bursey, C.R. and Cheam, H. 1998. Helminths of six species of Anolis lizards (Polychrotidae) from Hispaniola, West Indies. The Journal of Parasitology 84(6):1291–1295.
- Kinsella, J.M. 1988. Comparison of helminths of rice rats, Oryzomys palustris, from freshwater and saltwater marshes in Florida. Proceedings of the Helminthological Society of Washington 55(2):275–280.
- Nickel, P.A. and Hansen, M.F. 1967. Helminths of bats collected in Kansas, Nebraska and Oklahoma. American Midland Naturalist 78(2):481–486.
