= Manitherionyssus =

Scientific classification
- Kingdom: Animalia
- Phylum: Arthropoda
- Subphylum: Chelicerata
- Class: Arachnida
- Order: Mesostigmata
- Suborder: Monogynaspida
- Infraorder: Gamasina
- Superfamily: Dermanyssoidea
- Family: Manitherionyssidae; Radovsky & Yunker, 1971
- Genus: Manitherionyssus; Vitzthum, 1925
- Species: M. heterotarsus

Binomial name
- Manitherionyssus heterotarsus Vitzthum, 1925

Genus of mites

Manitherionyssus heterotarsus is a species of mite placed in its own family, Manitherionyssidae, in the order Mesostigmata.
