= Dermanyssus diphyes =

Scientific classification
- Kingdom: Animalia
- Phylum: Arthropoda
- Subphylum: Chelicerata
- Class: Arachnida
- Order: Mesostigmata
- Family: Dermanyssidae
- Genus: Dermanyssus
- Species: D. diphyes

Binomial name
- Dermanyssus diphyes Knee, 2008

Species of mite

Dermanyssus diphyes is a mite that is parasitic in the nasal passages of some birds found in Alberta and Manitoba, Canada.
