= Louis-Joseph Alcide Railliet =

French veterinarian and helminthologist

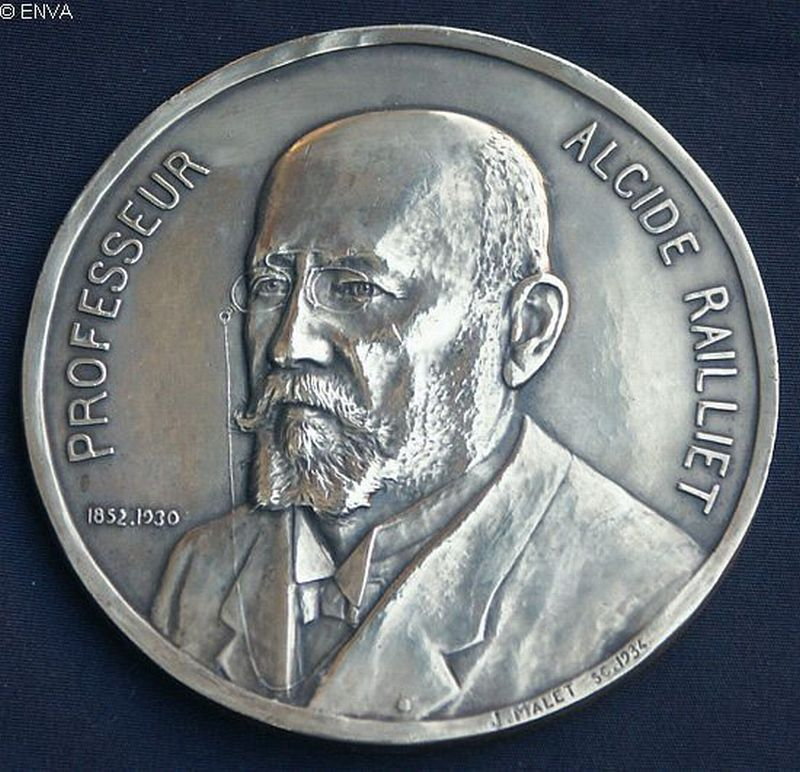
- Medal in honour of Alcide Railliet
- Born: 11 March 1852; La Neuville-lès-Wasigny, France
- Died: 25 December 1930 (aged 78); Saint-Germain-sur-Morin, France
- Citizenship: French
- Known for: Veterinary Parasitology Helminthology
- Scientific career
- Author abbrev. (zoology): Railliet

Louis-Joseph Alcide Railliet (also known as Alcide Railliet, born 11 March 1852 at La Neuville-lès-Wasigny in the Ardennes – died 25 December 1930) was a French veterinarian and helminthologist.

Professor at the Veterinary School of Alfort, he is considered one of the founders of modern parasitology and wrote several books of veterinary parasitology. He chaired the Société zoologique de France in 1891. He was a member of the French Académie Nationale de Médecine, from 29 December 1896 to his death. He received the Legion of Honor.

== Tributes ==
Railliet's name is honoured by several genera: Raillietia (Acari), Raillietina (Cestodes), Raillietascaris, Raillietnema and Raillietstrongylus (Nematodes), Raillietiella (Pentastomida), and the Acari family Raillietiidae.
Numerous species were named after Railliet, such as Amidostomum raillieti, Angiocaulus raillieti, Aspidodera raillieti, Conoweberia raillieti, Eucoleus raillieti, Haemostrongylus raillieti, Henryella raillieti, Onchocerca raillieti, Protostrongylus raillieti, Quasiamidostomum raillieti, and Thominx raillieti (Nematodes), Coccidium raillieti and Eimeria raillieti (Coccidia), Dibothriocephalus raillieti, Hilmylepis raillieti, Ichthyotoenia raillieti, Sparganum raillieti, and Synthetocaulus raillieti (Cestodes).
All these animals are parasites, named in honour of Railliet by other parasitologists (the list of species may include synonyms).

== Bibliography ==
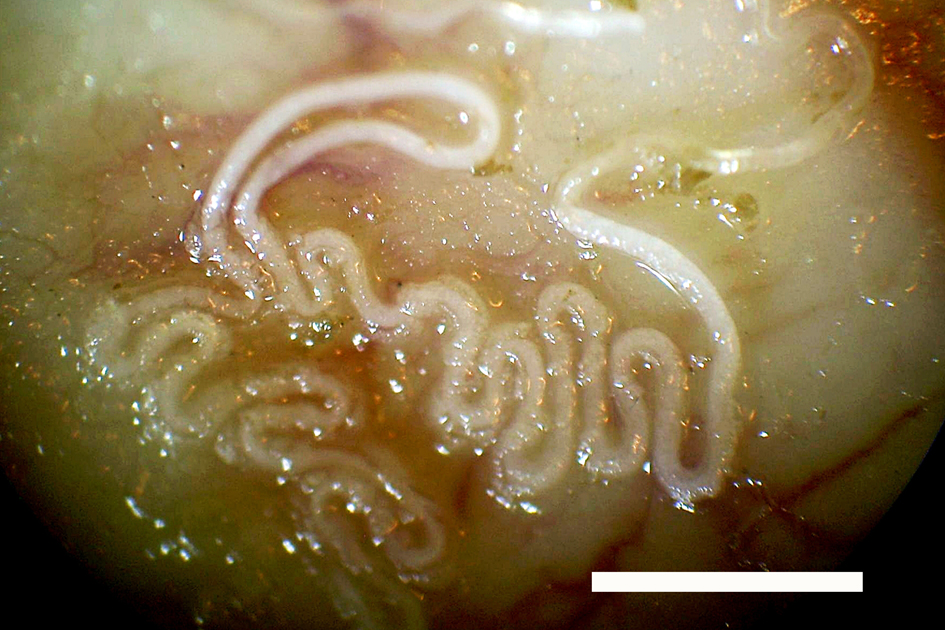
Eucoleus aerophilus, a nematode of the family Capillariidae, which was created by Railliet in 1915

- Éléments de zoologie médicale et agricole, Asselin et Houzeau, Paris, 1885 Complete text in Gallica
- Notices helminthologiques, impr. de Vve Renou et Maulde, Paris, 1885.
- Parasites animaux : Les Parasites transmissibles des animaux à l'homme, envisagés spécialement au point de vue de la prophylaxie, A. Maulde, Paris, 1892 Complete text in Gallica
- "Une nouvelle affection parasitaire du lièvre et du lapin de garenne", in Revue des sciences naturelles appliquées, n˚8, 20 avril 1890.
- "Les Parasites de nos animaux domestiques", in Revue des sciences naturelles appliquées, n˚16, 20 août 1890.
- Avec Léon Moulé, Histoire de l'École d'Alfort, Paris, Asselin et Houzeau,1908.
