= Synasponyssus =

Scientific classification
- Kingdom: Animalia
- Phylum: Arthropoda
- Subphylum: Chelicerata
- Class: Arachnida
- Order: Mesostigmata
- Family: Macronyssidae
- Genus: Synasponyssus; Radovsky & Furman, 1969
- Species: S. wenzeli

Binomial name
- Synasponyssus wenzeli Radovsky & Furman, 1969

Genus of mites

Synasponyssus is a genus of bat mites in the family Macronyssidae. There is at least one described species in Synasponyssus, S. wenzeli.
