= Macronyssidae =

Scientific classification
- Kingdom: Animalia
- Phylum: Arthropoda
- Subphylum: Chelicerata
- Class: Arachnida
- Order: Mesostigmata
- Superfamily: Dermanyssoidea
- Family: Macronyssidae; Oudemans, 1936

Family of mites

The Macronyssidae are a family of parasitic mites in the order Mesostigmata.

== Genera and species ==
Arachnyssus Ma Liming, 2002

- Arachnyssus guangxiensis Ma Liming, 2002
- Arachnyssus huwenae Ma-Liming, 2002

Argitis Yunker & Saunders, 1973

- Argitis oryzomys Yunker & Saunders, 1973

Bdellonyssus Fonseca, 1941

- Bdellonyssus bacoti (Hirst, 1913)

Chiroecetes Herrin & Radovsky, 1974

- Chiroecetes lonchophylla Herrin & Radovsky, 1974

Chiroptonyssus Auguston, 1945

- Chiroptonyssus brennani Yunker, Lukoschus & Giesen, 1990
- Chiroptonyssus robustipes (Ewing, 1925)

Coprolactistus Radovsky & Krantz, 1998

- Coprolactistus whitakeri Radovsky & Krantz, 1998

Glauconyssus K. Uchikawa, 1991

- Glauconyssus tanzaniensis K. Uchikawa, 1991

Hirstesia Fonseca, 1948

- Hirstesia sternalis (Hirst, 1921)

Kolenationyssus Fonseca, 1948

- Kolenationyssus athleticus Fonseca, 1948

Lepidodorsum R.C.Saunders & Yunker, 1975

- Lepidodorsum tiptoni Saunders & Yunker, 1975

Liponyssus Kolenati, 1858

- Liponyssus setosus (Kolenati, 1857)

Macronyssus Kolenati, 1858

- Macronyssus aristippe (Domrow, 1959)
- Macronyssus chuanguiensis Zhou, Zhang, Jiang & Wang, 1996
- Macronyssus dechangensis Zhou, Zhang, Jiang & Wang, 1996
- Macronyssus emeiensis Zhou, Wang & Wang, 1996
- Macronyssus evansi Stanjukovich, 1990
- Macronyssus flavus (Kolenati, 1856)
- Macronyssus fujianensis Zhou, Wang & Wang, 1996
- Macronyssus granulosus (Kolenati, 1856)
- Macronyssus hongheensis Gu & Tao, 1996
- Macronyssus hosonoi Uchikawa, 1979
- Macronyssus laifengensis Wang & Shi, 1986
- Macronyssus leislerianus Fain, Walter & Heddergott, 2003
- Macronyssus leucippe (Domrow, 1959)
- Macronyssus longimanus Kolenati, 1858
- Macronyssus miraspinosus Gu & Wang, 1985
- Macronyssus murini Uchikawa, 1979
- Macronyssus quadrispinosus Tian & Gu, 1992
- Macronyssus rhinolophi (Oudemans, 1902)
- Macronyssus shimizui Uchikawa, 1979
- Macronyssus taiyuanensis Tian & Gu, 1992
- Macronyssus tashanensis Li & Teng, 1985
- Macronyssus tieni (Grochovskaya & Nguen Xuan Hoe, 1961)
- Macronyssus uncinatus (G. Canestrini, 1885)
- Macronyssus ventralis (Wen, 1975)
- Macronyssus xianduensis (Zhou, Tang & Wen, 1982)
- Macronyssus yesoensis Uchikawa, 1979
- Macronyssus zhijinensis Gu & Wang, 1985

Mitonyssoides C. E. Yunker, F. S. Lukoschus & K. M. T. Giesen, 1990

- Mitonyssoides stercoralis C. E. Yunker, F. S. Lukoschus & K. M. T. Giesen, 1990

Mitonyssus C. E. Yunker & F. J. Radovsky, 1980

- Mitonyssus molossinus Yunker & Radovsky, 1980
- Mitonyssus noctilio C. E. Yunker & F. J. Radovsky, 1980

Neoichoronyssus Fonseca, 1941

- Neoichoronyssus hubbardi (Jameson, 1949)
- Neoichoronyssus wernecki (Fonseca, 1935)

Neoliponyssus Ewing, 1929

- Neoliponyssus gordonensis (Hirst, 1923)

Nycteronyssus Saunders & Yunker, 1973

- Nycteronyssus desmodus Saunders & Yunker, 1973

Ophionyssus Mégnin, 1883

- Ophionyssus arnhemlandensis (Womersley, 1956)
- Ophionyssus dolatelacensis Fain & Bannert, 2002
- Ophionyssus ehmanni Domrow, 1985
- Ophionyssus galeotes Domrow, Heath & Kennedy, 1980
- Ophionyssus galloticolus Fain & Bannert, 2000
- Ophionyssus javanensis Micherdzinski & Lukoschus, 1987
- Ophionyssus lacertinus (Berlese, 1892)
- Ophionyssus myrmecophagus (Fonseca, 1954)
- Ophionyssus natricis (Gervais, 1844)
- Ophionyssus saurarum (Oudemans, 1901)
- Ophionyssus schreibericolus Moraza, 2009
- Ophionyssus scincorum Domrow, Heath & Kennedy, 1980
- Ophionyssus setosus Fain & Bannert, 2000
- Ophionyssus tropidosaurae (Till, 1957)

Ornithonyssus Sambon, 1928

- Ornithonyssus acrobates Micherdzinski & Domrow, 1985
- Ornithonyssus africanus (Zumpt & Till, 1958)
- Ornithonyssus bacoti (Hirst, 1913)
- Ornithonyssus benoiti Till, 1982
- Ornithonyssus bursa (Berlese, 1888)
- Ornithonyssus campester Micherdzinski & Domrow, 1985
- Ornithonyssus capensis Shepherd & Narro, 1983
- Ornithonyssus conciliatus (Radovsky, 1967)
- Ornithonyssus costai Micherdzinski, 1980
- Ornithonyssus dasyuri Domrow, 1983
- Ornithonyssus desultorius (Radovsky, 1966)
- Ornithonyssus flexus (Radovsky, 1967)
- Ornithonyssus garridoi de-la-Cruz, 1981
- Ornithonyssus jayanti (Advani & Vazirani, 1981)
- Ornithonyssus kochi (Fonseca, 1948)
- Ornithonyssus latro Domrow, 1963
- Ornithonyssus longisetosus Micherdzinski, 1980
- Ornithonyssus lukoschusi Micherdzinski, 1980
- Ornithonyssus matogrosso (Fonseca, 1954)
- Ornithonyssus noeli de-la-Cruz, 1983
- Ornithonyssus nyctinomi (Zumpt & Patterson, 1951)
- Ornithonyssus petauri Micherdzinski, 1980
- Ornithonyssus pereirai (Fonseca, 1935)
- Ornithonyssus pipistrelli (Oudemans, 1904)
- Ornithonyssus praedo Domrow, 1971
- Ornithonyssus roseinnesi (Zumpt & Till, 1953)
- Ornithonyssus simulatus Micherdzinski, 1980
- Ornithonyssus spinosa Manson, 1972
- Ornithonyssus stigmaticus Micherdzinski & Domrow, 1985
- Ornithonyssus sylviarum (G. Canestrini & Fanzago, 1877)
- Ornithonyssus taphozous Micherdzinski & Domrow, 1985

Oudemansiella Fonseca, 1948

- Oudemansiella saurarum (Oudemans, 1901)

Parichoronyssus Radovsky, 1966

- Parichoronyssus bakeri Morales-Malacara & Guerrero, 2007
- Parichoronyssus crassipes Radovsky, 1967
- Parichoronyssus cyrtosternum Radovsky, 1967
- Parichoronyssus euthysternum Radovsky, 1967
- Parichoronyssus kretzschmari Heddergott, 2008
- Parichoronyssus lopezi Morales-Malacara, 1996
- Parichoronyssus moralesmalacari Heddergott, 2008
- Parichoronyssus radovskyi Morales-Malacara, 1992
- Parichoronyssus sclerus Radovsky, 1966

Pellonyssus Clark & Yunker, 1956

- Pellonyssus gorgasi Yunker & Radovsky, 1966
- Pellonyssus nidi Gu & Duan, 1991
- Pellonyssus nidicolus Baker, Delfinado & Abbatiello, 1976
- Pellonyssus reedi (Zumpt & Patterson, 1952)

Radfordiella Fonseca, 1948

- Radfordiella oudemansi Fonseca, 1948

Steatonyssus Kolenati, 1858

- Steatonyssus aglaiae Stanjukovich, 1991
- Steatonyssus allredi Advani & Vazirani, 1981
- Steatonyssus balcellsi Estrada-Pena & Sanchez, 1988
- Steatonyssus cavus Rybin, 1992
- Steatonyssus decisetosus Advani & Vazirani, 1981
- Steatonyssus desertorus Rybin, 1992
- Steatonyssus flabellifer Gupta & Paul, 1985
- Steatonyssus furmani Tipton & Boese, 1958
- Steatonyssus lonchura Gupta & Paul, 1992
- Steatonyssus megaporus Gu & Wang, 1980
- Steatonyssus musculi (Schrank, 1803)
- Steatonyssus noctulus Rybin, 1992
- Steatonyssus nyctali Gu & Wang, 1982
- Steatonyssus patriciae Domrow, 1969
- Steatonyssus quadrisetosus Advani & Vazirani, 1981
- Steatonyssus sinicus Teng, 1980
- Steatonyssus surinamensis Yunker, Lukoschus & Giesen, 1990
- Steatonyssus teidae Estrada-Pena & Sanchez, 1988

Synasponyssus Radovsky & Furman, 1969

- Synasponyssus wenzeli Radovsky & Furman, 1969

Trichonyssus Domrow, 1959

- Trichonyssus australicus (Womersley, 1956)
- Trichonyssus caputmedusae Domrow, 1986
- Trichonyssus lukoschusi Micherdzinski & Domrow, 1985
- Trichonyssus nixoni Micherdzinski & Domrow, 1985
- Trichonyssus solivagus Domrow, 1986
- Trichonyssus streetorum Micherdzinski & Domrow, 1985
- Trichonyssus womersleyi Domrow, 1959
