= Parichoronyssus =

Scientific classification
- Kingdom: Animalia
- Phylum: Arthropoda
- Subphylum: Chelicerata
- Class: Arachnida
- Order: Mesostigmata
- Family: Macronyssidae
- Genus: Parichoronyssus; Radovsky, 1966

Genus of mites

Parichoronyssus is a genus of bat mites in the family Macronyssidae.
