= Coprolactistus =

Scientific classification
- Domain: Eukaryota
- Kingdom: Animalia
- Phylum: Arthropoda
- Subphylum: Chelicerata
- Class: Arachnida
- Order: Mesostigmata
- Family: Macronyssidae
- Genus: Coprolactistus; Radovsky & Krantz, 1998
- Species: C. whitakeri

Binomial name
- Coprolactistus whitakeri Radovsky & Krantz, 1998

Genus of mites

Coprolactistus is a genus of bird mites in the family Macronyssidae. There is at least one described species in Coprolactistus, C. whitakeri.
