= Hirstionyssidae =

Scientific classification
- Kingdom: Animalia
- Phylum: Arthropoda
- Subphylum: Chelicerata
- Class: Arachnida
- Order: Mesostigmata
- Superfamily: Dermanyssoidea
- Family: Hirstionyssidae; Evans & Till, 1966

Family of mites

Hirstionyssidae is a family of mites in the order Mesostigmata.

The family Hirstionyssidae has recently been treated as a subfamily of Laelapidae rather than an independent family.

== Species ==
Ancoranyssus Evans & Fain, 1968

- Ancoranyssus trichys Evans & Fain, 1968

Hirstionyssus Fonseca, 1948

- Hirstionyssus alvarezi Bassols-Batalla, Quintero-Martinez, Moreno-Moreno & Vessi-Lobato, 1991
- Hirstionyssus anisochaetus Liu & Ma, 2003
- Hirstionyssus ansaiensis Huang, 1990
- Hirstionyssus arcuatus (C.L.Koch, 1839)
- Hirstionyssus carnifex (C.L. Koch, 1839)
- Hirstionyssus chungwalii Mo, 1979
- Hirstionyssus citelli Huang, 1990
- Hirstionyssus cuonai Wang & Pan, in Wang, Pan & Yan 1994
- Hirstionyssus davydovae Nikolsky, 1984
- Hirstionyssus gansuensis Mal & Piao, 1987
- Hirstionyssus giganteus Zemskaya & Lange, 1979
- Hirstionyssus huangheensis Mal & Piao, 1987
- Hirstionyssus improvisus Koyumdzheva, 1978
- Hirstionyssus indochinensis Bregetova & Grohovskaja, 1961
- Hirstionyssus kutscheruki Zemskaya & Lange, 1979
- Hirstionyssus laterispinatus Mal & Piao, 1987
- Hirstionyssus martinezi Ramirez, Bassols & Santillan, 1980
- Hirstionyssus meridianus Zemskaja, 1955
- Hirstionyssus montanus Huang, 1990
- Hirstionyssus ningxiaensis Gu, Bai & Ding, 1988
- Hirstionyssus nitedulae Koyumdzheva, 1978
- Hirstionyssus pauli Willmann, 1952
- Hirstionyssus phodopi Bai & Gu, 1989
- Hirstionyssus posterospinus Wang & Yan, in Wang, Pan & Yan 1994
- Hirstionyssus pratentis Gu & Yang, 1986
- Hirstionyssus punctatus Gu & Yang, 1986
- Hirstionyssus qinghaiensis Gu & Yang, 1986
- Hirstionyssus sciurinus (Hirst, 1921)
- Hirstionyssus staffordi Strandtmann & Hunt, 1951
- Hirstionyssus xinghaiensis Mal & Piao, 1987
- Hirstionyssus zaisanica Senotrusova, 1987

Pseudancoranyssus A.Fain, 1991

- Pseudancoranyssus ruwenzoriensis A. Fain, 1991

Thadeua Domrow, 1977

- Thadeua greeni (Domrow, 1966)
- Thadeua mitchelli (Womersley, 1956)
- Thadeua rosamondae (Domrow, 1973)
- Thadeua serrata Domrow, 1977
- Thadeua validipes (Domrow, 1955)

Trichosurolaelaps Womersley, 1956

- Trichosurolaelaps crassipes Womersley, 1956
- Trichosurolaelaps dixous Domrow, 1972
- Trichosurolaelaps fallax Domrow, 1972
- Trichosurolaelaps harrisoni Domrow, 1961
- Trichosurolaelaps marra Domrow, 1972
- Trichosurolaelaps striatus Domrow, 1958
