= Trichoaspis =

Scientific classification
- Kingdom: Animalia
- Phylum: Arthropoda
- Subphylum: Chelicerata
- Class: Arachnida
- Order: Mesostigmata
- Suborder: Monogynaspida
- Infraorder: Gamasina
- Superfamily: Dermanyssoidea
- Family: Trichoaspididae; Y. M. Gu, C. S. Wang & J. H. Li, 1991
- Genus: Trichoaspis; Y. M. Gu, C. S. Wang & J. H. Li, 1991
- Species: T. julus

Binomial name
- Trichoaspis julus Y. M. Gu, C. S. Wang & J. H. Li, 1991

Genus of mites

Trichoaspis julus is a species of mite placed in its own family, Trichoaspididae, in the order Mesostigmata.
