= Trichonyssus =

Scientific classification
- Domain: Eukaryota
- Kingdom: Animalia
- Phylum: Arthropoda
- Subphylum: Chelicerata
- Class: Arachnida
- Order: Mesostigmata
- Family: Macronyssidae
- Genus: Trichonyssus; Domrow, 1959

Genus of mites

Trichonyssus is a genus of bird mites in the family Macronyssidae. There are at least three described species in Trichonyssus.

== Species ==
These three species belong to the genus Trichonyssus:

- Trichonyssus lukoschusi Micherdzinski & Domrow, 1985
- Trichonyssus nixoni Micherdzinski & Domrow, 1985
- Trichonyssus streetorum Micherdzinski & Domrow, 1985
