= Pneumophionyssus =

Scientific classification
- Kingdom: Animalia
- Phylum: Arthropoda
- Subphylum: Chelicerata
- Class: Arachnida
- Order: Mesostigmata
- Suborder: Monogynaspida
- Infraorder: Gamasina
- Superfamily: Dermanyssoidea
- Family: Pneumophionyssidae; Fonseca, 1940
- Genus: Pneumophionyssus; Fonseca, 1940

Species
- Pneumophionyssus aristoterisi Fonseca, 1940; Pneumophionyssus jellisoni Fain & Yunker, 1972

Genus of mites

Pneumophionyssus is a genus of mites placed in its own family, Pneumophionyssidae, in the order Mesostigmata.
