= Argitis =

Scientific classification
- Domain: Eukaryota
- Kingdom: Animalia
- Phylum: Arthropoda
- Subphylum: Chelicerata
- Class: Arachnida
- Order: Mesostigmata
- Family: Macronyssidae
- Genus: Argitis; Yunker & Saunders, 1973

Genus of mites

Argitis is a genus of bird mites in the family Macronyssidae.
