= Larvamima =

Scientific classification
- Kingdom: Animalia
- Phylum: Arthropoda
- Subphylum: Chelicerata
- Class: Arachnida
- Order: Mesostigmata
- Suborder: Monogynaspida
- Infraorder: Gamasina
- Superfamily: Dermanyssoidea
- Family: Larvamimidae; R. J. Elzinga, 1993
- Genus: Larvamima; R. J. Elzinga, 1993

Genus of mites

Larvamima is a genus of mites placed in its own family, Larvamimidae, in the order Mesostigmata. Larvamima contains four recognized species:

- Larvamima marianae R. J. Elzinga, 1993
- Larvamima carli Elzinga, 1993
- Larvamima cristata Elzinga, 1993
- Larvamima schneirlai Elzinga, 1993
