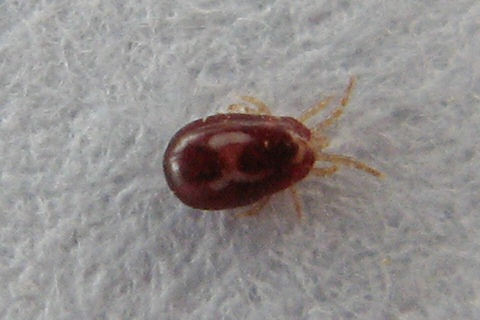
- Dermanyssus gallinae

Scientific classification
- Domain: Eukaryota
- Kingdom: Animalia
- Phylum: Arthropoda
- Subphylum: Chelicerata
- Class: Arachnida
- Order: Mesostigmata
- Family: Dermanyssidae
- Genus: Dermanyssus; Dugès, 1834

= Dermanyssus =

Genus of mites

Dermanyssus is a genus of mites in the family Dermanyssidae. The etymology of the word Dermanyssus is from the Greek: derma, meaning skin, and nyssein, meaning bite.

== Genera ==
- Dermanyssus
  - Dermanyssus americanus Ewing, 1923
  - Dermanyssus antillarum Dusbabek & Cerny, 1971
  - Dermanyssus apodis Roy, Dowling, Chauve & Buronfonsse, 2009
  - Dermanyssus brevirivulus Gu & Ting, 1992
  - Dermanyssus brevis Ewing, 1936
  - Dermanyssus carpathicus Zeman, 1979
  - Dermanyssus chelidonis Oudemans, 1939
  - Dermanyssus diphyes Knee, 2008
  - Dermanyssus faralloni Nelson & Furman, 1967
  - Dermanyssus gallinae (DeGeer, 1778)
  - Dermanyssus gallinoides Moss, 1966
  - Dermanyssus grochovskae Zemskaya
  - Dermanyssus hirsutus Moss & Radovsky, 1967
  - Dermanyssus hirundinis (Hermann, 1804)
  - Dermanyssus lacertarum (Contarini, 1847)
  - Dermanyssus longipes Berlese & Trouessart
  - Dermanyssus nipponensis Uchikawa & Kitaoka, 1981
  - Dermanyssus passerinus Berlese & Trouessart, 1889
  - Dermanyssus prognephilus Ewing, 1933
  - Dermanyssus quintus Vitzthum, 1921
  - Dermanyssus richiardii G. Canestrini & Fanzago, 1877
  - Dermanyssus rwandae Fain, 1993
  - Dermanyssus transvaalensis Evans & Till, 1962
  - Dermanyssus triscutatus Krantz, 1959
  - Dermanyssus trochilinis Moss, 1978
  - Dermanyssus wutaiensis Gu & Ting, 1992
