= Dasyponyssidae =

Scientific classification
- Kingdom: Animalia
- Phylum: Arthropoda
- Subphylum: Chelicerata
- Class: Arachnida
- Order: Mesostigmata
- Family: Dasyponyssidae; Fonseca, 1940

Family of mites

Dasyponyssidae is a small family of mites in the order Mesostigmata.

== Species ==
Dasyponyssidae contains two genera, with two recognized species:

- Genus Dasyponyssus Fonseca, 1940
  - Dasyponyssus neivai Fonseca, 1940
- Genus Xenarthronyssus Radovsky & Yunker, 1971
  - Xenarthronyssus furmani Radovsky & Yunker, 1971
