= Spelaeorhynchus =

Scientific classification
- Domain: Eukaryota
- Kingdom: Animalia
- Phylum: Arthropoda
- Subphylum: Chelicerata
- Class: Arachnida
- Order: Mesostigmata
- Superfamily: Dermanyssoidea
- Family: Spelaeorhynchidae; Oudemans, 1902
- Genus: Spelaeorhynchus; Neuman, 1902

Genus of mites

Spelaeorhynchus is a genus of mites placed in its own family, Spelaeorhynchidae, in the order Mesostigmata. It contains five recognized species:

- Spelaeorhynchus praecursor Neuman, 1902
- Spelaeorhynchus hutsoni Martyn, 1988
- Spelaeorhynchus jimi Peracchi, 1992
- Spelaeorhynchus soaresi Peracchi, 1992
- Spelaeorhynchus wenzeli Peracchi, 1992
