= Inclusion body disease =

Chronic and fatal viral disease observed in Boid snakes

Inclusion body disease (IBD) is an infectious and invariably fatal viral disease affecting captive specimens of the boid family of snakes, particularly Boa constrictor. It has been recognized since the mid-1970s. It is so named because of the characteristic intracytoplasmic inclusion bodies that are observed in clinical examinations in epidermal cells, oral mucosal epithelial cells, visceral epithelial cells, and neurons. In the 1970s and 1980s, the disease was most commonly observed in Burmese pythons (Python bivittatus). Since the 1980s it has been most commonly observed in boa constrictors. As of 2026 no treatment for IBD is known, and snakes that are diagnosed with IBD are usually euthanized to prevent suffering in the snake and to reduce the risk of further infections.

All boid snakes should be considered susceptible to the disease. Many zoos quarantine boas specifically as a result of the risk of IBD before introducing them into their permanent collections and breeding programs. While the disease has not been identified in non-boid snakes, non-boid snakes can harbour the virus. Mites are thought to be the primary vector of the virus, or at least to be a contributory factor.

Its distribution is worldwide, specifically in captive boid snakes. Its occurrence in the wild is unknown. The disease has only been identified in adult and subadult specimens, not neonates. Even so, all age groups are considered susceptible, and anecdotal reports of the infection in neonates have been made. A retro-like virus infection was suspected as the causative agent of IBD, but identification of highly divergent arenavirus sequences from boa constrictors with IBD suggested arenaviruses to be the etiological agent of IBD. Cell culture isolation of several arenaviruses from boid snakes with IBD further solidified, but did not yet confirm, the etiological relationship between IBD and arenaviruses.

In pythons and juvenile boas, the disease presents as an acute and severe neurological illness that is fatal in a few weeks. In adult boa constrictors, the disease assumes a milder, more chronic or, sometimes, even asymptomatic carrier form with a wide array of extremely variable manifestations that may or may not gradually progress to death over a course of months to years. Because they seem to tolerate infection so much better, boas are speculated to be the natural host of the virus, but this has not been confirmed.

== Clinical signs ==
Clinical signs may vary, with regurgitation and neurological symptoms being the most prominent in the early and later stages of its progression, respectively. In boa constrictors, the first signs may include off-and-on regurgitation followed by inappetence, and some develop head tremors. Abnormal shedding may occur. Some develop chronic regurgitation and anorexia (lack of appetite or refusal to feed). However, not all infected snakes may regurgitate. Boas lose weight and may develop clogged nares (nostrils), stomatitis, or secondary pneumonia. The disease can rapidly progress to produce nervous-system disorders, such as disorientation, corkscrewing of the head and neck, holding the head in abnormal and unnatural positions, rolling onto the back, or stargazing. Stomatitis, pneumonia, undifferentiated cutaneous sarcomas, lymphoproliferative disorders, and leukemia have all been observed in affected specimens. Burmese pythons generally show signs of central nervous system disease without manifestation of other clinical signs and regurgitation is seen only in boas. These are symptoms similar to those seen in specimens infected by Chlamydia–specifically Chlamydophila psittaci, the so-called parrot's disease.

Several snakes have been seen with proliferative pneumonia, while inclusions are commonly seen in the liver, kidney, and pancreas. Cases have also been observed with only very few inclusions. In a few snakes with signs of central nervous system disease, and with a severe encephalitis, no inclusions have been seen in any cells. While the presence of characteristic inclusions is diagnostic for the disease, the absence of such inclusions does not necessarily indicate that the snake is not diseased or is free from the IBD virus. While cells having inclusions may show mild degenerative changes, inflammation is rarely seen in visceral tissues. In the brain, mild to severe encephalitis occurs, with lymphocytic perivascular cuffing. Several snakes with lymphoproliferative disorders have been identified with lymphoid infiltrates in multiple organs.

== Laboratory diagnosis ==
The disease can be diagnosed in live snakes through blood tests.

== Primary route of transmission ==
The primary route of transmission has not yet been identified, but direct contact may result in its transmission to developing embryos in viviparous species and eggs in oviparous species. Venereal transmission is also indicated as a possibility.

The snake mite, Ophionyssus natricis, has been implicated as a possible vector for the virus, since mite infestations are commonly seen in epizootics of IBD and in captive specimens of these snakes. Mites are sometimes very difficult to eradicate due to their resistance to certain toxins used to eliminate them. Permethrin is effective against mite infestations, but must be used with great caution and only in small quantities due to its toxicity to snakes. Alternative approaches include biological agents that are sprayed onto infested animals that desiccate the mites, rendering them unable to lay their eggs or consume blood beneath the scales of their host. The incubation period for mite eggs is thought to be about 10–14 days, indicating that treatment repeated after 10 days might ensure that any eggs that hatch or larvae that develop into nymphs are eliminated from the host before reaching sexual maturity and reproducing.

== Prognosis and treatment ==
As of 2026, no treatment for IBD is known. Snakes diagnosed with or suspected of having IBD should be euthanized because progression and transmission of the virus is both very rapid and destructive. Newly acquired snakes should be quarantined for at least 3 and preferably 6 months before being introduced into established collections. The recommended period of quarantine for any wild-caught boa or python is at least 4–6 months.
