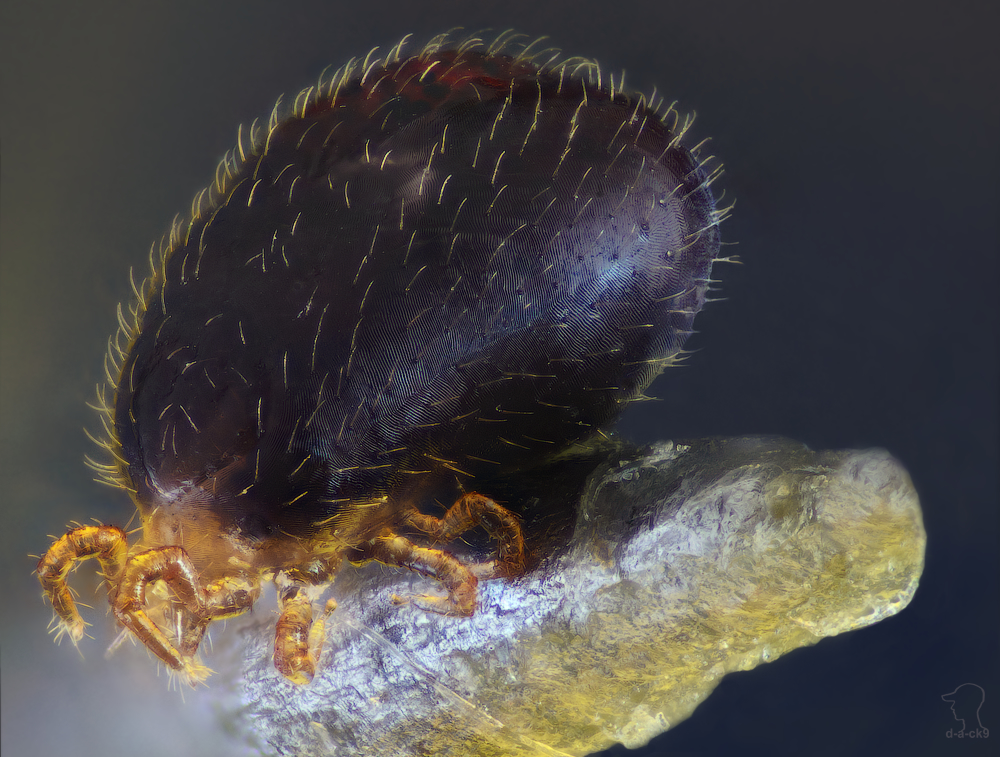
- Male Ophionyssus natricis

Scientific classification
- Kingdom: Animalia
- Phylum: Arthropoda
- Subphylum: Chelicerata
- Class: Arachnida
- Order: Mesostigmata
- Family: Macronyssidae
- Genus: Ophionyssus
- Species: O. natricis

Binomial name
- Ophionyssus natricis (Gervais, 1844)

= Ophionyssus natricis =

Species of mite

Ophionyssus natricis, the reptile mite, is a parasitic mite most commonly found on snakes, but also occurring on captive lizards, turtles, crocodiles, and other reptiles. The parasites feed on snakes, which cause the bodies of the mites to be engorged with blood and fluids from the snake. Once the mites feed by puncturing through the snake skin, the snake usually shows symptoms of irritation and discomfort. The involvement of snake mites in transmission of infectious illnesses like inclusion body disease and ophidian paramyxovirus remains controversial. Human infestation has been reported.

== Morphology ==
The larvae are pale white. They either stay pale ivory or yellow if unfed in the protonymph stage. The mites turn a dark red if feeding does occur. After feeding, the mites have a soft body that is dark red or black in color and noticeable legs that can be seen by the human eye during the deutonymph stage.

As adults, male mites are smaller than their female counterparts. The colors can range from dark yellowish-brown, dark red, or black depending on the feeding of the mite on the snake. Female adults, however, are big, fat, and black mites. They weigh 50 μg, but can weigh 750 μg if fully engorged from the blood meal.

== Lifecycle ==
The five life stages for the snake mite are egg, larva, protonymph, deutonymph, and adult. The intermediate stages (larva, protonymph, and deutonymph) must shed at least once to progress into the next stage. The ideal conditions in the environment for the mite to fully develop into a parasite are at temperatures between 75 and 85 °F (24 and 29 °C) and a relative humidity of 70%–90%. The life stages can be completed usually in 13 to 19 days.

Unfavorable conditions in the environment cause impairment of development and survival at all stages. Mites are killed at all stages when exposed to temperatures above 105 °F (41 °C) or below 35 °F (2 °C) for several days. In terms of humidity, the mites desiccate at levels below 20%. The mites also drown if they are wet.

Females can lay a dozen or two eggs at a time (60 to 80 in a lifetime). The eggs are usually laid in dark and humid areas. They are rarely laid on the snake where the adult mites are found. Eggs hatch in one day in ideal conditions.

After hatching, the young mites go through the larval stage, which takes about one or two days. The larvae tend to move very little away from the eggs, despite having the ability to walk.

The larvae progress next into the protonymph stage, which can last three days to two weeks. At this stage, the protonymphs become attracted to the smell of snakes and require a blood meal from the snakes to go into the next stage. The protonymphs tend to walk around the scale surfaces and head plates of the snake. When they find a suitable feeding site, they slip into the space between the scales and use their chelicerae to lance the skin and feed on the blood that flows out. This process is known as telmophagy, or "pool feeding". This is in contrast with solenophagy, where the skin is pierced and blood is sucked directly from the vessels, as occurs in mosquitos.

The deutonymph stage then takes place after the blood meal at a place usually away from the snake. Shedding takes about a day to become adult mites. At the adult stage, the mites continue to feed on the snake host until the male mates with a female that is not engorged. Adult mites usually live up to 40 days.

== Treatments ==
Ivermectin can also be used to get rid of the mites. For complete eradication, the environment must be treated properly, as well. Insecticides are not very useful when treating snakes for having snake mites. Insecticides are usually highly toxic to snakes, so this treatment should not be used in the presence of snakes.

Use of the predatory mite Hypoaspis miles (now Stratiolaelaps scimitus) is advocated by some herpetologists as a nontoxic means of eradicating a population of O. natricis.

In January, 2023 a study was published about the use of Afoxolaner for treating mite infestations in pet snakes. No live mites were found 24 hours after the drug was administered, and no mites at all were found after 14 and 28 days.
