= Omentolaelaps =

Scientific classification
- Kingdom: Animalia
- Phylum: Arthropoda
- Subphylum: Chelicerata
- Class: Arachnida
- Order: Mesostigmata
- Suborder: Monogynaspida
- Infraorder: Gamasina
- Superfamily: Dermanyssoidea
- Family: Omentolaelapidae; Fain, 1961
- Genus: Omentolaelaps; Fain, 1961
- Species: O. mehelyae

Binomial name
- Omentolaelaps mehelyae Fain, 1961

Genus of mites

Omentolaelaps mehelyae is a species of mite placed in its own family, Omentolaelapidae, in the order Mesostigmata.
