= Glauconyssus =

Scientific classification
- Domain: Eukaryota
- Kingdom: Animalia
- Phylum: Arthropoda
- Subphylum: Chelicerata
- Class: Arachnida
- Order: Mesostigmata
- Family: Macronyssidae
- Genus: Glauconyssus; Uchikawa, 1991

Genus of mites

Glauconyssus is a genus of bird mites in the family Macronyssidae.
