= Raillietia =

Scientific classification
- Kingdom: Animalia
- Phylum: Arthropoda
- Subphylum: Chelicerata
- Class: Arachnida
- Order: Mesostigmata
- Suborder: Monogynaspida
- Infraorder: Gamasina
- Superfamily: Dermanyssoidea
- Family: Raillietiidae; Vitzthum, 1943
- Genus: Raillietia; Troessart, 1902

Genus of mites

Raillietia is a genus of mites placed in its own family, Railletiidae, in the order Mesostigmata. Its name honours French parasitologist Louis-Joseph Alcide Railliet. It contains seven recognized species:

- Raillietia acevedoi Quintero-Martinez, Bassols-Batalla & DaMassa, 1992
- Raillietia auris (Leidy, 1872)
- Raillietia australis Domrow, 1961
- Raillietia caprae Quintero, Bassols & Acevedo, 1980
- Raillietia flechtmanni Faccini, Leite & da-Costa, 1992
- Raillietia manfredi Domrow, 1980
- Raillietia whartoni Potter & Johnston, 1978
