= Bdellonyssus =

Scientific classification
- Domain: Eukaryota
- Kingdom: Animalia
- Phylum: Arthropoda
- Subphylum: Chelicerata
- Class: Arachnida
- Order: Mesostigmata
- Family: Dermanyssidae
- Genus: Bdellonyssus; Fonseca, 1941

Genus of mites

Bdellonyssus is a genus of mites in the family Dermanyssidae. There are at least two described species in Bdellonyssus.

== Species ==
These two species belong to the genus Bdellonyssus:

- Bdellonyssus bursa (Berlese, 1888)
- Bdellonyssus venezolanus Vitzthum, 1931
