= Hystrichonyssus =

Scientific classification
- Kingdom: Animalia
- Phylum: Arthropoda
- Subphylum: Chelicerata
- Class: Arachnida
- Order: Mesostigmata
- Suborder: Monogynaspida
- Infraorder: Gamasina
- Superfamily: Dermanyssoidea
- Family: Hystrichonyssidae; Keegan, Yunker & Baker, 1960
- Genus: Hystrichonyssus; Keegan, Yunker & Baker, 1960
- Species: H. turneri

Binomial name
- Hystrichonyssus turneri Keegan, Yunker & Baker, 1960

Genus of mites

Hystrichonyssidae is a family of mites in the order Mesostigmata. The family consists of a sole genus, Hystrichonyssus. This genus consists of only one species of mite, being Hystrichonyssus turneri.

== Description ==
H. turneri can be found primarily using the Malayan porcupine as a host.

The species is solely found in the upper peninsula of Malaysia, though it can be found on non-endemic species.
