= Urotrema =

Scientific classification
- Kingdom: Animalia
- Phylum: Platyhelminthes
- Class: Trematoda
- Order: Plagiorchiida
- Family: Pleurogenidae
- Genus: Urotrema; Braun, 1900

Genus of flatworms

Urotrema is a genus of flatworms belonging to the family Pleurogenidae.

The species of this genus are found in America.

Species:

- Urotrema aelleni Baer, 1957
- Urotrema lasiurensis
- Urotrema minuta Macy, 1933
- Urotrema scabridum Braun, 1900
