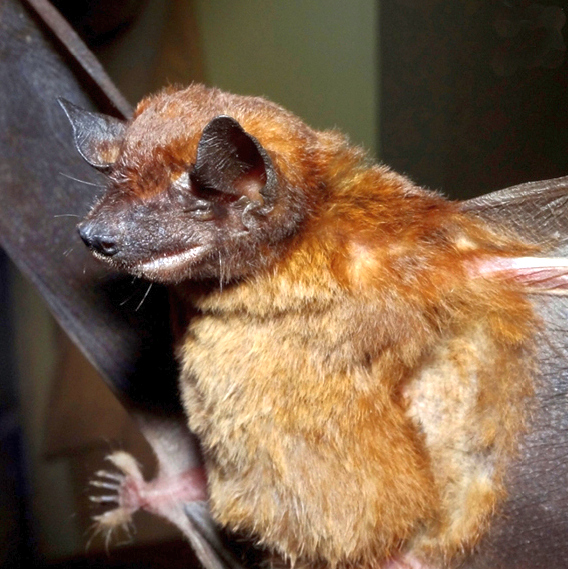

Conservation status
- Data Deficient (IUCN 3.1)

Scientific classification
- Kingdom: Animalia
- Phylum: Chordata
- Class: Mammalia
- Order: Chiroptera
- Family: Molossidae
- Genus: Molossops
- Species: M. neglectus

Binomial name
- Molossops neglectus Williams & Genoways, 1980

Synonyms
- Molossops temminckii Tuttle, 1970; not Dysopes temminckii Burmeister, 1854

= Rufous dog-faced bat =

Species of bat

The rufous dog-faced bat (Molossops neglectus), is a bat species found in Argentina, Brazil, Colombia, Guyana, Peru and Suriname.
