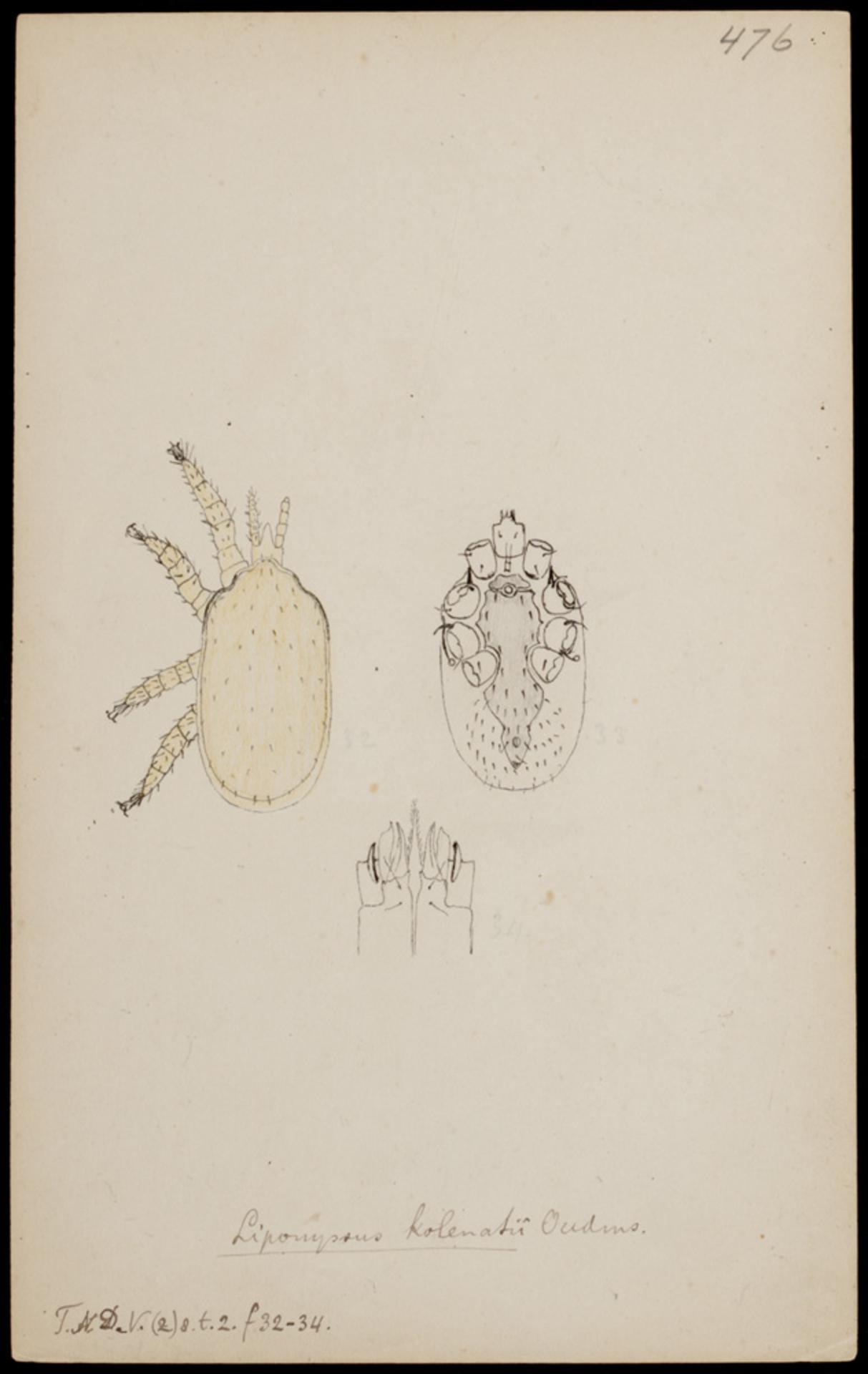
- Liponyssus kolenatii (Oudemans)

Scientific classification
- Kingdom: Animalia
- Phylum: Arthropoda
- Subphylum: Chelicerata
- Class: Arachnida
- Order: Mesostigmata
- Family: Macronyssidae
- Genus: Liponyssus; Kolenati, 1859

= Liponyssus =

Genus of mites

Liponyssus is a genus of bird mites in the family Macronyssidae. There are at least two described species in Liponyssus.

== Species ==
These two species belong to the genus Liponyssus:

- Liponyssus canadensis Banks
- Liponyssus cyclapsis Oudemans
