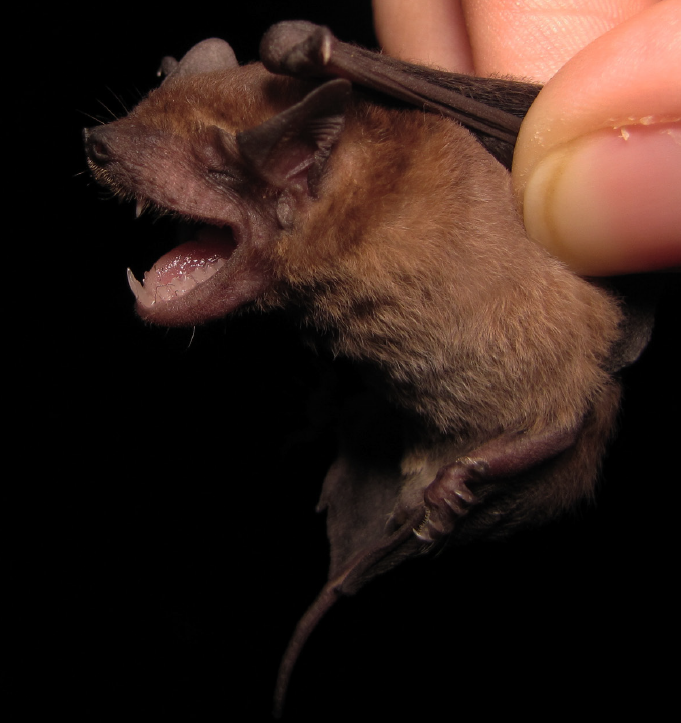
- Molossops temminckii

Scientific classification
- Kingdom: Animalia
- Phylum: Chordata
- Class: Mammalia
- Order: Chiroptera
- Family: Molossidae
- Genus: Molossops; Peters, 1865

Type species
- Dysopes temminckii Burmeister, 1854

= Molossops =

Genus of bats

Molossops (meaning: false molossus bat) is a genus of bat in the family Molossidae. The four member species are found in nearly every country of South America, with the dwarf dog-faced bat being found in the most countries. It contains only two species:

- Rufous dog-faced bat (Molossops neglectus)
- Dwarf dog-faced bat (Molossops temminckii)

Judith L. Eger writes that the genus only consists of M. neglectus and M. temminckii; M. aequatorianus Cabrera, 1917 (= Cabreramops Ibáñez, 1981) and M. mattogrossensis C. O. C. Vieira, 1942 (= Neoplatymops R. L. Peterson, 1965) were incorrectly assigned to this genus.
