= Trichosurolaelaps =

Scientific classification
- Domain: Eukaryota
- Kingdom: Animalia
- Phylum: Arthropoda
- Subphylum: Chelicerata
- Class: Arachnida
- Order: Mesostigmata
- Family: Laelapidae
- Genus: Trichosurolaelaps; Womersley, 1956

Genus of mites

Trichosurolaelaps is a genus of mites in the family Hirstionyssidae. The small macropod species Hypsiprymnodon moschatus, the musky rat kangaroo, is recorded as a host to species of this mite.

The following is a list of species names,

- Trichosurolaelaps crassipes Womersley, 1956
- Trichosurolaelaps dixous Domrow, 1972
- Trichosurolaelaps fallax Domrow, 1972
- Trichosurolaelaps harrisoni Domrow, 1961
- Trichosurolaelaps marra Domrow, 1972
- Trichosurolaelaps striatus Domrow, 1958
