= Lepidodorsum =

Scientific classification
- Kingdom: Animalia
- Phylum: Arthropoda
- Subphylum: Chelicerata
- Class: Arachnida
- Order: Mesostigmata
- Family: Macronyssidae
- Genus: Lepidodorsum; Saunders & Yunker, 1975
- Species: L. tiptoni

Binomial name
- Lepidodorsum tiptoni Saunders & Yunker, 1975

Genus of mites

Lepidodorsum is a genus of bird mites in the family Macronyssidae. There is at least one described species in Lepidodorsum, L. tiptoni.
