= Ophionyssus =

Scientific classification
- Domain: Eukaryota
- Kingdom: Animalia
- Phylum: Arthropoda
- Subphylum: Chelicerata
- Class: Arachnida
- Order: Mesostigmata
- Family: Macronyssidae
- Genus: Ophionyssus; Megnin, 1884

Genus of mites

Ophionyssus is a genus of bird mites in the family Macronyssidae. There are about seven described species in Ophionyssus.

== Species ==
These seven species belong to the genus Ophionyssus:

- Ophionyssus galeotes Domrow, Heath & Kennedy, 1980
- Ophionyssus javanensis Mich. & Lukoschus
- Ophionyssus lacertinus (Berlese, 1892)
- Ophionyssus natricis (Gervais, 1844)
- Ophionyssus saurarum (Oudemans, 1901)
- Ophionyssus schreibericolus
- Ophionyssus scincorum Domrow, Heath & Kennedy, 1980
