= Journal of Medical Entomology =

Peer-reviewed bimonthly scientific journal

- Discipline: Entomology
- Language: English
- Edited by: William K. Reisen

Publication details
- History: 1964–present
- Publisher: Oxford University Press for the Entomological Society of America (United States)
- Frequency: Bimonthly
- Impact factor: 1.712 (2015)

Standard abbreviations
- ISO 4: J. Med. Entomol.

Indexing
- CODEN: JMENA6
- ISSN: 0022-2585 (print); 1938-2928 (web)
- LCCN: 68041454
- OCLC no.: 01783323

Links
- Journal homepage; Online archive

The Journal of Medical Entomology is a peer-reviewed bimonthly scientific journal published by Oxford University Press for the Entomological Society of America. The journal publishes reports on all aspects of medical entomology and medical acarology. According to the Journal Citation Reports the journal has a 2014 impact factor of 1.953.
