= Pellonyssus =

Scientific classification
- Domain: Eukaryota
- Kingdom: Animalia
- Phylum: Arthropoda
- Subphylum: Chelicerata
- Class: Arachnida
- Order: Mesostigmata
- Family: Macronyssidae
- Genus: Pellonyssus; Clark & Yunker, 1956

Genus of mites

Pellonyssus is a genus of bird mites in the family Macronyssidae. There are at least three described species in Pellonyssus.

== Species ==
These three species belong to the genus Pellonyssus:

- Pellonyssus marui
- Pellonyssus passeri
- Pellonyssus reedi Zumpt & Patterson, 1952
