= Steatonyssus =

Scientific classification
- Domain: Eukaryota
- Kingdom: Animalia
- Phylum: Arthropoda
- Subphylum: Chelicerata
- Class: Arachnida
- Order: Mesostigmata
- Family: Macronyssidae
- Genus: Steatonyssus; Kolenati, 1858

Genus of mites

Steatonyssus is a genus of bat and bird mites in the family Macronyssidae. There are about eight described species in Steatonyssus.

== Species ==
These eight species belong to the genus Steatonyssus:

- Steatonyssus brucei
- Steatonyssus heteroventralis
- Steatonyssus musculi (Schrank, 1803)
- Steatonyssus nakazimai Asanuma & Uchikawa, 1977
- Steatonyssus occidentalis (Ewing, 1933)
- Steatonyssus periblepharus Kolenati, 1858
- Steatonyssus spinosus Willmann, 1936
- Steatonyssus surinamensis
