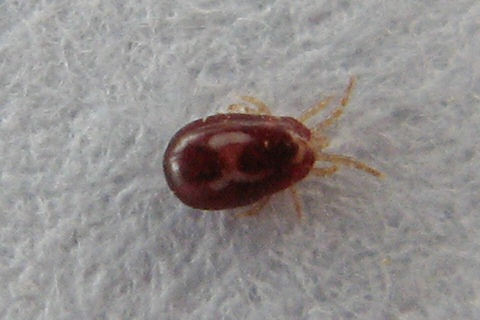
- Dermanyssus gallinae

Scientific classification
- Kingdom: Animalia
- Phylum: Arthropoda
- Subphylum: Chelicerata
- Class: Arachnida
- Order: Mesostigmata
- Superfamily: Dermanyssoidea
- Family: Dermanyssidae; Kolenati, 1859

= Dermanyssidae =

Family of mites

Dermanyssidae is a family of mites in the order Mesostigmata.

== Genera ==
- Acanthonyssus Yunker & Radovsky in Wenzel & Tipton 1966
  - Acanthonyssus dentipes (Strandtmann & Eads, 1947)
- Dermanyssus Dugès, 1834
  - Dermanyssus americanus Ewing, 1923
  - Dermanyssus antillarum Dusbabek & Cerny, 1971
  - Dermanyssus apodis Roy, Dowling, Chauve & Buronfonsse, 2009
  - Dermanyssus brevirivulus Gu & Ting, 1992
  - Dermanyssus brevis Ewing, 1936
  - Dermanyssus carpathicus Zeman, 1979
  - Dermanyssus chelidonis Oudemans, 1939
  - Dermanyssus faralloni Nelson & Furman, 1967
  - Dermanyssus gallinae (DeGeer, 1778)
  - Dermanyssus gallinoides Moss, 1966
  - Dermanyssus grochovskae Zemskaya
  - Dermanyssus hirsutus Moss & Radovsky, 1967
  - Dermanyssus hirundinis (Hermann, 1804)
  - Dermanyssus lacertarum (Contarini, 1847)
  - Dermanyssus longipes Berlese & Trouessart
  - Dermanyssus nipponensis Uchikawa & Kitaoka, 1981
  - Dermanyssus passerinus Berlese & Trouessart, 1889
  - Dermanyssus prognephilus Ewing, 1933
  - Dermanyssus quintus Vitzthum, 1921
  - Dermanyssus richiardii G. Canestrini & Fanzago, 1877
  - Dermanyssus rwandae Fain, 1993
  - Dermanyssus transvaalensis Evans & Till, 1962
  - Dermanyssus triscutatus Krantz, 1959
  - Dermanyssus trochilinis Moss, 1978
  - Dermanyssus wutaiensis Gu & Ting, 1992
- Draconyssus Yunker & Radovsky in Wenzel & Tipton 1966
  - Draconyssus belgicae Yunker & Radovsky in Wenzel & Tipton 1966
- Laelaspisella Marais & Loots, 1969
  - Laelaspisella epigynialis Marais & Loots, 1969
  - Laelaspisella foramenis (Karg, 1989)
- Liponyssoides Hirst, 1913
  - Liponyssoides adsonis Domrow, 1992
  - Liponyssoides bengalensis Gupta, 1979
  - Liponyssoides eudyptulae Fain & Galloway, 1993
  - Liponyssoides intermedius (Evans & Till, 1964)
  - Liponyssoides lukoschusi Domrow, 1979
  - Liponyssoides muris (Hirst, 1913)
  - Liponyssoides sanguineus (Hirst, 1914)
  - Liponyssoides warnekei Domrow, 1963
