= La Neuville-lès-Wasigny =

- Commune
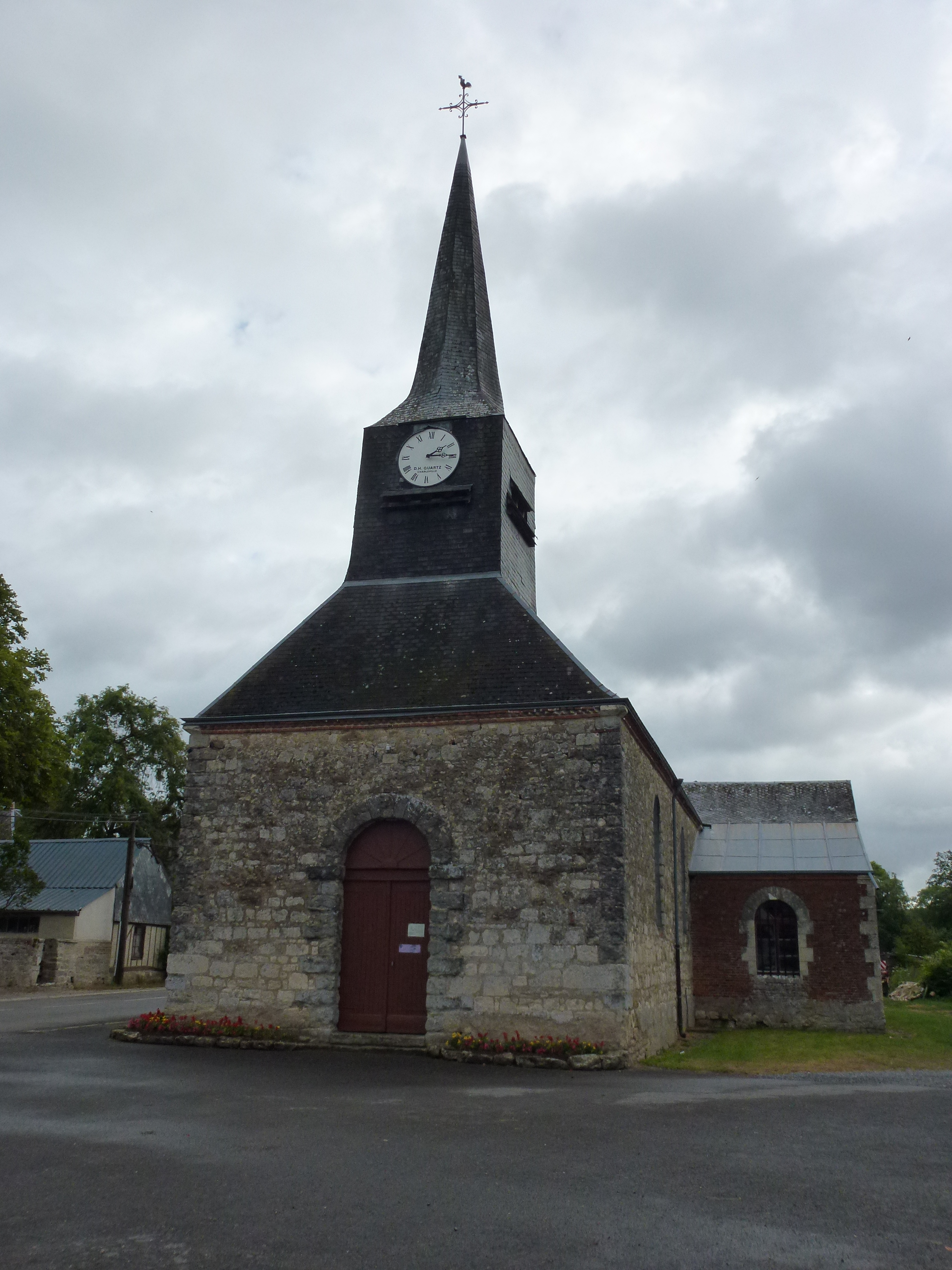
- The church in La Neuville-lès-Wasigny

- Coat of arms
- Location of La Neuville-lès-Wasigny
- Location within France Location within Grand Est
- Coordinates: 49°38′36″N 4°21′35″E
- Country: France
- Region: Grand Est
- Department: Ardennes
- Arrondissement: Rethel
- Canton: Signy-l'Abbaye
- Intercommunality: Crêtes Préardennaises

Government
  - Mayor (2020–2026): Nadine Marchand
- Area^{1}: 5.21 km^{2} (2.01 sq mi)
- Elevation: 120 m (390 ft)
- Highest elevation: 170 m (560 ft)
- Lowest elevation: 101 m (331 ft)
- Population (2023): 162
  - Density: 31.1/km^{2} (80.5/sq mi)
- Time zone: UTC+01:00 (CET)
  - Summer (DST): UTC+02:00 (CEST)
- INSEE/Postal code: 08323 /08270
- ^{1} French Land Register data, which excludes lakes, ponds, glaciers > 1 km^{2} (0.386 sq mi or 247 acres) and river estuaries.

La Neuville-lès-Wasigny is a commune in the Ardennes department in northern France.

== Population ==
Historical population
| Year | Pop. | ±% p.a. |
|---|---|---|
| 1968 | 191 | — |
| 1975 | 193 | +0.15% |
| 1982 | 181 | −0.91% |
| 1990 | 155 | −1.92% |
| 1999 | 129 | −2.02% |
| 2007 | 156 | +2.40% |
| 2012 | 178 | +2.67% |
| 2017 | 160 | −2.11% |
| 2023 | 162 | +0.21% |
Source: INSEE

== See also ==
- Communes of the Ardennes department
