= Entonyssidae =

Scientific classification
- Kingdom: Animalia
- Phylum: Arthropoda
- Subphylum: Chelicerata
- Class: Arachnida
- Order: Mesostigmata
- Family: Entonyssidae; Ewing, 1922

Family of mites

Entonyssidae is a small family of mites in the order Mesostigmata.

== Species ==
Entonyssidae contains seven genera, with nine recognized species:

- Genus Entonyssus Ewing, 1922
  - Entonyssus halli Ewing, 1922
  - Entonyssus koreansis Noh & Sohn, 1991
  - Entonyssus squamatus Fain, Kutzer & Fordinal, 1983
- Genus Cobrabyssus Fain, 1960
  - Cobrabyssus schoutedeni (Radford, 1953)
- Genus Entophiophaga Fain, 1960
  - Entophiophaga congolensis Fain, 1960
  - Entophiophaga scaphiophis Fain, 1960
  - Entophiophaga natriciterei Fain, 1960
  - Entophiophaga colubricola Fain, 1960
- Genus Entophioptes Fain, 1960
  - Entophioptes liophis Fain, 1960
- Genus Hamertonia Türk, 1947
  - Hamertonia bedfordi (Radford, 1937)
- Genus Ophiopneumicola Hubbard, 1938
  - Ophiopneumicola colubri Hubbard, 1938
- Genus Viperacarus Fain, 1960
  - Viperacarus europaeus Fain, 1960
