= Chiroptonyssus =

Scientific classification
- Domain: Eukaryota
- Kingdom: Animalia
- Phylum: Arthropoda
- Subphylum: Chelicerata
- Class: Arachnida
- Order: Mesostigmata
- Family: Macronyssidae
- Genus: Chiroptonyssus; Augustson, 1945
- Species: C. brennani

Binomial name
- Chiroptonyssus brennani Yunker, Lukoschus & Scheperboer

Genus of mites

Chiroptonyssus is a genus of bat and bird mites in the family Macronyssidae. There is at least five described species in Chiroptonyssus, C. brennani.
