= Pleurogenidae =

Scientific classification
- Kingdom: Animalia
- Phylum: Platyhelminthes
- Class: Trematoda
- Order: Plagiorchiida
- Suborder: Xiphidiata
- Superfamily: Microphalloidea
- Family: Pleurogenidae; Looss, 1899

Synonyms
- Urotrematidae

Family of flukes

Pleurogenidae is a family of trematodes belonging to the order Plagiorchiida.

Genera:

- Cortrema Tang, 1951
- Langeronia Caballero & Bravo-Hollis, 1949
- Nenimandijea Kaw, 1950
- Pleurogenes Looss, 1896
- Pleurogenoides Travassos, 1921
- Pseudosonsinotrema Dollfus, 1951
- Sinineobucephalopsis Zhang, Pan & Li, 1987
- Sinogastromyzontrema
- Urotrema Braun, 1900
- Urotrematulum Macy, 1933
