= Ixodorhynchidae =

Scientific classification
- Kingdom: Animalia
- Phylum: Arthropoda
- Subphylum: Chelicerata
- Class: Arachnida
- Order: Mesostigmata
- Family: Ixodorhynchidae; Ewing, 1923

Family of mites

Ixodorhynchidae is a small family of mites in the order Mesostigmata.

== Species ==
Ixodorhynchidae contains eight genera, with twelve recognized species:

- Genus Asiatolaelaps Fain, 1961
  - Asiatolaelaps evansi Fain, 1965
- Genus Chironobius H. A. P. M. Lombert & W. W. Moss, 1983
  - Chironobius alvus H. A. P. M. Lombert & W. W. Moss, 1983
  - Chironobius nordestinus Lizaso, 1983
- Genus Ixobioides Fonseca, 1934
  - Ixobioides brachispinosus (Lizaso, 1983)
  - Ixobioides butantanensis Fonseca, 1934
- Genus Ixodorhynchoides Johnston, 1962
  - Ixodorhynchoides truncatus Johnston, 1962
- Genus Ixodorhynchus Ewing, 1922
  - Ixodorhynchus liponyssoides Ewing, 1922
  - Ixodorhynchus piger (Berlese, 1917)
- Genus Ophiogongylus H. A. P. M. Lombert & W. W. Moss, 1983
  - Ophiogongylus breviscutum Lizaso, 1983
  - Ophiogongylus rotundus H. A. P. M. Lombert & W. W. Moss, 1983
- Genus Scutanolaelaps Lavoipierre, 1959
  - Scutanolaelaps ophidius Lavopierre, 1959
- Genus Strandtibbettsia Fain, 1961
  - Strandtibbettsia gordoni (Tibbetts, 1957)
