= Macronyssus =

Scientific classification
- Domain: Eukaryota
- Kingdom: Animalia
- Phylum: Arthropoda
- Subphylum: Chelicerata
- Class: Arachnida
- Order: Mesostigmata
- Family: Macronyssidae
- Genus: Macronyssus; Kolenati, 1858

Genus of mites

Macronyssus is a genus of bat and bird mites in the family Macronyssidae. There are about 14 described species in Macronyssus.

== Species ==
These 14 species belong to the genus Macronyssus:

- Macronyssus angustus
- Macronyssus coreanus (Ah)
- Macronyssus crosbyi
- Macronyssus flavus (Kolenati, 1857)
- Macronyssus granulosus (Kolenati, 1856)
- Macronyssus kolenatii (Oudemans, 1902)
- Macronyssus meridionalis Radovski
- Macronyssus rhinolophi (Oudemans, 1902)
- Macronyssus sibiricus Orlova & Zhigalin, 2015
- Macronyssus stanyukovichi Orlova & Zhigalin, 2015
- Macronyssus tieni (Grokhovskaya & Nguen-Huan-Hoe)
- Macronyssus tigirecus Orlova & Zhigalin, 2015
- Macronyssus uncinatus (Canestrini, 1885)
- Macronyssus unidens Radovski
