= Maximilian Braun =

German zoologist (1850–1930)

Maximilian Christian Gustav Carl Braun (30 September 1850, in Myslowitz – 19 February 1930, in Königsberg, today's Kaliningrad, in East Prussia) was a German anatomist and zoologist who specialized in the field of parasitology.

He studied medicine and natural sciences at the universities of Greifswald and Würzburg, receiving his medical doctorate in 1874 and his PhD in 1877. From 1880 he worked as a prosector at the institute of comparative anatomy at the Imperial University of Dorpat, and in 1883 became an associate professor. Later on, he served as a full professor of zoology and comparative anatomy at the universities of Rostock (1886–91) and Königsberg (from 1891). At Königsberg, he was director of the zoological museum. In 1916/17 he served as president of the German Zoological Society.

== Selected works ==
A few of his works on parasitology have been translated into English:

- The animal parasites of man; a handbook for students and medical men (1908).
- A handbook of practical parasitology (1910).

Other noted works by Braun include:

- Ueber die Histologischen Vorgänge bei der Häutung von Astacus fluviatilis, 1875 – On the histological processes during the mottling of Astacus fluviatilis.
- Das Urogenital-System der einheimischen Reptilien, 1877 – The urogenital system of native reptiles.
- Zur Entwicklungsgeschichte des breiten Bandwurmes, 1883 – Developmental history of the broad tapeworm.
- Physikalische und biologische Untersuchungen im westlichen Theile des finnischen Meerbusens, 1884 – Physical and biological studies in the western part of the Gulf of Finland.
- Zoologie, vergleichende anatomie und die entsprechenden sammlungen bei den universitäten Bützow und Rostock seit 1775, 1891 – Zoology, comparative anatomy and the corresponding collections at the universities of Rostock and Bützow since 1775.
- Die Umformung der Gliedmaßen bei den höheren Thieren, 1896 – The reshaping of limbs in higher animals.

From 1905 he was editor of journal Zoologische annalen: Zeitschrift für Geschichte der Zoologie.
