= Frank J. Radovsky =

American acarologist

- Born: January 5, 1929; Fall River, Massachusetts
- Died: October 21, 2010 (aged 81); Corvallis, Oregon
- Education: University of Colorado Boulder; University of California, Berkeley
- Partner: Irma née Simon
- Children: 2
- Scientific career
- Institutions: United States Navy; University of California, San Francisco; Bishop Museum; Oregon State University; North Carolina Museum of Natural Sciences

Frank Jay Radovsky (January 5, 1929 – October 21, 2010) was an American entomologist. He was especially interested in parasitic mites. He held the editor position of two journals: the Annual Review of Entomology and the Journal of Medical Entomology.

== Early life, education, and military service ==
Frank Jay Radovsky was born on January 5, 1929, in Fall River, Massachusetts as the youngest of twelve children. His father, David, had emigrated from Russia as a child and became a Harvard-educated lawyer. His mother, Minnie née Simon, was born in New York to Russian immigrants. Frank Radovsky was interested in the natural world from a young age; he collected insects, reptiles, and amphibians in his neighborhood and built terraria to study them. He attended the University of Colorado Boulder for a bachelor's in zoology, graduating in 1951. He then joined the United States Navy and served aboard the USS Floyd County during the Korean War. He achieved the rank of First Lieutenant and Gunnery Officer. He left active duty in 1955, though remained in the reserves through 1967.

After finishing his active duty in the Navy, Radovsky returned to school for a master's degree in parasitology at the University of California, Berkeley, graduating in 1959. He stayed at Berkeley for a PhD, also in parasitology, graduating in 1964.

== Academic career ==
Upon finishing his doctoral studies, his first position was as a research parasitologist and lecturer at the Hooper Foundation at the University of California, San Francisco. He worked there from 1963 to 1969. His next position was at the Bishop Museum in Honolulu, Hawaii from 1969 to 1986. His first title at the Bishop Museum was the Curator and Chair of Entomology, but he later became the Assistant and Interim Director of the Museum and then the Distinguished Chair of Zoology. This was followed by a year as a visiting professor of medical entomology at Oregon State University, then as the Director of Research and Collections at the North Carolina Museum of Natural Sciences, where he remained until 1992. The last years of his career were spent as a courtesy professor at Oregon State University, from 1994 until his death.

Radovsky had diverse scientific interests, and published on insects, parasites, mammals, and birds. He was particularly interested in parasitic mites within the order Mesostigmata, especially the family Macronyssidae. He was the editor of the Journal of Medical Entomology from 1970–1988 and the co-editor of the Annual Review of Entomology from 1991–1997. He held leadership positions within several scientific societies and organizations: he was president of the Hawaiian Entomological Society, on the board of directors of the Wau Ecology Institute, on the executive committee of the International Congress of Acarology, and also on the board of the Association of Systematics Collections.

== Personal life and death ==
While attending Berkeley, Radovsky met Irma née Simon in 1956. The couple married the following year. They had two daughters, Susan and Judith. He had a passion for stamp collecting, particularly stamps that depicted mammals. He also enjoyed reading the works of Shakespeare, Charles Darwin, Ernest Thompson Seton, C. S. Forester, and Patrick O'Brian. Radovsky died on October 21, 2010, at the age of 81 in Corvallis, Oregon.
