= 2023 in arthropod paleontology =

2023 in arthropod paleontology is a list of new arthropod fossil taxa, including arachnids, crustaceans, trilobites, and other arthropods (except insects, which have their own list) that were announced or described, as well as other significant arthropod paleontological discoveries and events which occurred in 2023.

== Chelicerates ==
=== Arachnids ===
==== Araneae ====
===== New Araneae taxa =====
Name	Novelty	Status	Authors	Age	Type locality	Country	Notes	Images
Arthrolycosa wolterbeeki	Sp. nov	Valid	Dunlop	Carboniferous (Moscovian)	Osnabrück Formation	Germany	A spider belonging to the family Arthrolycosidae.	
Balticonopsis duplo	Sp. nov	Valid	Wunderlich	Eocene	Baltic amber	Europe (Baltic Sea region)	A spider belonging to the family Anapidae.	
?Cornicaraneus unuspedipalpus	Sp. nov	Valid	Wunderlich	Cretaceous	Burmese amber	Myanmar	A spider belonging to the family Zarqaraneidae.	
Curvitibia pellucidus	Sp. nov	Valid	Wunderlich	Cretaceous	Burmese amber	Myanmar	A spider belonging to the family Zarqaraneidae.	
Electroblemma retroflectum	Sp. nov	Valid	Wunderlich	Cretaceous	Burmese amber	Myanmar	A spider belonging to the family Tetrablemmidae.	
Eocryphoeca amputata	Sp. nov	Valid	Wunderlich	Eocene	Baltic amber	Europe (Baltic Sea region)	A spider belonging to the family Cybaeidae.	
Eocryphoeca laesa	Sp. nov	Valid	Wunderlich	Eocene	Baltic amber	Europe (Baltic Sea region)	A spider belonging to the family Cybaeidae.	
Eomysmauchenius cretaceominimus	Sp. nov		Peng et al.	Cretaceous	Burmese amber	Myanmar	A spider belonging to the family Archaeidae.	
Esuritor duospinae	Sp. nov	Valid	Wunderlich	Eocene	Baltic amber	Europe (Baltic Sea region)	A nursery web spider.	
Esuritor nonincisio	Sp. nov	Valid	Wunderlich	Eocene	Baltic amber	Europe (Baltic Sea region)	A nursery web spider.	
Esuritor rovnoensis	Sp. nov	Valid	Wunderlich	Eocene	Rovno amber	Ukraine	A nursery web spider.	
Gibberaraneoid	Gen. et sp. nov	Valid	Wunderlich	Cretaceous	Burmese amber	Myanmar	A spider, probably a member of the family Zarqaraneidae. The type species is G. furcula.	
Insecutor angustidentes	Sp. nov	Valid	Wunderlich	Eocene	Baltic amber	Europe (Baltic Sea region)	A spider belonging to the family Insecutoridae.	
Insecutor cymbiumseta	Sp. nov	Valid	Wunderlich	Eocene	Baltic amber	Europe (Baltic Sea region)	A spider belonging to the family Insecutoridae.	
Kachinblemma	Gen. et sp. nov	Valid	Wunderlich	Cretaceous	Burmese amber	Myanmar	A spider belonging to the family Tetrablemmidae. The type species is K. constrictum.	
Megamonodontium	Gen. et sp. nov	Valid	McCurry, Frese & Raven	Miocene	McGraths Flat site	Australia	A spider belonging to the family Barychelidae. The type species is M. mccluskyi.	
Myanmarmysmena	Gen. et sp. nov	Valid	Wunderlich	Cretaceous	Burmese amber	Myanmar	A spider, possibly a member of the family Mysmenidae. The type species is M. grandipalpus.	
Nanoaenigma	Gen. et sp. nov	Valid	Wunderlich	Cretaceous	Burmese amber	Myanmar	A symphytognathidan Araneoidea spider the type genus of the new family Nanoaenigmatidae. The type species is N. pumilio.	
Opellianus fissura	Sp. nov	Valid	Wunderlich	Eocene	Baltic amber	Europe (Baltic Sea region)	A spider belonging to the family Uloboridae.	
Palaeophantes	Gen. et sp. nov	Valid	Wunderlich	Eocene	Baltic amber	Europe (Baltic Sea region)	A spider belonging to the family Linyphiidae. The type species is P. paracymbium.	
Parakachin	Gen. et sp. nov	Valid	Wunderlich	Cretaceous	Burmese amber	Myanmar	A spider belonging to the family Uloboridae. The type species is P. pectunculus.	
Parvimegasetae	Gen. et sp. nov	Valid	Wunderlich	Cretaceous	Burmese amber	Myanmar	A spider belonging to the family Megasetidae. The type species is P. araneoides.	
Promacrothele	Gen. et sp. nov		Tang, Engel & Yang in Tang et al.	Cretaceous	Burmese amber	Myanmar	A spider belonging to the family Macrothelidae. The type species is P. polyacantha.	
Scutcybaeus	Gen. et sp. nov	Valid	Wunderlich	Eocene	Baltic amber	Europe (Baltic Sea region)	A spider belonging to the family Cybaeidae. The type species is S. brevitricha.	
Scytodes daniloharms	Sp. nov	Valid	Wunderlich	Eocene	Baltic amber	Europe (Baltic Sea region)	A species of Scytodes spitting spider.	
?Scytodes nonalta	Sp. nov	Valid	Wunderlich	Cretaceous	Burmese amber	Myanmar	A spitting spider.	
Spinatibia	Gen. et sp. nov	Valid	Wunderlich	Eocene	Baltic amber	Europe (Baltic Sea region)	A spider belonging to the family Liocranidae. The types species is S. curvitibia.	
Spinipalpitibia occulta	Sp. nov	Valid	Wunderlich	Cretaceous	Burmese amber	Myanmar	A spider belonging to the family Protoaraneoididae.	
Succinaria	Gen. et 2 sp. nov	Valid	Wunderlich	Eocene	Baltic amber	Europe (Baltic Sea region)	A spider belonging to the family Cybaeidae. The type species is S. lingua; genus might also include S? adcoccinoidea.	
Unguistegenaria	Gen. et sp. nov	Valid	Wunderlich	Eocene	Baltic amber	Europe (Baltic Sea region)	A spider belonging to the family Agelenidae. The type species is U. sinemammillae.	

===== Araneae research =====
- The first known male specimen of Strotarchus paradoxus is described from the Miocene Mexican amber by García-Villafuerte & Ibarra-Núñez (2023).
- A study on the phylogenetic relationships of extant and fossil members of Palpimanoidea is published by Wood & Wunderlich (2023), who interpret their findings as indicative of closer relationships of palpimanoids from the Cretaceous amber from Myanmar with the Gondwanan taxa, and indicative of dispersal of Gondwanan lineages through the Burma terrane into the Holarctic in the Cretaceous.
- Richardson, McCurry & Frese (2023) describe fossil material of a member of the genus Simaetha from the Miocene of Australia, interpreted as consistent with the molecular-based studies indicating that the radiation of the astioid jumping spiders at the Oligocene/Miocene transition happened in Australasia.

==== Chimerarachnida ====
Name	Novelty	Status	Authors	Age	Type locality	Country	Notes	Images
Chimerarachne alexbeigel	Sp. nov	Valid	Wunderlich	Cretaceous	Burmese amber	Myanmar		
Chimerarachne patrickmueller	Sp. nov	Valid	Wunderlich	Cretaceous	Burmese amber	Myanmar		
Chimerarachne spiniflagellum	Sp. nov	Valid	Wunderlich	Cretaceous	Burmese amber	Myanmar		

==== Ixodida ====
===== New Ixodida taxa =====
Name	Novelty	Status	Authors	Age	Type locality	Country	Notes	Images
Archaeocroton kaufmani	Sp. nov	Valid	Chitimia-Dobler, Mans & Dunlop in Chitimia-Dobler et al.	Cretaceous	Burmese amber	Myanmar	A hard tick. Announced in 2022; the final article version was published in 2023.	
Bothriocroton muelleri	Sp. nov	Valid	Chitimia-Dobler, Mans & Dunlop in Chitimia-Dobler et al.	Cretaceous	Burmese amber	Myanmar	A hard tick. Announced in 2022; the final article version was published in 2023.	

===== Ixodida research =====
- New specimens of Compluriscutula vetulum, providing new information on the morphology of this tick, are described from the Cretaceous amber from Myanmar by Chitimia-Dobler et al. (2023).

==== Mesostigmata ====
Name	Novelty	Status	Authors	Age	Type locality	Country	Notes	Images
Uropodella hoffeinsorum	Sp. nov	Valid	Lindquist & Vorontsov	Eocene	Baltic amber	Usedom	A mesostigmataan mite, a species of Uropodella.	

==== Opiliones ====
Name	Novelty	Status	Authors	Age	Type locality	Country	Notes	Images
Foveacorpus	Gen. et 2 sp. nov	Valid	Bartel, Dunlop & Giribet	Cretaceous	Burmese amber	Myanmar	A member of Opiliones belonging to the group Cyphophthalmi. Genus includes F. cretaceus and F. parvus.	
Leptopsalis breyeri	Sp. nov	Valid	Bartel, Dunlop & Giribet	Cretaceous	Burmese amber	Myanmar	A member of Opiliones belonging to the family Stylocellidae.	
Mesopsalis	Gen. et sp. nov	Valid	Bartel, Dunlop & Giribet	Cretaceous	Burmese amber	Myanmar	A member of Opiliones belonging to the group Cyphophthalmi. Genus includes M. oblongus.	
Sirocellus	Gen. et sp. nov	Valid	Bartel, Dunlop & Giribet	Cretaceous	Burmese amber	Myanmar	A cyphophthalmine Opiliones; Genus with a combination of sironid and stylocellid traits. The type species is S. iunctus.	
Tyrannobunus	Gen. et sp. nov	Valid	Bartel & Dunlop	Cretaceous	Burmese amber	Myanmar	A eupnoid harvestman. The type species is T. aculeus.	

==== Oribatida ====
Name	Novelty	Status	Authors	Age	Type locality	Country	Notes	Images
Cerachipteria ahsokatanoae	Sp. nov	Valid	Arillo, Subías & Huang	Cretaceous	Burmese amber	Myanmar	A mite belonging to the family Achipteriidae.	

==== Pseudoscorpions ====
Name	Novelty	Status	Authors	Age	Type locality	Country	Notes	Images
Ajkagarypinus	Gen. et sp. nov		Novák et al.	Late Cretaceous (Santonian)	Ajka Coal Formation	Hungary	A pseudoscorpion belonging to the family Garypinidae. The type species is A. stephani.	
Baltamblyolpium	Gen. et 2 sp. nov	Valid	Stanczak et al.	Eocene	Baltic amber	Germany; Lithuania	A pseudoscorpion belonging to the family Garypinidae. The type species is B. gizmotum from the Baltic amber The genus also includes B. grabenhorsti from the Bitterfeld amber.	
Chthonius marusiki	Sp. nov		Turbanov et al.	Eocene	Rovno amber	Ukraine	A pseudoscorpion, a species of Chthonius.	

==== Sarcoptiformes ====
Name	Novelty	Status	Authors	Age	Type locality	Country	Notes	Images
Congovidia glesoconomorphi	Sp. nov	Valid	Kolesnikov et al.	Eocene	Rovno amber	Ukraine	A mite belonging to the family Hemisarcoptidae	
Sarcoptes kutchensis	Sp. nov		Agnihotri et al.	Eocene		India	A sarcoptid mite.	

==== Scorpiones ====
===== New Scorpiones taxa =====
Name	Novelty	Status	Authors	Age	Type locality	Country	Notes	Images
Archaeoscorpiops grossei	Sp. nov	Valid	Lourenço in Lourenço & Velten	Cretaceous	Burmese amber	Myanmar	A scorpion belonging to the family Palaeoeuscorpiidae.	
Betaburmesebuthus fuscus	Sp. nov	Valid	Xuan, Cai & Huang	Cretaceous	Burmese amber	Myanmar	A scorpion belonging to the family Palaeoburmesebuthidae.	
Betaburmesebuthus villosus	Sp. nov	Valid	Xuan, Cai & Huang	Cretaceous	Burmese amber	Myanmar	A scorpion belonging to the family Palaeoburmesebuthidae.	
Cretaceousbuthus petersi	Sp. nov	Valid	Lourenço in Lourenço & Velten	Cretaceous	Burmese amber	Myanmar	A scorpion belonging to the superfamily Buthoidea.	
Cretaceoushormiops elegans	Sp. nov		Xuan et al.	Cretaceous	Burmese amber	Myanmar	A scorpion belonging to the family Protoischnuridae.	
Protobuthus ziliolii	Sp. nov	Valid	Viaretti, Bindellini & Dal Sasso	Middle Triassic	Besano Formation	Italy	A scorpion belonging to the superfamily Buthoidea and the family Protobuthidae.	

===== Scorpiones research =====
- Dunlop & Garwood (2023) reevaluate purported Paleozoic scorpion taxa Palaeophonus arctus and Palaeophonus lightbodyi, considering them both to be nomina dubia, and consider the genus Allopalaeophonus to be a junior synonym of the genus Palaeophonus.
- The oldest pectinal tooth of a scorpion reported to date, preserved with small projections in sockets consistent with the peg sensilla of extant scorpions, is described from the Devonian (Emsian) strata in Scotland (United Kingdom) by Dunlop et al. (2023).

==== Solifugae ====
Name	Novelty	Status	Authors	Age	Type locality	Country	Notes	Images
Eognosippus	Gen. et sp. nov	Valid	Dunlop, Erdek & Bartel	Eocene (Lutetian)	Baltic amber	Europe (Baltic Sea region, ?Russia)	A camel spider. The type species is E. fahrenheitiana.	

==== Trigonotarbida ====
===== Trigonotarbida research =====
- A trigonotarbid arachnid specimen is described from the Carboniferous (Moscovian) Almazna Formation (Donetsk Oblast) by Dunlop & Dernov (2023), extending known distribution of trigonotarbids in Europe.

==== Trombidiformes ====
Name	Novelty	Status	Authors	Age	Type locality	Country	Notes	Images
Unguicheylus	Gen. et sp. nov	Valid	Khaustov, Vorontsov & Lindquist	Cretaceous (Albian–Cenomanian)	Taimyr amber	Russia	A mite belonging to the new family Unguicheylidae, which might belong to the superfamily Anystoidea. The type species is U. quadriocellatus.	

==== Uropygi ====
===== New Uropygi taxa =====
Name	Novelty	Status	Authors	Age	Type locality	Country	Notes	Images
Crethypoctonus	Gen. et sp. nov		Zhou et al.	Late Cretaceous (Cenomanian)	Burmese amber	Myanmar	A member of Uropygi belonging to the family Thelyphonidae. The type species is C. kachinus.	
Parilisthelyphonus	Gen. et sp. nov		Knecht et al.	Carboniferous (Moscovian)	Rhode Island Formation	United States (Massachusetts)	A whip scorpion. The type species is P. bryantae.	

===== Uropygi research =====
- A study on the anatomy and affinities of Geralinura brittanica and Proschizomus petrunkevitchi is published by Garwood & Dunlop (2023), who reinterpret P. petrunkevitchi as a whip scorpion rather than a stem-schizomid.
- Probable new specimen of Mesoproctus rowlandi, representing the first fossil whip scorpion specimen preserved with book lungs, is described from the Lower Cretaceous Crato Formation (Brazil) by Alberto et al. (2023).

=== Eurypterids ===
==== New eurypterid taxa ====
Name	Novelty	Status	Authors	Age	Type locality	Country	Notes	Images
Archopterus	Gen et sp. nov	Valid	Wang et al.	Ordovician	Wenchang Formation	China	Likely the oldest adelophthalmid. The type species is A. anjiensis.	

==== Eurypterid research ====
- Braddy (2023) reviews evidence for the predatory abilities of pterygotid eurypterids, and interprets them as likely slow swimming vagrant and ambush predators, with different taxa adapted to feeding on different types of prey.
- Bicknell, Kenny & Plotnick (2023) present a new, three-dimensional reconstruction of Acutiramus.

=== Xiphosurans ===
==== Xiphosuran research ====
- A study on the evolution of the developmental patterns of xiphosurans is published by Lustri et al. (2023), who find evidence of changes in the allometric growth of xiphosurans related to adaptations to different environments, but also report that the studied changes were relatively minor compared to the diversity of patterns of allometric growth observed in eurypterids and chasmataspidids.
- Klompmaker et al. (2023) describe a specimen of Limulitella bronnii from the Anisian Muschelkalk sediments of the Vossenveld Formation (Netherlands), extending known temporal range of this species, and provide the diagnosis of L. bronnii for the first time.

=== Other chelicerates ===
- Siveter et al. (2023) describe two new specimens of Haliestes dasos from the Silurian Coalbrookdale Formation (United Kingdom), interpret their anatomy as indicative of adaptation of the studied species to a different mode of feeding than in living sea spiders, as well as possibly indicative of the presence of sexual dimorphism, and assign H. dasos to the stem group rather than the crown group of Pycnogonida.
- Revision of the Callovian sea spider taxa from the La Voulte-sur-Rhône (France) is published by Sabroux et al. (2023), who assign the studied fossil to Pantopoda, crown-group Pycnogonida, assign Palaeopycnogonides gracilis to the new family Palaeopycnogonididae, and interpret Colossopantopodus boissinensis and Palaeoendeis elmii as members of the families Colossendeidae and Endeidae, respectively.

== Crustaceans ==
=== Malacostracans ===
==== New malacostracan taxa ====
Name	Novelty	Status	Authors	Age	Type locality	Country	Notes	Images
Albaidaplax	Gen. et sp. nov	Valid	Garassino, Pasini & Castro	Pliocene to early Pleistocene		Italy; Spain	A goneplacid crab. The type species is Albaidaplax ispalensis. Announced in 2013; validated in 2023.	
Annieporcellana paleocenica	Sp. nov	Valid	Yost, Feldmann & Schweitzer	Paleocene	Kambühel Formation	Austria	A member of Galatheoidea belonging to the family Catillogalatheidae.	
Anthracophausia rheamsi	Sp. nov	Valid	Vohs, Feldmann & Schweitzer	Carboniferous (Pennsylvanian)		United States (Alabama)	A malacostracan of uncertain affinities.	
Austropotamobius plenicari	Sp. nov	Valid	Gašparič et al.	Miocene (Messinian)		Slovenia	A species of Austropotamobius.	
Bahiacaris	Gen. et comb. nov	Valid	Schweitzer et al.	Early Cretaceous (Aptian)		Brazil	A caridean shrimp; a new genus for "Atyoida" roxoi Beurlen (1950). Announced in 2019; validated in 2023.	
Balsscallichirus bericensis	Sp. nov	Valid	Coole & De Angeli	Oligocene (Rupelian)		Italy	A member of the family Callianassidae.	
Balsscallichirus soghensis	Sp. nov	Valid	Coole & De Angeli	Oligocene (Rupelian)		Italy	A member of the family Callianassidae.	
Bechleja brevirostris	Sp. nov	Valid	De Mazancourt, Wappler & Wedmann	Eocene	Messel pit	Germany	Possibly a member of the family Palaemonidae. Announced in 2022; the correction including evidence of registration in ZooBank was published in 2023.	
Bericorystes	Gen. et sp. nov	Valid	De Angeli	Eocene		Italy	A crab belonging to the family Corystidae. The type species is B. caporiondoi.	
Bournelyreidus paredonensis	Sp. nov		Vega, Nyborg & Garassino	Late Cretaceous (Maastrichtian)	Potrerillos Formation	Mexico	A crab belonging to the family Lyreididae.	
Braggicarpilius wanzenboecki	Sp. nov	Valid	Miller, Schweitzer & Feldmann	Paleocene	Kambühel Formation	Austria	A crab belonging to the family Carpiliidae.	
Callianassa ocozocoautlaensis	Sp. nov	Valid	Hyžný, Vega & Coutiño	Late Cretaceous (Maastrichtian)	Ocozocoautla Formation	Mexico	A member of Callianassidae, a species of Callianassa (sensu lato). Announced in 2013; validated in 2023.	
Campanaxius	Gen. et sp. nov	Valid	Nyborg, Hyžný & Haggart	Late Cretaceous (Campanian)	Cedar District Formation	United States (Washington)	A member of Axiidea. The type species is C. raffi.	
Cancer zameniscus	Sp. nov	Valid	Feldmann, Schweitzer & Casadío	Miocene		Argentina	A species of Cancer.	
Chaceon marcorilobus	Sp. nov	Valid	Feldmann, Schweitzer & Casadío	Miocene		Argentina	A species of Chaceon.	
Cherusius marangoni	Sp. nov	Valid	De Angeli	Eocene		Italy	A crab belonging to the family Domeciidae.	
Coahuilanina	Gen. et sp. nov		Vega, Nyborg & Garassino	Late Cretaceous (Maastrichtian)	Potrerillos Formation	Mexico	A crab belonging to the family Raninidae. The type species is C. difuntaensis.	
Chronocancer	Gen. et sp. nov	Valid	Santana et al.	Early Cretaceous (Aptian-Albian)	Romualdo Formation	Brazil	A crab, probably a member of the family Orithopsidae. The type species is C. camilosantanai. Announced in 2022 in an online-only journal, and the publication did not include a ZooBank registration number; validated in 2023.	
Corystites orgianensis	Sp. nov	Valid	De Angeli	Eocene		Italy	A crab belonging to the family Corystidae.	
Costacopluma squiresi	Sp. nov	Valid	Nyborg, Vega & Filkorn	Paleocene	Santa Susana Formation	United States (California)	A retroplumid crab. Announced in 2009; validated in 2023.	
Cretacocalcinus fortis	Sp. nov		Ferratges & Zamora in García-Penas et al.	Early Cretaceous	Maestrazgo Basin	Spain	A hermit crab.	
Cretalamoha	Gen. et sp. nov	Valid	Nyborg, Garassino & Vega	Late Cretaceous (Campanian)	Pender Formation	Canada (British Columbia)	A member of Homolidae. The type species is C. boweni. Announced in 2017; validated in 2023.	
Cugocaris	Gen. et sp. nov	Valid	Liu et al.	Silurian	Fentou Formation	China	A member of Phyllocarida belonging to the group Archaeostraca. Genus includes new species C. future.	
Dardanus cyprioticus	Sp. nov	Valid	Wallaard et al.	Miocene (Serravallian-Messinian)	Pakhna Formation	Cyprus	A species of Dardanus.	
Dardanus plevrotos	Sp. nov	Valid	Wallaard et al.	Miocene (Serravallian-Messinian)	Pakhna Formation	Cyprus	A species of Dardanus.	
Diaulax rosablanca	Sp. nov	Valid	Gómez-Cruz, Bermúdez & Vega	Early Cretaceous (Valanginian)	Rosablanca Formation	Colombia	A dromioid crab. Announced in 2015; validated in 2023.	
Dinocarcinus	Gen. et sp. nov	Valid	Van Bakel et al.	Late Cretaceous (late Campanian)		France	A crab, a member of Portunoidea sensu lato. The type species is D. velauciensis. Announced in 2019; validated in 2023.	
Disspinamithrax	Gen. et sp. nov	Valid	Feldmann, Schweitzer & Casadío	Oligocene		Argentina	A member of the family Mithracidae. The type species is D. santacruzensis.	
Dromiopsis aedicula	Sp. nov	Valid	Miller, Schweitzer & Feldmann	Paleocene	Kambühel Formation	Austria	A crab belonging to the family Dromiidae.	
Dromiopsis bullamelga	Sp. nov	Valid	Miller, Schweitzer & Feldmann	Paleocene	Kambühel Formation	Austria	A crab belonging to the family Dromiidae.	
Dubiostenopus	Gen. et sp. nov	Valid	Alencar et al.	Early Cretaceous (Aptian-Albian)	Romualdo Formation	Brazil	A member of Stenopodidea of uncertain affinities. The type species is D. parvus.	
Enoploclytia tepeyacensis	Sp. nov	Valid	Vega, Garassino & Zapata-Jaime	Late Cretaceous (Campanian)		Mexico	An erymid, a species of Enoploclytia. Announced in 2013; validated in 2023.	
Eobooralana	Gen. et comb. nov		Schädel, Nagler & Hyžný	Middle Jurassic (Callovian)		France	An isopod belonging to the group Scutocoxifera. The type species is "Urda" rhodanica Van Straelen (1928).	
Eomunidopsis kinokunica	Sp. nov	Valid	Karasawa, Ohara & Kato	Early Cretaceous (Barremian)	Arida Formation	Japan	A member of the family Galatheidae. Announced in 2008 in an online-only journal, prior to electronic-only publications being allowed under ICZN; validated in 2023.	
Eoparanaxia	Gen. et sp. nov	Valid	Ferratges et al.	Eocene	Pamplona Marls Formation	Spain	A crab belonging to the family Epialtidae and the subfamily Pisinae. The type species is E. eocenica.	
Eopolyonyx	Gen. et sp. nov	Valid	Tessier, Busulini & Beschin	Eocene (Priabonian)		Italy	A porcelain crab. The type species is E. bretoni.	
Eryma nippon	Sp. nov	Valid	Karasawa, Ohara & Kato	Early Cretaceous (Barremian)	Arida Formation	Japan	Announced in 2008 in an online-only journal, prior to electronic-only publications being allowed under ICZN; validated in 2023.	
Eurynome bandurriasensis	Sp. nov	Valid	Feldmann, Schweitzer & Casadío	Miocene		Argentina	A member of the family Majidae.	
Garrafosopon	Gen. et comb. nov		Ossó, van Bakel & Artal in Ossó et al.	Early Cretaceous (Aptian)		United Kingdom	The type species is G. angustus (Wright & Collins, 1972)	
Gladiocaris	Gen. et comb. nov	Valid	Garassino et al.	Middle Triassic	Trochitenkalk Formation	Germany	A member of the family Penaeidae. Genus includes "Antrimpos" germanicus Brandt & Schulz (2013)	
Glyphea pisuergae	Sp. nov		Charbonnier, Garassino & López-Horgue	Early Jurassic (Pliensbachian–Toarcian)		Spain		
Gonatocaris wuhanensis	Sp. nov	Valid	Liu et al.	Silurian	Fentou Formation	China	A member of Phyllocarida belonging to the group Archaeostraca.	
Hepatus beurleni	Nom. nov	Valid	Lima et al.	Miocene	Pirabas Formation	Brazil	A species of Hepatus; a replacement name for Cyclocancer tuberculatus Beurlen (1958).	
Hoploparia natsumiae	Sp. nov	Valid	Karasawa, Ohara & Kato	Early Cretaceous (Barremian)	Arida Formation	Japan	Announced in 2008 in an online-only journal, prior to electronic-only publications being allowed under ICZN; validated in 2023.	
Iberodorippe	Gen. et sp. nov		Ossó, van Bakel & Artal in Ossó et al.	Early Cretaceous (Aptian)		Spain	The type species is I. vinea.	
Jaliscosphaera	Gen. et sp. nov		García-Vázquez, Alvarado-Ortega & Vega	Pliocene		Mexico	An isopod belonging to the family Sphaeromatidae. The type species is J. pliocenica.	
Laeviprosopon ewakrzeminskae	Sp. nov	Valid	Starzyk et al.	Late Jurassic (Tithonian)	Ernstbrunn Formation	Austria	A crab belonging to the family Homolidae.	
Laeviprosopon joecollinsi	Sp. nov	Valid	Starzyk et al.	Late Jurassic (Oxfordian)		Poland	A crab belonging to the family Homolidae.	
Laeviprosopon lanceatum	Sp. nov	Valid	Starzyk et al.	Late Jurassic (Oxfordian)		Poland	A crab belonging to the family Homolidae.	
Litorepagurus	Gen. et sp. nov	Valid	Fraaije et al.	Early Cretaceous (Albian)		France	A hermit crab. Genus includes new species L. wissantensis.	
Mecochirus cenomanicus	Sp. nov	Valid	Charbonnier et al.	Late Cretaceous (Cenomanian)		France	A member of the family Mecochiridae.	
Meroncarcinus	Gen. et sp. nov	In press	Van Bakel & Guinot	Middle Jurassic (Callovian)		France	A crab belonging to the family Glaessneropsidae. The type species is M. boursicoti.	
Mesodromilites prietoi	Sp. nov		Ossó, van Bakel & Artal in Ossó et al.	Early Cretaceous (Aptian)		Spain		
Mesolambrus vallionensis	Sp. nov	Valid	De Angeli	Eocene		Italy	A crab belonging to the family Parthenopidae.	
Metacirolana jimlowryi	Sp. nov	Valid	Bruce & Rodcharoen	Cretaceous	Burmese amber	Myanmar	An isopod belonging to the family Cirolanidae.	
Metanephrops serendipitus	Sp. nov	Valid	Gašparič et al.	Miocene		Slovenia	A species of Metanephrops. Announced in 2021; validated in 2023.	
Meyeria hurtrelleorum	Sp. nov	Valid	Charbonnier et al.	Late Jurassic (Oxfordian)		France	A member of the family Mecochiridae.	
Miohepatus amazonicus	Comb. nov	Valid	Lima et al.	Miocene	Pirabas Formation	Brazil	A crab belonging to the family Aethridae. Moved from Hepatella amazonica Beurlen (1958). The type species of the new genus Miohepatus, which also includes extant species Miohepatus peruvianus (originally Hepatella peruviana Rathbun, 1933)	
Mutotylaspis	Gen. et sp. nov		Fraaije et al.	Early Cretaceous (Albian)		Russia (Vladimir Oblast)	A hermit crab belonging to the family Probeebeidae. The type species is M. tripudium.	
Necrocarcinus gorbenkoi	Sp. nov	Valid	Mychko et al.	Late Cretaceous (Cenomanian)	Lyamino Formation	Russia (Moscow Oblast)	A crab belonging to the group Raninoida.	
Necrocarcinus mariae	Sp. nov		Ossó, van Bakel & Artal in Ossó et al.	Early Cretaceous (Aptian)		Spain		
Nectocarcinus verruculus	Sp. nov	Valid	Feldmann, Schweitzer & Casadío	Miocene		Argentina		
Ophthalmoplax andina	Sp. nov	Valid	Guzmán et al.	Late Cretaceous (Campanian)	Lodolitas de Aguacaliente Formation	Colombia	A member of Macropipidae, a species of Ophthalmoplax. Announced in 2016; validated in 2023.	
Oregonina	Gen. et comb. nov	Valid	Nyborg, Garassino & Nyborg	Eocene; Middle Eocene	Yamhill Formation	United States (Oregon)	A lyreidid crab. The type species is "Macroacaena" leucosiae (Rathbun, 1932)	
Osonacarcinus	Gen. et sp. nov	Valid	Artal, Onetti & Ossó	Eocene (Lutetian)		Spain	A crab belonging to the family Pseudoziidae. The type species is O. lenis.	
Ostenosculda	Gen. et sp. nov	Valid	Braig et al.	Early Jurassic (Sinemurian)	Moltrasio Formation	Italy	A mantis shrimp belonging to the group Unipeltata. The type species is O. teruzzii.	
Paguristes timoni	Sp. nov	Valid	Wallaard et al.	Miocene (Tortonian)	St. Marys Formation	United States (Maryland)	A hermit crab, a species of Paguristes.	
Pagurus? garrafensis	Sp. nov		Ossó, van Bakel & Artal in Ossó et al.	Early Cretaceous (Aptian)		Spain	A hermit crab, possibly a species of Pagurus.	
Pagurus hazenorum	Sp. nov	Valid	Wallaard et al.	Miocene (Tortonian)	St. Marys Formation	United States (Maryland)	A hermit crab, a species of Pagurus.	
Palaega yamadai	Sp. nov	Valid	Karasawa, Ohara & Kato	Early Cretaceous (Barremian)	Arida Formation	Japan	An isopod belonging to the family Cirolanidae. Announced in 2008 in an online-only journal, prior to electronic-only publications being allowed under ICZN; validated in 2023.	
Palaeodromites pimientai	Sp. nov		Ferratges & Zamora in García-Penas et al.	Early Cretaceous	Maestrazgo Basin	Spain	A crab belonging to the family Dromiidae and the subfamily Goniodromitinae. Originally described as a species of Palaeodromites; Ossó et al. (2025) transferred it to the genus Distefania.	
Palaeosynaxes	Gen. et sp. nov	Valid	Fraaije et al.	Late Jurassic (Oxfordian)		Poland	A furry lobster. The type species is P. montserratae.	
Paromola roseburgensis	Sp. nov	Valid	Nyborg, Garassino & Vega	Early Eocene	Roseburg Formation	United States	A member of Homolidae. Announced in 2017; validated in 2023.	
Percnon paleogenicus	Sp. nov	Valid	De Angeli	Eocene		Italy	A species of Percnon.	
Petersbuchia	Gen. et sp. nov	Valid	Schweigert	Late Jurassic (Kimmeridgian)	Treuchtlingen Formation	Germany	A crab belonging to the group Homolodromioidea and the family Prosopidae. The type species is P. thauckei. Announced in 2021 in an online-only journal; validated in 2023.	
Petrolisthes mitseroensis	Sp. nov	Valid	Wallaard et al.	Miocene (Serravallian-Messinian)	Pakhna Formation	Cyprus	A species of Petrolisthes.	
Phrynolambrus sagittalis	Sp. nov	Valid	Ferratges et al.	Eocene	Pamplona Formation	Spain	A crab belonging to the family Parthenopidae and the subfamily Dairoidinae.	
Pirabacarcinus	Gen. et sp. nov		Lima et al.	Miocene	Pirabas Formation	Brazil	A crab belonging to the family Pilumnidae. The type species is P. iara.	
Planobranchia elongata	Sp. nov	Valid	Ferratges et al.	Eocene	Pamplona Marls Formation	Spain	A crab belonging to the family Epialtidae and the subfamily Pisinae.	
Protomunida kambuehelensis	Sp. nov	Valid	Yost, Feldmann & Schweitzer	Paleocene	Kambühel Formation	Austria	A member of the family Munididae.	
Pseudoglyphea anisica	Sp. nov	Valid	Pasini, Garassino & Charbonnier	Middle Triassic (Anisian)		Italy	A litogastrid lobster.	
Rogueus belgodereae	Sp. nov	Valid	Van Bakel, Ossó & Téodori	Paleocene (Thanetian)		France	A crab belonging to the group Raninoidea and the family Lyreididae.	
Sandiegocalcinus	Gen. et sp. nov	Valid	Nyborg, Fraaije & Dunbar	Pliocene (Piacenzian)	San Diego Formation	United States (California)	A hermit crab belonging to the family Calcinidae. Genus includes new species S. calvanoi.	
Somalis	Gen. et sp. nov	Valid	Barros & de Oliveira	Early Cretaceous (Aptian-Albian)	Romualdo Formation	Brazil	A member of Penaeoidea. The type species is S. piauiensis.	
Soomicaris ordosensis	Sp. nov		Liu et al.	Ordovician	Lashizhong Formation	China	A member of Phyllocarida belonging to the group Archaeostraca and the family Caryocarididae.	
Spinirostrimaia echinata	Sp. nov	Valid	Ferratges et al.	Eocene	Pamplona Marls Formation	Spain	A crab belonging to the family Majidae.	
Squamipelta	Gen. et sp. nov	Valid	Yost, Feldmann & Schweitzer	Paleocene	Kambühel Formation	Austria	A hermit crab belonging to the family Annuntidiogenidae. The type species is S. insecta.	
Tanaidaurum	Gen. et sp. nov	Valid	Pazinato, Müller & Haug	Cretaceous	Burmese amber	Myanmar	A member of Tanaidacea. The type species is T. kachinensis.	
Tanidromites maerteni	Sp. nov	Valid	Fraaije et al.	Middle Jurassic (Bajocian)		France	A tanidromitid crab. Announced in 2013; validated in 2023.	
Triassosculda	Gen. et sp. nov	Valid	Smith, Charbonnier, Fara & Brayard in Smith et al.	Early Triassic	Thaynes Group	United States (Idaho)	A mantis shrimp belonging to the group Unipeltata. The type species is T. ahyongi.	
Trichopeltarion ryouheii	Sp. nov	Valid	Kato in Kato et al.	Miocene	Kosho Formation	Japan	A member of the family Trichopeltariidae.	
Urda buechneri	Sp. nov		Schädel, Nagler & Hyžný	Middle Jurassic (Bajocian)		Germany	An isopod belonging to the group Scutocoxifera.	
Urda stemmerbergensis	Comb. nov		(Malzahn)	Early Cretaceous (Hauterivian)		Germany	An isopod belonging to the group Scutocoxifera. Moved from "Palaega" stemmerbergensis Malzahn (1968).	
Urda suevica	Comb. nov		(Reiff)	Early Jurassic (Pliensbachian)	Amaltheenton Formation	Germany	An isopod belonging to the group Scutocoxifera. Moved from "Palaega" suevica Reiff (1936).	
Verrucarcinus marsae	Sp. nov	In press	Van Bakel & Guinot	Middle Jurassic (Callovian)		France	A crab belonging to the family Glaessneropsidae.	
Viapagurus	Gen. et comb. nov		Ferratges & Zamora in García-Penas et al.	Early Cretaceous	Maestrazgo Basin	Spain	A hermit crab. The type species is "Pagurus" avellanedai Vía (1951).	
Vilsercarcinus	Gen. et sp. nov	In press	Van Bakel & Guinot	Jurassic (Toarcian-Callovian)		Austria-Germany border area	A crab belonging to the family Glaessneropsidae. The type species is V. keuppi.	
Xanthosia sakoi	Sp. nov	Valid	Karasawa, Ohara & Kato	Early Cretaceous (Barremian)	Arida Formation	Japan	A member of the family Etyidae. Announced in 2008 in an online-only journal, prior to electronic-only publications being allowed under ICZN; validated in 2023.	

==== Malacostracan research ====
- Chény, Charbonnier & Audo (2023) reexamine the fossil record of lobsters from the Middle Jurassic of Normandy (France), providing evidence of the presence of sexual dimorphism in Glyphea dressieri and proposing the first reconstruction of this lobster.
- Klompmaker et al. (2023) report the discovery of a specimen of Secretanella sp. from a Campanian methane seep in South Dakota (United Kingdom) preserved with parts of its internal anatomy, including the first esophagus preserved in a fossil decapod reported to date.
- New specimen of Eogeryon elegius, providing new information on the anatomy of this crab, is described from the Cenomanian Villa de Vés Formation (Spain) by Ossó (2023).
- Putative hypothalassiid Lathahypossia aculeata is reinterpreted as a xanthid by Ossó & Ng (2023).
- A specimen of Araripenaeus timidus with a swelling on its carapace which might be indicative of infestation by bopyrid isopods is described from the Lower Cretaceous Romualdo Formation (Brazil) by Lima et al. (2023), representing the oldest evidence of parasitism in marine dendrobranchiate shrimps reported to date.
- New solenocerid, glypheid and mecochirid fossil material is reported from the upper Callovian sites of the Ryazan Region (Russia) by Dadykin & Shmakov (2023).
- A study on the extinction and survival of the decapod crustacean groups during the Cretaceous–Paleogene extinction event is published by Schweitzer & Feldmann (2023).

=== Ostracods ===
Name	Novelty	Status	Authors	Age	Type locality	Country	Notes	Images
Acratia xinjiangensis	Sp. nov		Luo et al.	Carboniferous (Pennsylvanian)		China		
Aechmina iwatensis	Sp. nov	Valid	Tanaka	Carboniferous (Pennsylvanian)	Nagaiwa Formation	Japan		
Bairdia dukanensis	Sp. nov	Valid	Hawramy, Al-Obidee & Aziz	Late Cretaceous	Shiranish Formation	Iraq	A member of the family Bairdiidae.	
Bairdoppilata shiranishensis	Sp. nov	Valid	Hawramy, Al-Obidee & Aziz	Late Cretaceous	Shiranish Formation	Iraq	A member of the family Bairdiidae.	
Bungonibeyrichia treslata	Sp. nov	In press	Camilleri, Weldon & Warne	Devonian (Emsian)	Woori Yallock Formation	Australia	A member of Palaeocopida belonging to the group Beyrichicopina and the family Craspedobolbinidae.	
Buntonia whittakerensis	Sp. nov	Valid	Khosla et al.	Late Cretaceous-Paleocene transition	Deccan Intertrappean Beds	India		
Calocaria callundosa	Sp. nov		Perrier et al.	Silurian (Přídolí)		Spain	A myodocope ostracod.	
Cutympanum	Gen. et sp. nov	In press	Williams et al.	Silurian	Si Ka Formation	Vietnam	A glossomorphitine hollinoidean ostracod. Genus includes new species C. hagiangensis.	
Cyprideis calchaquiensis	Sp. nov	Valid	Zamudio & Carignano	Miocene		Argentina	A member of the family Cytherideidae.	
Cyprideis qattaraensis	Sp. nov		Shahin, El Khawagah & Shahin			Egypt		
Cytherella indica	Sp. nov		Kumari	Middle Jurassic	Jaisalmer Formation	India	A species of Cytherella. The name is shared with Cytherella indica Neale & Singh (1986).	
Cytheropteron tesakovae	Sp. nov		Karpuk	Early Cretaceous (Barremian–Aptian)		Crimea	A member of Podocopida belonging to the family Paradoxostomatidae. The specific name is shared with Cytheropteron tesakovae Kempf (2011).	
Damonella medialtis	Sp. nov	Valid	Santos Filho et al.	Early Cretaceous		Brazil		
Healdia ofunatensis	Sp. nov	Valid	Tanaka	Carboniferous (Pennsylvanian)	Nagaiwa Formation	Japan		
Healdia rikutyuensis	Sp. nov	Valid	Tanaka	Carboniferous (Pennsylvanian)	Nagaiwa Formation	Japan		
Healdianella shiqianensis	Sp. nov		Luo et al.	Carboniferous (Pennsylvanian)		China		
Hornibrookella nudosa	Sp. nov	Valid	Hawramy, Al-Obidee & Aziz	Late Cretaceous	Shiranish Formation	Iraq	A member of the family Hemicytheridae.	
Ideluralia	Nom. nov	Valid	Antonietto & Brandão	Devonian		Russia	A member of the family Bairdiidae; a replacement name for Bairdiella Egorova (1960).	
Jordanites michinokuensis	Sp. nov	Valid	Tanaka	Carboniferous (Pennsylvanian)	Nagaiwa Formation	Japan		
Judahella kangpla	Sp. nov		Forel & Chitnarin	Late Triassic (Carnian)	Kang Pla Formation	Thailand		
Limnocythere martensi	Sp. nov	Valid	Khosla et al.	Late Cretaceous-Paleocene transition	Deccan Intertrappean Beds	India	A species of Limnocythere.	
Liuzhinia phetchabunensis	Sp. nov		Forel & Chitnarin	Permian		Thailand		
Looneyellopsis? sagittensis	Sp. nov	Valid	Santos Filho et al.	Early Cretaceous		Brazil		
Microceratina andreui	Sp. nov	Valid	Cabral & Lord in Danielopol et al.	Early and Middle Jurassic (Toarcian and Aalenian)	São Gião Formation	Portugal	A member of the family Cytheruridae.	
Micropneumatocythere joyanensis	Sp. nov	Valid	Kumari	Middle Jurassic	Jaisalmer Formation	India		
Monspopulus	Gen. et sp. nov	In press	Williams et al.	Silurian	Si Ka Formation	Vietnam	A sigmoopsine hollinoidean ostracod. Genus includes new species M. amicus.	
Neomonoceratina farasensis	Sp. nov		Shahin, El Khawagah & Shahin			Egypt		
Pattersoncypris trapezium	Sp. nov	Valid	Santos Filho et al.	Early Cretaceous		Brazil		
Platyrhomboides japonica	Sp. nov	Valid	Tanaka	Carboniferous (Pennsylvanian)	Nagaiwa Formation	Japan		
Platyrhomboides tohokuensis	Sp. nov	Valid	Tanaka	Carboniferous (Pennsylvanian)	Nagaiwa Formation	Japan		
Progonocythere khoslai	Sp. nov	Valid	Kumari	Middle Jurassic	Jaisalmer Formation	India		
Pseudobythocypris asiatica	Sp. nov	Valid	Tanaka	Carboniferous (Pennsylvanian)	Nagaiwa Formation	Japan		
Pseudobythocypris siveteri	Sp. nov	Valid	Tanaka	Carboniferous (Pennsylvanian)	Nagaiwa Formation	Japan		
Pseudobythocypris zipangu	Sp. nov	Valid	Tanaka	Carboniferous (Pennsylvanian)	Nagaiwa Formation	Japan		
Rudolfestatscaphium	Nom. nov		Li	Silurian		Germany	A member of the family Bythocytheridae; a replacement name for Scaphium Jordan (1964). Published online in 2024, but the issue date is listed as December 2023.	
Thuringobolbina ikeyai	Sp. nov	Valid	Tanaka	Carboniferous (Pennsylvanian)	Nagaiwa Formation	Japan		
Trichordis minuta	Sp. nov	Valid	Kumari	Middle Jurassic	Jaisalmer Formation	India		
Zonocypris penchi	Sp. nov	Valid	Khosla et al.	Late Cretaceous-Paleocene transition	Deccan Intertrappean Beds	India		

=== Thecostracans ===
Name	Novelty	Status	Authors	Age	Type locality	Country	Notes	Images
Calvatilepas	Gen. et sp. nov	Valid	Gale & Vidovic	Late Cretaceous (Cenomanian)	Grey Chalk Subgroup (Zig Zag Formation)	United Kingdom	A barnacle belonging to the group Balanomorpha and the family Brachylepadidae. The type species is C. recurvus.	
Crithmumlepas	Gen. et 2 sp. nov	Valid	Gale & Vidovic	Late Cretaceous (Cenomanian to Coniacian)	Grey Chalk Subgroup (Zig Zag Formation)	United Kingdom	A barnacle belonging to the group Balanomorpha and the family Brachylepadidae. The type species is C. hoensis; genus also includes C. aycliffensis.	
Eolepas carniensis	Sp. nov	Valid	Gale et al.	Late Triassic (Carnian)	Grabfeld Formation	Germany	A barnacle belonging to the family Eolepadidae.	
Eoverruca barringtonensis	Sp. nov	Valid	Gale & Vidovic	Late Cretaceous (Cenomanian)	West Melbury Formation	United Kingdom	A barnacle belonging to the group Verrucomorpha and the family Eoverrucidae.	
Pedupycnolepas lamellatus	Sp. nov	Valid	Gale & Vidovic	Late Cretaceous (Cenomanian)	West Melbury Formation	United Kingdom	A barnacle belonging to the group Verrucomorpha and the family Pycnolepadidae.	
Protochelonibia hermani	Sp. nov	Valid	Gale in De Schutter et al.	Oligocene (Rupelian)	Boom Formation	Belgium	A barnacle belonging to the family Chelonibiidae.	
Pycnolepas batchelorum	Sp. nov	Valid	Gale & Vidovic	Early Cretaceous (Aptian)	Bargate Formation	United Kingdom	A barnacle belonging to the group Verrucomorpha and the family Pycnolepadidae.	

=== Other crustaceans ===
==== New taxa ====
Name	Novelty	Status	Authors	Age	Type locality	Country	Notes	Images
Carapacestheria cangshanensis	Sp. nov	In press	Li	Late Jurassic	Penglaizhen Formation	China	A clam shrimp.	
Jurapingquania	Nom. nov	Valid	Ceccolini & Cianferoni	Late Jurassic	Tuchengzi Formation	China	A member of the family Eosestheriidae; a replacement name for Pingquania Wang in Wang & Li (2008). Published online in 2024, but the issue date is listed as December 2023.	
Malayacyclus	Gen. et sp. nov	Valid	Tang et al.	Carboniferous (Viséan)		Malaysia	A member of Cyclida. Genus includes new species M. terengganuensis. Announced in 2021; validated in 2023.	
Triglypta jiyuanensis	Sp. nov	Valid	Liao & Huang in Liao et al.	Late Jurassic	Maao Formation	China	A clam shrimp.	

==== Other crustacean research ====
- Li (2023) redescribed the type material of Anyuanestheria subquadrata and emends its diagnosis.

== Radiodonts ==
=== New radiodont taxa ===
Name	Novelty	Status	Authors	Age	Type locality	Country	Notes	Images
Anomalocaris daleyae	Sp. nov	Valid	Paterson, García-Bellido & Edgecombe	Cambrian Stage 4	Emu Bay Shale	Australia		
Echidnacaris	Gen. et comb. nov	Valid	Paterson, García-Bellido & Edgecombe	Cambrian Stage 4	Emu Bay Shale	Australia	A member of the family Tamisiocarididae. The type species is "Anomalocaris" briggsi Nedin (1995).	
Guanshancaris	Gen. et comb. nov		Zhang et al.	Cambrian Stage 4	Wulongqing Formation	China	An amplectobeluid radiodont. The type species is "Anomalocaris" kunmingensis Wang, Huang & Hu (2013).	
Pseudoangustidontus izdigua	Sp. nov	Valid	Potin, Gueriau & Daley	Ordovician (Tremadocian)	Fezouata Formation	Morocco	A suspension feeding hurdiid radiodont within new subfamily Aegirocassisinae.	

=== Radiodont research ===
- A study on molting patterns and ontogeny in Stanleycaris is published by Moysiuk & Caron (2023), who find evidence for two distinct fossil types of Stanleycaris (carcasses and molted exoskeletal remains), interpret their findings as confirming that radiodonts grew by periodic ecdysis, and consider the general pattern of molting in Stanleycaris to be likely shared with other radiodonts and possibly with other early arthropods.
- A study on the functional capabilities and hydrodynamic performance of the frontal appendages of Anomalocaris canadensis is published by Bicknell et al. (2023), who interpret their findings as indicating that A. canadensis targeted soft-bodied prey.
- A study on the development of the frontal appendage of Amplectobelua symbrachiata is published by Wu et al. (2023), who interpret their findings as indicative of rapid growth.

== Trilobites ==
=== New trilobite taxa ===
Name	Novelty	Status	Authors	Age	Type locality	Country	Notes	Images
Aaraecoryphe	Gen. et sp. et comb. nov	Valid	Basse & Müller	Devonian (Emsian)		Czech Republic; Germany	A member of the family Tropidocoryphidae. The type species is A. hermanni; genus also includes "Wolayella" celox Šnajdr (1980).	
Anderssonella undulata	Sp. nov	Valid	Wernette & Hughes in Wernette et al.	Cambrian (Furongian)	Ao Mo Lae Formation	Thailand	A member of Asaphida belonging to the family Dikelocephalidae.	
Arisemolobes	Gen. et sp. nov	Valid	Ingham & Fortey	Ordovician	Charchaq Group	China	A member of Asaphida belonging to the group Cyclopygoidea and the family Ellipsotaphridae. Genus includes new species A. zhouzhiyii.	
Asaphellus charoenmiti	Sp. nov	Valid	Wernette & Hughes in Wernette et al.	Ordovician (Tremadocian)	Talo Wao Formation	Thailand	A member of the family Asaphidae.	
Asaphellus zheni	Sp. nov	In press	Smith & Allen	Ordovician (Floian)	Nambeet Formation	Australia	A member of the family Asaphidae.	
Aulacopleurella euoplos	Sp. nov	Valid	Flick	Devonian		Germany		
Aulacopleurella platurris	Sp. nov	Valid	Flick	Devonian		Germany		
Bainella (Belenops) sulmatogrossensis	Sp. nov		Kerber et al.	Devonian		Brazil		
Branikarges	Nom. nov	Valid	Basse & Müller	Devonian		Czech Republic	A member of the family Lichidae; a replacement name for Lobopyge Přibyl & Erben (1952). The type species is "Lichas" branikensis Barrande (1872).	
Buttsia trema	Sp. nov	Valid	Westrop & Eoff	Cambrian (Jiangshanian)	Shallow Bay Formation	Canada (Newfoundland and Labrador)		
Carnicaspis	Gen. et comb. nov	Valid	Basse & Müller	Silurian		Austria	A member of the family Odontopleuridae. The type species is "Radiaspis" pecten Santel (2001).	
Catinouyia heyunensis	Sp. nov	Valid	Sun et al.	Cambrian Stage 4	Burgasutay Formation	Mongolia		
Caznaia imsamuti	Sp. nov	Valid	Wernette & Hughes in Wernette et al.	Cambrian (Furongian)	Ao Mo Lae Formation	Thailand	A member of Asaphida belonging to the family Dikelocephalidae.	
Ceratocephala greifensteinensis	Sp. nov	Valid	Basse & Müller	Devonian	Greifenstein Limestone	Germany	A member of the family Odontopleuridae.	
Ceratocephala hoerriana	Sp. nov	Valid	Basse & Müller	Devonian	Greifenstein Limestone	Germany	A member of the family Odontopleuridae.	
Ceratocephala martinii	Sp. nov	Valid	Basse & Müller	Devonian (Emsian)	Leun Shale	Germany	A member of the family Odontopleuridae.	
Ceratocephalina angustifurcata	Sp. nov	Valid	Feist & Clarkson	Silurian		France	A member of the family Odontopleuridae.	
Chotecops ahlburgi	Sp. nov	Valid	Basse & Müller	Devonian (Emsian)	Leun Limestone	Germany	A member of the family Phacopidae.	
Chotecops braunfelsensis	Sp. nov	Valid	Basse & Müller	Devonian (Emsian)	Leun Limestone	Germany	A member of the family Phacopidae.	
Circulocrania ? dichaulax	Sp. nov	Valid	Ingham & Fortey	Ordovician	Myoch Formation	United Kingdom		
Corbinia perforata	Sp. nov	Valid	Wernette & Hughes in Wernette et al.	Ordovician (Tremadocian)	Talo Wao Formation	Thailand	A member of the family Eurekiidae.	
Crassibole kore	Sp. nov	Valid	Müller & Hahn	Carboniferous (Viséan)	Hillershausen Formation	Germany		
Cyphaspis? moei	Sp. nov	Valid	Flick & Flick	Devonian (Eifelian)		Germany	A member of Proetida belonging to the family Aulacopleuridae and the subfamily Otarioninae.	
Devononeseuretus	Gen. et sp. nov	Valid	Alberti	Devonian		Germany	A member of Phacopida belonging to the family Calymenidae and the subfamily Reedocalymeninae. The type species is D. beichti.	
Diademaproetus? elevator	Sp. nov	Valid	Basse & Müller	Devonian (Emsian)	Leun Limestone	Germany	A member of the family Proetidae.	
Diademaproetus frankschmidti	Sp. nov	Valid	Basse & Müller	Devonian (Emsian)	Leun Shale	Germany	A member of the family Proetidae.	
Diademaproetus holzapfeli ahrensi	Ssp. nov	Valid	Basse & Müller	Devonian (Emsian)	Leun Limestone	Germany	A member of the family Proetidae.	
Dianops kaufmannii	Sp. nov	Valid	Basse & Lemke	Devonian (Famennian)	Wocklum Limestone	Germany		
Eoleonaspis maeander	Sp. nov	Valid	Feist & Clarkson	Silurian (Homerian)		France	A member of the family Odontopleuridae.	
Funeralaspis	Gen. et sp. nov	Valid	Adrain & Pérez-Peris	Ordovician (Dapingian)	Antelope Valley Limestone	United States (California)	An odontopleurine trilobite. The type species is F. deathvalleyensis.	
Ignoproetus bohatyi	Sp. nov	Valid	Basse & Müller	Devonian (Emsian)	Leun Limestone	Germany	A member of the family Proetidae.	
Jiia talowaois	Sp. nov	Valid	Wernette & Hughes in Wernette et al.	Ordovician (Tremadocian)	Talo Wao Formation	Thailand	A member of Asaphida belonging to the family Remopleurididae.	
Karslanus leishuae	Sp. nov		Peng et al.	Cambrian (Guzhangian)	Longha Formation	China		
Kettneraspis acanthifrons	Sp. nov	Valid	Feist & Clarkson	Silurian (Homerian)		France	A member of the family Odontopleuridae.	
Kettneraspis anteflexa	Sp. nov	Valid	Feist & Clarkson	Silurian (Homerian)		France	A member of the family Odontopleuridae.	
Kettneraspis loehnbergensis	Sp. nov	Valid	Basse & Müller	Devonian (Emsian)	Leun Shale	Germany	A member of the family Odontopleuridae.	
Kettneraspis rojanensis	Sp. nov	Valid	Feist & Clarkson	Silurian (Homerian)		France	A member of the family Odontopleuridae.	
Koneprusia morrisoni	Sp. nov	Valid	Basse & Müller	Devonian (Emsian)	Leun Shale	Germany	A member of the family Odontopleuridae.	
Koneprusites aarae	Sp. nov	Valid	Basse & Müller	Devonian (Eifelian)	Günterod Limestone	Germany	A member of the family Proetidae.	
Koneprusites lahnae	Sp. nov	Valid	Basse & Müller	Devonian (Emsian)	Leun Limestone	Germany	A member of the family Proetidae.	
Laethoprusia augur	Sp. nov	Valid	Feist & Clarkson	Silurian (Homerian)		France	A member of the family Odontopleuridae.	
Lahnops postmahrheckam	Sp. nov	Valid	Basse & Müller	Devonian (Emsian)	Leun Shale	Germany	A member of the family Phacopidae.	
Leishuia	Gen. et sp. nov	In press	Peng et al.	Cambrian (Guzhangian)	Longha Formation	China	A dameselloid trilobite. Genus includes new species L. leishuae.	
Leonaspis jdongesi	Sp. nov	Valid	Basse & Müller	Devonian (Emsian)	Leun Shale	Germany	A member of the family Odontopleuridae.	
Lophosaukia nuchanongi	Sp. nov	Valid	Wernette & Hughes in Wernette et al.	Cambrian (Furongian)	Ao Mo Lae Formation	Thailand	A member of Asaphida belonging to the family Dikelocephalidae.	
Lorrettina waterhousei	Sp. nov		Smith	Cambrian (Jiangshanian)	Goyder Formation	Australia	A dokimocephalid trilobite.	
Macroblepharum leunense	Sp. nov	Valid	Basse & Müller	Devonian (Emsian)	Leun Limestone	Germany	A member of the family Proetidae.	
Madiganaspis lauriei	Sp. nov	In press	Smith & Allen	Ordovician (Floian)	Nambeet Formation	Australia	A member of the family Asaphidae.	
Mitroplax	Gen. et comb. nov	Valid	Holloway	Devonian (Pragian to Emsian)	Norton Gully Sandstone	Australia	A scutelluid trilobite. The type species is "Bronteus" enormis Etheridge (1894).	
Monocheilus reginae	Sp. nov	Valid	Blackwell & Westrop	Cambrian (Jiangshanian)	Honey Creek Formation	United States (Oklahoma)	A member of the family Eurekiidae.	
Monocheilus richardi	Sp. nov	Valid	Blackwell & Westrop	Cambrian (Jiangshanian)	Honey Creek Formation	United States (Oklahoma)	A member of the family Eurekiidae.	
Nagaproetus thaumas	Sp. nov	Valid	Flick	Devonian		Germany		
Norasaphus (Norasaphus) jagoi	Sp. nov	In press	Smith & Allen	Ordovician (Floian)	Nambeet Formation	Australia	A member of the family Asaphidae.	
Olenoides proa	Comb. nov		(Rusconi)	Cambrian (Guzhangian)		Argentina	Moved from Cancapolia proa Rusconi (1954).	
Omegops honggulelengensis	Sp. nov	Junior synonym	Zong	Devonian (Famennian)		China	A phacopid trilobite. Subsequently considered to be a junior synonym of Omegops mobilis (Xiang, 1981) by Zong (2023).	
Omegops xiangi	Sp. nov	Junior synonym	Zong	Devonian (Famennian)		China	A phacopid trilobite. Subsequently considered to be a junior synonym of Clarksonops junggariensis Crônier in Crônier and Waters (2022) by Zong (2023), resulting in a new combination Omegops junggariensis.	
Orbitoproetus ager	Sp. nov	Valid	Basse & Müller	Devonian (Emsian)	Leun Limestone	Germany	A member of the family Proetidae.	
Oryctocephalus doliiformis	Sp. nov	Valid	Korovnikov	Cambrian	Kuonamka Formation	Russia (Sakha)		
Oryctocephalus molodoensis	Sp. nov	Valid	Korovnikov	Cambrian	Kuonam formation	Russia (Sakha)		
Otarion hetairos	Sp. nov	Valid	Flick & Flick	Devonian (Eifelian)		Germany	A member of Proetida belonging to the family Aulacopleuridae and the subfamily Otarioninae.	
Pagodia? uhleini	Sp. nov	Valid	Wernette & Hughes in Wernette et al.	Cambrian (Furongian)	Ao Mo Lae Formation	Thailand	A member of Corynexochida belonging to the group Leiostegiina and the family Leiostegiidae.	
Perunaspis mathesii	Sp. nov	Valid	Basse & Müller	Devonian (Emsian)	Leun Limestone	Germany	A member of the family Lichidae.	
Phaetonellus aloisi phorkys	Ssp. nov	Valid	Flick	Devonian		Germany		
Phaetonellus naspae	Sp. nov	Valid	Basse & Müller	Devonian (Emsian)	Leun Limestone	Germany	A member of the family Tropidocoryphidae.	
Phaetonellus planicauda spechti	Ssp. nov	Valid	Flick	Devonian		Germany		
Phaetonellus pymon guenterodicus	Ssp. nov	Valid	Flick	Devonian		Germany		
Phaetonellus vaneki gryps	Ssp. nov	Valid	Flick	Devonian		Germany		
Plesiowensus erraticus	Sp. nov	Valid	Basse & Schöning	Silurian		Germany	A member of the family Proetidae.	
Pseudokoldinioidia maneekuti	Sp. nov	Valid	Wernette & Hughes in Wernette et al.	Cambrian (Furongian)	Ao Mo Lae Formation	Thailand	A member of Corynexochida belonging to the group Leiostegiina and the family Missisquoiidae.	
Ptychaspis matuszaki	Sp. nov	Valid	Blackwell & Westrop	Cambrian (Jiangshanian)	Fort Sill Formation	United States (Oklahoma)	A member of the family Ptychaspididae.	
Ptychaspis occulta	Sp. nov	Valid	Blackwell & Westrop	Cambrian	Wilberns Formation	United States (Texas)	A member of the family Ptychaspididae.	
Pulcherproetus brandenborchnova	Sp. nov	Valid	Basse & Schöning	Silurian		Germany	A member of the family Proetidae.	
Pulcherproetus inexspectatus	Sp. nov	Valid	Basse & Schöning	Silurian		Germany	A member of the family Proetidae.	
Pulcherproetus laerheidensis	Sp. nov	Valid	Basse & Schöning	Silurian		Germany	A member of the family Proetidae.	
Pulcherproetus maennilae	Sp. nov	Valid	Basse & Schöning	Silurian		Estonia	A member of the family Proetidae.	
Pulcherproetus schranki	Sp. nov	Valid	Basse & Schöning	Silurian		Germany	A member of the family Proetidae.	
Pulcherproetus sutherbergensis	Sp. nov	Valid	Basse & Schöning	Silurian		Germany	A member of the family Proetidae.	
Pulcherproetus trachyglossus	Sp. nov	Valid	Basse & Schöning	Silurian		Germany	A member of the family Proetidae.	
Rabienops borkewehrensis	Sp. nov		Basse & Lemke	Devonian (Famennian)	Wocklum Limestone	Germany	A member of the family Phacopidae. Basse & Lemke (2023) did not exclude the possibility of the synonymy with R. evae.	
Rabienops dxv	Sp. nov		Basse & Lemke	Devonian (Famennian)	Wocklum Limestone	Germany	A member of the family Phacopidae. Basse & Lemke (2023) did not exclude the possibility of the synonymy with R. evae.	
Radiaspis guenterodensis	Sp. nov	Valid	Basse & Müller	Devonian		Germany	A member of the family Odontopleuridae.	
Radiaspis knoppi	Sp. nov	Valid	Basse & Müller	Devonian	Greifenstein Limestone	Germany	A member of the family Odontopleuridae.	
Remopleurides zhangi	Sp. nov		Wei et al.	Ordovician (Katian)	Koumenzi Formation	China		
Rheicarges	Gen. et comb. et sp. nov	Valid	Basse & Müller	Devonian		Germany	A member of the family Lichidae. The type species is "Lichas" decheni Holzapfel (1895); genus also includes "Lobopyge" niobe Basse (1998) and a new species R. schneideri.	
Rodingaia leggi	Sp. nov	In press	Smith & Allen	Ordovician (Floian)	Nambeet Formation	Australia	A member of the family Asaphidae.	
Sanbernardaspis excalibur	Sp. nov	In press	Smith & Allen	Ordovician (Tremadocian)	Nambeet Formation	Australia	A member of the family Asaphidae.	
Signatoproetus	Gen. et sp. nov	Valid	Basse & Schöning	Silurian		Germany	A member of the family Proetidae. Genus includes new species S. wiedae.	
Spinicryphops wocklumeriae	Comb. nov	Valid	(Richter & Richter)	Devonian (Famennian)	Wocklum Limestone	Germany	A member of the family Phacopidae. Moved from Phacops (Cryphops?) wocklumeriae Richter & Richter (1926).	
Struveaspis haigeriana	Sp. nov	Valid	Basse & Müller	Devonian	Wissenbach Shale	Germany	A member of the family Phacopidae.	
Struveaspis liuunensis	Sp. nov	Valid	Basse & Müller	Devonian (Emsian)	Leun Limestone	Germany	A member of the family Phacopidae.	
Synaptotaphrus	Gen. et sp. nov	Valid	Ingham & Fortey	Ordovician	Myoch Formation	United Kingdom	A member of Asaphida belonging to the group Cyclopygoidea and the family Ellipsotaphridae. Genus includes new species S. oarion.	
Tarutaoia	Gen. et sp. nov	Valid	Wernette & Hughes in Wernette et al.	Ordovician (Tremadocian)	Talo Wao Formation	Thailand	A member of Asaphida belonging to the family Remopleurididae. The type species is T. techawani.	
Thysanopeltis jhabenichti	Sp. nov	Valid	Basse & Müller	Devonian (Emsian)	Leun Limestone	Germany	A member of the family Scutelluidae.	
Triorygma	Gen. et sp. nov	Valid	Westrop & Eoff	Cambrian (Jiangshanian)	Shallow Bay Formation	Canada (Newfoundland and Labrador)	Genus includes new species T. burkhalteri.	
Tropidocoryphe hesseniana	Sp. nov	Valid	Basse & Müller	Devonian (Emsian)	Leun Limestone	Germany	A member of the family Tropidocoryphidae.	
Tsinania sirindhornae	Sp. nov	Valid	Wernette & Hughes in Wernette et al.	Cambrian (Furongian)	Ao Mo Lae Formation	Thailand	A member of Corynexochida belonging to the group Illaenina and the family Tsinaniidae.	
Vandergrachtia vandergrachtii carsteni	Ssp. nov	Valid	Müller & Hahn	Carboniferous (Viséan)	Hillershausen Formation	Germany		
Veeversaspis	Gen. et sp. nov	In press	Smith & Allen	Ordovician (Tremadocian)	Nambeet Formation	Australia	A member of the family Bathyuridae. The type species is V. jelli.	
Zhiyia	Gen. et comb. nov	Valid	Wei & Zhou	Ordovician (Floian)	Duoquanshan Formation	China	A member of the family Asaphidae belonging to the subfamily Isotelinae. The type species is "Isotelus" tsinghaiensis Chang & Fan (1960); genus also includes "Niobe (Niobella)" obscura Zhou & Zhou (2019).	

=== Trilobite research ===
- Evidence indicating that a mechanism similar to the molecular activator/inhibitor mechanism present in vertebrates and known as the inhibitory cascade had controls on segment size development in trilobites is presented by Nikolic, Hopkins & Evans (2023).
- A study on the timing of the appearance of trilobite planktic larvae is published Laibl, Saleh & Pérez-Peris (2023), who interpret their findings as indicating that Cambrian ecosystems were dominated by trilobites with exclusively benthic early post-embryonic stages, and that a progressive increase in the number of trilobite taxa that incorporated planktic stages in their development happened between the Miaolingian and the Middle Ordovician.
- A study on the disparity of trilobite cephalic structures across Cambrian Series 2, providing evidence that the development of disparity of various cephalic structures was constrained in different ways, is published by Holmes (2023).
- A study on the morphology and evolutionary relationships of Duyunaspis duyunensis, D. jianheensis and Balangia balangensis from the Cambrian Balang and Tsinghsutung formations (China) is published by Chen et al. (2023), who report evidence of gradual evolution indicative that Balangia was more likely to be an ancestor of Duyunaspis rather than its descendant.
- Taxonomic revision of the species belonging to the genus Abadiella is published by Wang, Peng & Zhang (2023), who consider Parabadiella, Guangyuanaspis and Parabadiella (Danangouia) to be junior junior synonyms of Abadiella, and consider the species A. huoi and A. bourgini to have wide geographic distribution in Gondwana, making stratigraphical correlations between various Gondwana regions based on Cambrian trilobites possible.
- A study on the morphology, ontogeny and systematics of Walcottaspis vanhornei is published by Srivastava & Hughes (2023).
- Hou, Hughes & Hopkins (2023) report the presence of setae on the walking legs of the Cambrian Olenoides serratus and on the gill shaft of the Ordovician Triarthrus eatoni, and interpret these setae as likely used to groom the gills of the trilobites.
- Evidence of the presence of countercurrent gaseous exchange mechanism in the gills of Triarthrus eatoni is presented by Hou et al. (2023).
- A study on the taphonomy of the Ordovician trilobites from the Walcott–Rust quarry (New York, United States) is published by Losso, Thines & Ortega-Hernández (2023), who report evidence indicating that fine-grained sediment supported the preservation of delicate appendages and facilitated their fossilization.
- A study on the morphology of the ventral part of the exoskeletons of trilobites from the Walcott–Rust quarry, providing evidence of adaptations facilitating complete enrolment convergent with those present in extant arthropods, is published by Losso et al. (2023).
- Laibl et al. (2023) describe early developmental stages of at least nine trilobite species from the Fezouata Formation (Morocco), providing new information on the development of early Ordovician trilobites.
- Schoenemann & Clarkson (2023) describe specimens of Aulacopleura koninckii and Cyclopyge sibilla preserved with structures interpreted as likely median eyes, and interpret this finding as indicating that early developmental stages of trilobites possessed median eyes (probably unlike adult specimens).
- A study on the impact of changes of body shape and construction of Aulacopleura koninckii during its growth on changes of the style of its enrolment is published by Esteve & Hughes (2023), who find that the change in enrolment style happening at the onset of mature growth made it possible for A. koninckii to assume defensive posture regardless of the variation in the number of mature trunk segments of specimens belonging to the studied species.
- A study on the hydrodynamics of Microparia speciosa, indicating that it had a high stability in the water column when it was enrolled, is published by Esteve & López-Pachón (2023).
- Kraft et al. (2023) describe a specimen of Bohemolichas incola from the Darriwilian Šárka Formation (Czech Republic) preserved with fossilized gut contents, providing evidence of adaptation of the studied trilobite to feeding on organic remains including shells, and probably of digestive enzymes similar to those in modern crustaceans or chelicerates.
- Gishlick & Fortey (2023) describe a specimen of Walliserops trifurcatus with a malformed cephalic trident showing four rather than three tines, and consider its anatomy to be consistent with the interpretation of the trident as a weapon used for intraspecific combat.
- Fossil evidence confirming the survival of encrinurid trilobites into the earliest Devonian is reported from the Wutubulake and Mangeer formations (China) by Ma et al. (2023).
- A study on the impact of the Late Devonian extinctions on the taxonomic and morphological diversity of trilobites, and on the trilobite recovery after the extinction events, is published by Bault (2023).
- A study on the locomotion of trilobites, based on data from three-dimensional models, is published by Esteve & Rubio (2023), who find evidence for two main gait types reflecting burrowing and walking, as well as evidence indicating that the body structure constrained speed and lifestyles of trilobites.
- A study on changes of the morphological diversity of phacopid trilobites throughout their evolutionary history is published by Bault et al. (2023).
- Park (2023) examined trilobite specimens and shown that hypostome is fusion of anterior sclerite and labrum.

== Other arthropods ==
=== New taxa ===
Name	Novelty	Status	Authors	Age	Type locality	Country	Notes	Images
Austriocaris secretanae	Sp. nov	Valid	Laville, Forel & Charbonnier	Middle Jurassic (Callovian)	La Voulte-sur-Rhône Lagerstätte	France	A thylacocephalan.	
Carimersa	Gen. et sp. nov		Briggs et al.	Silurian (Wenlock)	Herefordshire Lagerstätte	United Kingdom	A member of Artiopoda belonging to the group Vicissicaudata. The type species is C. neptuni.	
Cotalagnostus greilingi	Sp. nov	Valid	Weidner, Nielsen & Ebbestad	Cambrian (Miaolingian)	Alum Shale Formation	Sweden	A member of Agnostoidea belonging to the family Spinagnostidae.	
Cretojapyx	Gen. et sp. nov	Valid	Wang, Huang & Cai	Cretaceous (Albian to Cenomanian)	Burmese amber	Myanmar	A member of Diplura belonging to the family Japygidae. The type species is C. huangi.	
Electroprojapyx	Gen. et sp. nov	Valid	Sánchez-García et al.	Late Cretaceous (Cenomanian)	Burmese amber	Myanmar	A member of Diplura belonging to the family Projapygidae. The type species is E. alchemicus.	
Lauravolsella	Gen. et sp. nov	Valid	Haug, Fraaije & Haug	Carboniferous (Westphalian)		Netherlands	A millipede, possibly belonging to the group Archipolypoda. The type species is L. willemeni.	
Lepidocampa glaesi	Sp. nov	Valid	Sánchez-García, Sendra & Grimaldi in Sánchez-García et al.	Miocene	Dominican amber	Dominican Republic	A member of Diplura belonging to the family Campodeidae.	
Lithopendra	Gen. et sp. nov	Valid	Haug, Haug & Haug	Cretaceous	Burmese amber	Myanmar	A centipede belonging to the group Pleurostigmophora. The type species is L. anjafliessae.	
Litocampa eobaltica	Sp. nov	Valid	Sánchez-García, Sendra & Grimaldi in Sánchez-García et al.	Eocene	Baltic amber	Europe (Baltic Sea region)	A member of Diplura belonging to the family Campodeidae, a species of Litocampa.	
Maldybulakia saierensis	Sp. nov	Valid	Zong et al.	Silurian (Pridoli)		China		
Paraclausocaris	Gen. et sp. nov	Valid	Laville, Forel & Charbonnier	Middle Jurassic (Callovian)	La Voulte-sur-Rhône Lagerstätte	France	A thylacocephalan. The type species is P. harpa.	
Propolydesmus cretaceus	Sp. nov	Valid	Su, Cai & Huang	Cretaceous (Albian to Cenomanian)	Burmese amber	Myanmar	A millipede belonging to the family Polydesmidae.	
Rostricampa	Gen. et sp. nov	Valid	Sánchez-García, Sendra & Grimaldi in Sánchez-García et al.	Miocene	Dominican amber	Dominican Republic	A member of Diplura belonging to the family Campodeidae. The type species is R. engeli.	
Sidneyia malongensis	Sp. nov	Valid	Zhu et al.	Cambrian Stage 3	Yu'anshan Formation	China		
Sidneyia minor	Sp. nov	Valid	Du et al.	Cambrian Stage 3		China		
Symphylurinopsis	Gen. et sp. nov	Valid	Sánchez-García et al.	Miocene	Dominican amber	Dominican Republic	A member of Diplura belonging to the family Projapygidae. The type species is S. punctatus.	
Theatops groehni	Sp. nov	Valid	Edgecombe et al.	Eocene	Baltic amber	Europe (Baltic Sea region)	A centipede belonging to the family Plutoniumidae.	
Thulaspis	Gen. et sp. nov	Valid	Berks et al.	Cambrian Stage 3	Buen Formation	Greenland	A member of Artiopoda. The type species is T. tholops.	
Tonglaiia	Gen. et sp. nov	Valid	Zhu et al.	Cambrian Stage 3	Yu'anshan Formation	China	A member of Artiopoda of uncertain affinities. The type species is T. bispinosa.	
Zhugeia	Gen. et sp. nov	Valid	Zhu et al.	Cambrian Stage 3	Yu'anshan Formation	China	A member of Artiopoda belonging to the group Xandarellida. The type species is Z. acuticaudata.	

=== Research ===
- New information on the anatomy of Kylinxia zhangi, indicating that its head was composed of six segments (as in extant mandibulates), is presented by O'Flynn et al. (2023), who interpret their findings as indicating that a six-segmented head was already present in the last common ancestor of Kylinxia and the euarthropod crown group.
- Redescription of Isoxys curvirostratus, incorporating data from new fossil material from the Cambrian Chiungchussu Formation (China) and focusing on the biramous appendages of this arthropod, is published by Zhang et al. (2023), who report that the appendage differentiation in Isoxys was higher than previously considered, that the trunk of I. curvirostratus was not arthrodized, and that Isoxys was one of the earliest branching members of Deuteropoda.
- A study on the ontogeny of Isoxys minor, based on data from specimens from the Cambrian Shuijingtuo formation (China), is published by Ma et al. (2023), who interpret the studied fossil material as indicative of only slight morphological differences between the specimens of I. minor which might have been caused by different environment, indicative of the presence of brood care in I. minor, and well as indicative of reproductive ability at the early life stages of this arthropod.
- Pates & Zamora (2023) report the discovery of arthropod carapaces representing at least two taxa (including a tuzoiid) from the Cambrian (Drumian) Murero Formation (Spain), and interpret this finding as possibly indicating that Cambrian bivalved euarthropods living at higher latitudes were larger than those from low latitudes.
- New fossil material of Acanthomeridion serratum, providing new information on the anatomy of members of this species, is described by Du et al. (2023), who interpret A. anacanthus as a junior synonym of A. serratum, and interpret dorsal cephalic sutures of trilobites as more likely to have multiple origins within Artiopoda rather than a single, deep origin.
- Drage, Legg & Daley (2023) describe exuviae from a marrellid marrellomorph from the Ordovician Fezouata Formation (Morocco), providing evidence of moulting behaviour distinct from that described for Marrella splendens.
- A study on the morphology of early developmental stages of marrellids from the Fezouata Formation is published by Laibl et al. (2023), who report that adults and immature individuals shares the same general appendage differentiation, and avoided direct competition for food resources only by feeding on particles of different size.
- New information on the anatomy of Concavicaris woodfordi, including the structure of the shield, the circulatory, digestive and reproductive systems, and the appendages, is presented by Laville et al. (2023).
- Wellman et al. (2023) present data supporting a Silurian (late Wenlock) age of the "Lower Old Red Sandstone" deposits of the Midland Valley (Scotland, United Kingdom) preserving the fossil material of Pneumodesmus newmani, supporting the interpretation of this myriapod as the oldest known air-breathing land animal.
- New information on the morphology of the Carboniferous millipedes Amynilyspes fatimae and Blanziulus parriati from the Montceau-les-Mines Lagerstätte (France) is presented by Lheritier et al. (2023).

== General research ==
- New, diverse fossil material of radiodonts (including indeterminate hurdiids) and euarthropods (including Thelxiope cf. T. palaeothalassia, Perspicaris? dilatus, Branchiocaris pretiosa, Tuzoia retifera, T. guntheri, Dioxycaris argenta, bradoriids and a possible indeterminate species of Naraoia) is described from the Cambrian (Wuliuan) Spence Shale (Idaho and Utah, United States) by Kimmig et al. (2023).
- Naimark, Sizov & Khubanov (2023) report the discovery of a new assemblage of Cambrian arthropods from the Kimiltei site (Irkutsk Oblast, Russia), including the first records of members of Euthycarcinoidea and Synziphosurina from the Siberian platform and the first Cambrian record of Chasmataspidida from this platform.
- Braddy (2023) describes a resting trace of a phyllocarid crustacean from the Miaolingian Hickory Sandstone Member of the Riley Formation (Texas, United States), names a new ichnotaxon Minterichnus shieldi, and reinterprets the arthropod body fossil associated with the resting trace as a phyllocarid rather than the oldest known chasmataspidid.
