= Peltarion (disambiguation) =

Peltarion is a software development company.

Peltarion may also refer to:

- Peltarion (shield), a round or crescent shield used by the Peltasts in ancient warfare
- Peltarion (crab), a genus of crabs in the family Atelecyclidae or Trichopeltariidae
