= Sejidae =

Sejidae Temporal range: Cenomanian–Present

Scientific classification
- Kingdom: Animalia
- Phylum: Arthropoda
- Subphylum: Chelicerata
- Class: Arachnida
- Order: Mesostigmata
- Family: Sejidae; Berlese, 1885

Family of mites

Sejidae is a family of mites in the order Mesostigmata. The oldest known record of the group is an indeterminate deutonymph from the mid Cretaceous (Albian-Cenomanian) aged Burmese amber of Myanmar.

== Species ==
Archaeopodella Athias-Henriot, 1977

- Archaeopodella scopulifera Athias-Henriot, 1977

Asternolaelaps Berlese, 1923

- Asternolaelaps australis Womersley & Domrow, 1959
- Asternolaelaps castrii Athias-Henriot, 1972
- Asternolaelaps fecundus Berlese, 1923
- Asternolaelaps nyhleni (Sellnick, 1953)
- Asternolaelaps putriligneus Kaczmarek, 1984
- Asternolaelaps querci Wisniewski & Hirschmann, 1984

Epicroseius Berlese, 1904

- Epicroseius angellioides Berlese, 1904

Ichthyostomatogaster Sellnick, 1953

- Ichthyostomatogaster nyhleni Sellnick, 1953

Iphidinychus Berlese, 1913

- Iphidinychus balazyi Hirschmann & Wisniewski, in Hirschmann, Wisniewski & Hiramatsu 1992
- Iphidinychus kakumeiensis Hiramatsu & Hirschmann, in Hirschmann, Wisniewski & Hiramatsu 1992
- Iphidinychus manicatus (Berlese, 1913)

Sejus C.L.Koch, 1836

- Sejus acanthurus Canestrini, 1884
- Sejus armatus (Fox, 1947)
- Sejus australis Hirschmann & Kaczmarek, in Hirschmann, Wisniewski & Kaczmarek 1991
- Sejus bakeriarmatus Hirschmann, in Hirschmann, Wisniewski & Kaczmarek 1991
- Sejus boliviensis Hirschmann & Kaczmarek, in Hirschmann, Wisniewski & Kaczmarek 1991
- Sejus bugrovskii Wisniewski & Hirschmann, in Hirschmann, Wisniewski & Kaczmarek 1991
- Sejus camerunis Wisniewski & Hirschmann, in Hirschmann, Wisniewski & Kaczmarek 1991
- Sejus congoensis Wisniewski & Hirschmann, in Hirschmann, Wisniewski & Kaczmarek 1991
- Sejus cubanus Wisniewski & Hirschmann, in Hirschmann, Wisniewski & Kaczmarek 1991
- Sejus geometricus Hirschmann & Kaczmarek, in Hirschmann, Wisniewski & Kaczmarek 1991
- Sejus hinangensis Hirschmann & Kaczmarek, in Hirschmann, Wisniewski & Kaczmarek 1991
- Sejus indicus Bhattacharyya, 1978
- Sejus italicus Berlese, 1916
- Sejus javensis Hirschmann & Kaczmarek, in Hirschmann, Wisniewski & Kaczmarek 1991
- Sejus klakahensis Hirschmann, in Hirschmann, Wisniewski & Kaczmarek 1991
- Sejus krantzi Hirschmann, in Hirschmann, Wisniewski & Kaczmarek 1991
- Sejus manualkranzi Hirschmann, in Hirschmann, Wisniewski & Kaczmarek 1991
- Sejus marquesanus Hirschmann, in Hirschmann, Wisniewski & Kaczmarek 1991
- Sejus mesoafricanus Wisniewski & Hirschmann, in Hirschmann, Wisniewski & Kaczmarek 1991
- Sejus novaezealandiae Fain & Galloway, 1993
- Sejus oblitus Hirschmann, in Hirschmann, Wisniewski & Kaczmarek 1991
- Sejus polonicus Hirschmann & Kaczmarek, in Hirschmann, Wisniewski & Kaczmarek 1991
- Sejus porosus (Domrow, 1957)
- Sejus posnaniensis Hirschmann & Kaczmarek, in Hirschmann, Wisniewski & Kaczmarek 1991
- Sejus rafalskii Wisniewski & Hirschmann, in Hirschmann, Wisniewski & Kaczmarek 1991
- Sejus savannakhetianus Hirschmann & Kaczmarek, in Hirschmann, Wisniewski & Kaczmarek 1991
- Sejus sejiformis
- Sejus solaris Wisniewski & Hirschmann, in Hirschmann, Wisniewski & Kaczmarek 1991
- Sejus stebaevi Wisniewski & Hirschmann, in Hirschmann, Wisniewski & Kaczmarek 1991
- Sejus tanganicus Hirschmann & Kaczmarek, in Hirschmann, Wisniewski & Kaczmarek 1991
- Sejus venezuelanus Hirschmann & Wisniewski, 1994
- Sejus viduus C.L.Koch, 1839
- Sejus vitzthumiangelioides Hirschmann, in Hirschmann, Wisniewski & Kaczmarek 1991
- Sejus vitzthumiseurati Hirschmann, Wisniewski & Kaczmarek, 1991

Uropodella Berlese, 1888

- Uropodella camini Hirschmann & Zirngiebl-Nicol, 1984
- Uropodella congoensis Wisniewski & Hirschmann, 1991
- Uropodella krantzi Hirschmann & Zirngiebl-Nicol, 1984
- Uropodella laciniata Berlese, 1888

Willmannia Balogh, 1938

- Willmannia sejiformis Balogh, 1938

Zuluacarus Trägårdh, 1906

- Zuluacarus termitophilus Trägårdh, 1906
