= Ichthyostomatogasteridae =

Scientific classification
- Kingdom: Animalia
- Phylum: Arthropoda
- Subphylum: Chelicerata
- Class: Arachnida
- Order: Mesostigmata
- Family: Ichthyostomatogasteridae

Family of mites

Ichthyostomatogasteridae is a family of mites belonging to the order Mesostigmata.

Genera:

- Asternolaelaps Berlese, 1923
- Japanasternolaelaps Hirschmann & Hiramatsu, 1984
- Archaeopodella Athias-Henriot, 1977
