= Willmannia =

Scientific classification
- Domain: Eukaryota
- Kingdom: Animalia
- Phylum: Arthropoda
- Subphylum: Chelicerata
- Class: Arachnida
- Order: Mesostigmata
- Family: Sejidae
- Genus: Willmannia; Balogh, 1938

Genus of mites

Willmannia is a genus of mites in the family Sejidae.
