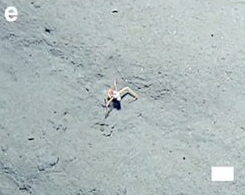
- Probeebei mirabilis

Scientific classification
- Kingdom: Animalia
- Phylum: Arthropoda
- Class: Malacostraca
- Order: Decapoda
- Suborder: Pleocyemata
- Infraorder: Anomura
- Family: Probeebeidae
- Genus: Probeebei; Boone, 1926
- Species: P. mirabilis

Binomial name
- Probeebei mirabilis Boone, 1926

Synonyms
- Planopagurus Wolff, 1960

= Probeebei =

Genus of crustaceans

Probeebei is a monotypic genus of probeebeid hermit crabs, and the family's type genus. Its type and only species is Probeebei mirabilis.
