= Epicroseius =

Scientific classification
- Kingdom: Animalia
- Phylum: Arthropoda
- Subphylum: Chelicerata
- Class: Arachnida
- Order: Mesostigmata
- Family: Sejidae
- Genus: Epicroselus; Berlese, 1904

Genus of mites

Epicroseius is a genus of mites in the family Sejidae.
