= Mutotylaspis =

Mutotylaspis Temporal range: Lower Cretaceous (Albian), ~110 Ma

Scientific classification
- Kingdom: Animalia
- Phylum: Arthropoda
- Class: Malacostraca
- Order: Decapoda
- Suborder: Pleocyemata
- Infraorder: Anomura
- Family: Probeebeidae
- Genus: †Mutotylaspis; Fraaije, Mychko, Barsukov & Jagt, 2023
- Species: †M. tripudium

Binomial name
- †Mutotylaspis tripudium Fraaije, Mychko, Barsukov & Jagt, 2023

Extinct genus of crustaceans

Mutotylaspis is an extinct monotypic genus of probeebeid hermit crabs that lived in Russia's Vladimir Oblast during the Albian stage of the Lower Cretaceous Epoch, and the only extinct genus in the Probeebeidae family. Its type and only species is Mutotylaspis tripudium.

== Etymology ==
The genus name, Mutotylaspis, is a combination of MUTO (giant monsters, or kaiju, that appear as primary antagonists in the 2014 movie Godzilla) and the genus Tylaspis (another probeebeid that is thought to be the closest living relative of Mutotylaspis).

The name of the type species, tripudium, is Latin for “dancing”, a reference to the pose the type specimen (SVSR, ГМ-436) was found in.
