= Sejus =

Scientific classification
- Kingdom: Animalia
- Phylum: Arthropoda
- Subphylum: Chelicerata
- Class: Arachnida
- Order: Mesostigmata
- Family: Sejidae
- Genus: Sejus (Epicroseius) sp. SJD-2001

Genus of mites

Sejus is a genus of mites in the family Sejidae. There are about 17 described species in Sejus.

== Species ==
These 17 species belong to the genus Sejus:

- Sejus americanus Banks, 1902
- Sejus australis Hirschmann & Kaczmarek, 1991
- Sejus boliviensis Hirschmann & Kaczwarek, 1991
- Sejus camerunis Wisniewski & Hirschmann, 1991
- Sejus carolinensis
- Sejus cascadensis De Leon, 1964
- Sejus congoensis Wisniewski & Hirschmann, 1991
- Sejus longipes (Willmann, 1951)
- Sejus novaezealandiae Fain & Galloway, 1993
- Sejus posnaniensis Hirschmann & Kaczwarek
- Sejus sanborni Packard
- Sejus scimitus
- Sejus solaris Wisniewski & Hirschmann, 1991
- Sejus stebaevi Wisniewski & Hirschmann, 1991
- Sejus tennesseensis De Leon, 1964
- Sejus togatus C.L.Koch, 1836
- † Sejus bdelloides Koch & Berendt, 1854
