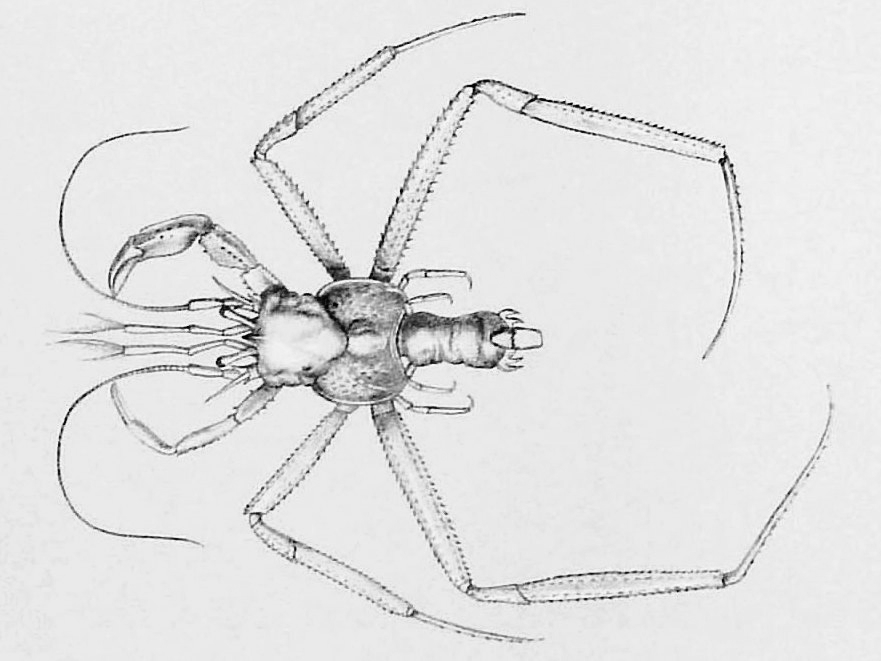
- Illustration

Scientific classification
- Kingdom: Animalia
- Phylum: Arthropoda
- Class: Malacostraca
- Order: Decapoda
- Suborder: Pleocyemata
- Infraorder: Anomura
- Family: Probeebeidae
- Genus: Tylaspis; Henderson, 1885
- Species: T. anomala

Binomial name
- Tylaspis anomala Henderson, 1885

= Tylaspis =

Genus of crustaceans

Tylaspis is a monotypic genus of probeebeid hermit crabs. Its type and only species is Tylaspis anomala.
