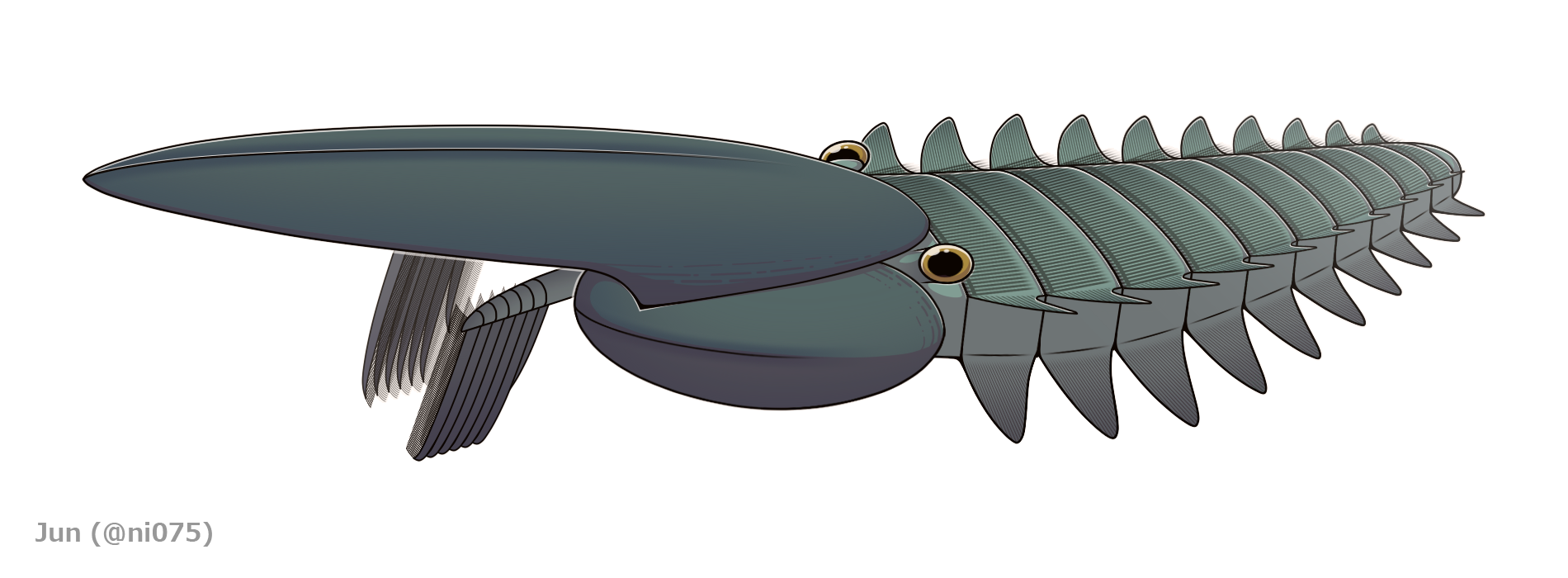
- Restoration of Aegirocassis benmoulai
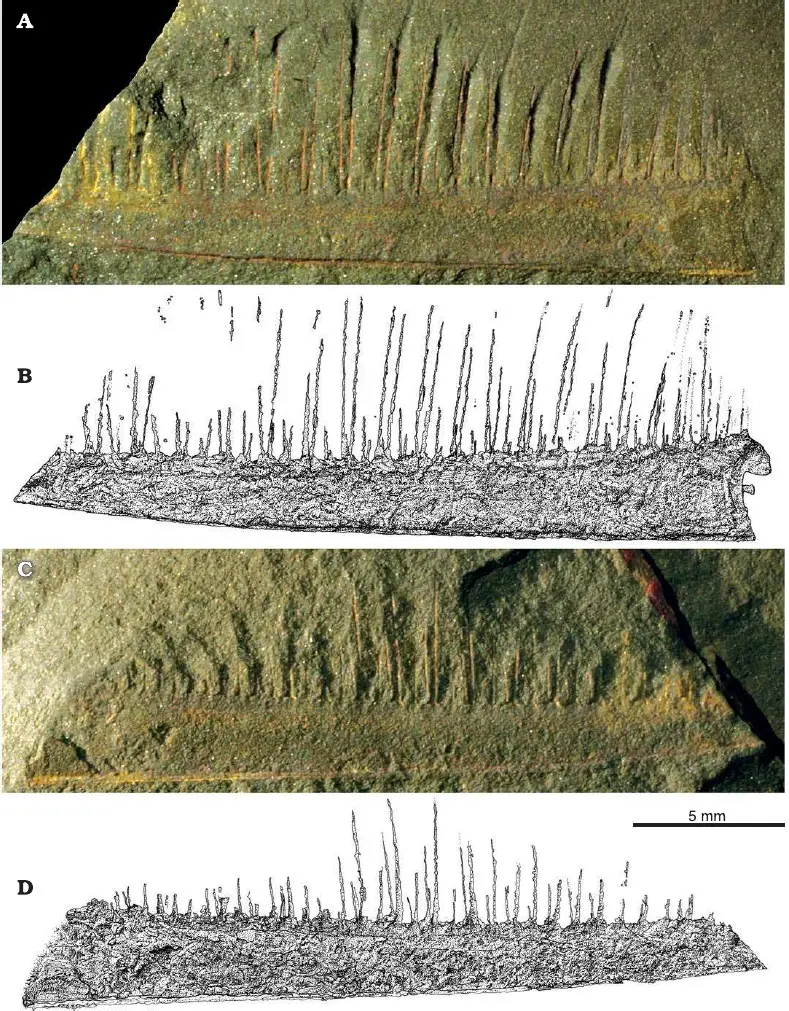
- Fossil endites of Pseudoangustidontus duplospineus

Scientific classification
- Kingdom: Animalia
- Phylum: Arthropoda
- Class: †Dinocaridida
- Order: †Radiodonta
- Family: †Hurdiidae
- Subfamily: †Aegirocassisinae; Potin, Gueriau & Daley, 2023

Genera
- †Aegirocassis; †Pseudoangustidontus

= Aegirocassisinae =

Aegirocassisines Temporal range: Lower Ordovician, Tremadocian–Floian

Subfamily of hurdiid radiodonts

Aegirocassisinae is a subfamily of radiodonts (marine stem-arthropods) from the lower Paleozoic era. It belongs to the larger Hurdiidae (peytoiid) family, which were the most diverse and long lasting radiodonts. The members of this subfamily are restricted to the Lower Ordovician-aged Fezouata Formation of Morocco. Currently only two genera are included: Aegirocassis and Pseudoangustidontus. These two genera possess large Baleen-like auxiliary spines on their frontal appendages, which suggests a suspension feeding lifestyle for the group. These radiodonts are some of the few known from sediments beyond the Cambrian period. This subfamily shows that following the Great Ordovician Biodiversification Event, which saw a rise in the plankton population in the worlds oceans, suspension feeding became more common in radiodonts then other feeding styles. It also seems that due to the evolution of new predators, like large nautiloid cephalopods, and other arthropod groups like the eurypterids, the radiodonts evolved suspension feeding lifestyles in order to minimize competition for food.

== Description ==
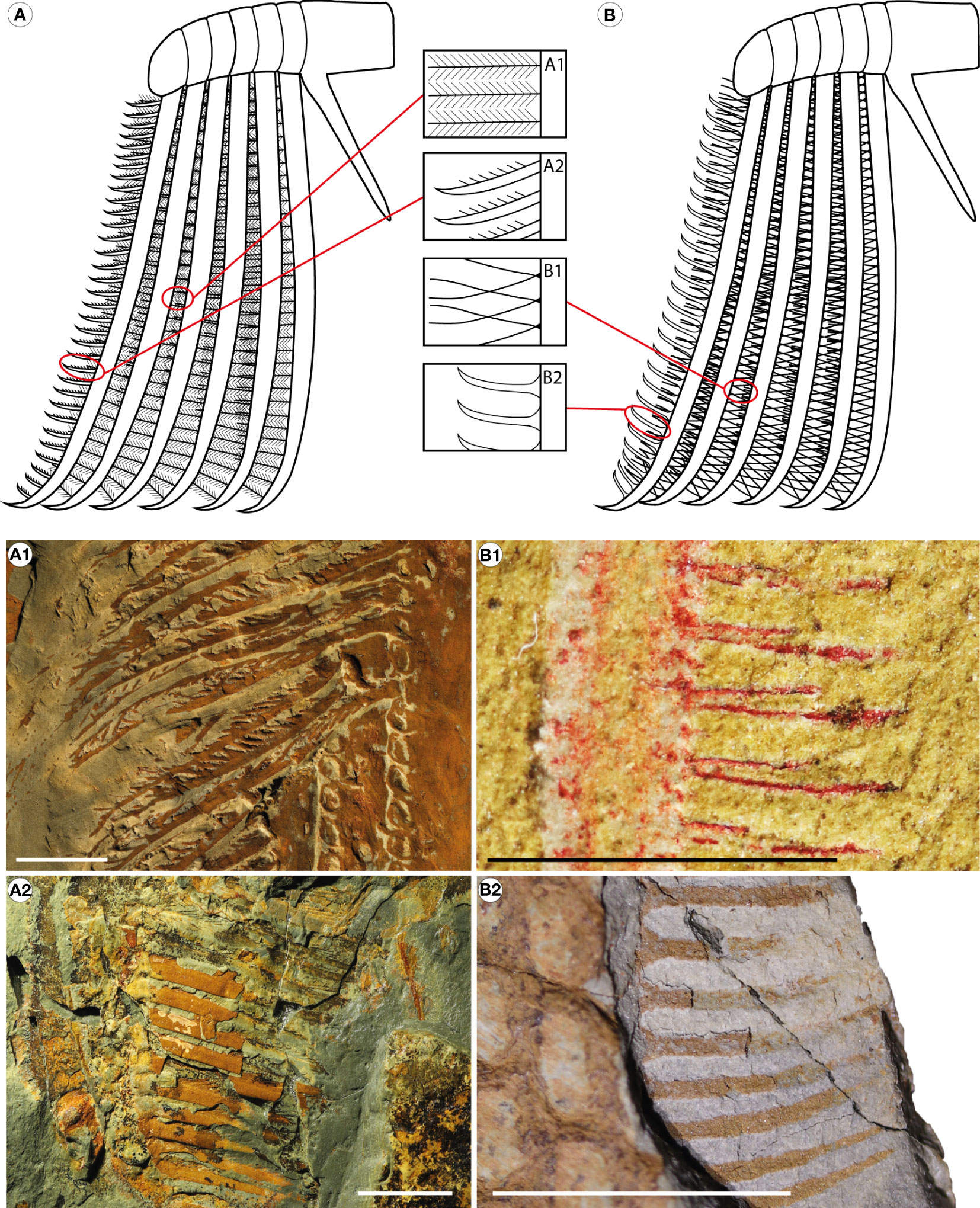
Frontal appendages of Aegirocassis (A, A1, A2) and Pseudoangustidontus (B, B1, B2)

Aegirocassisines are distinguished by their frontal appendages possessing endites that bore long auxiliary spines (the longest of any radiodont). The appendages are composed of around six podomeres that each bore one endite. Although all of the members of this subfamily were suspension feeders, the study notes that other suspension feeding radiodonts (like Tamisiocaris) are not included in this subfamily. This subfamily is named after Aegirocassis and not Pseudoangustidontus, as even though the latter was named before the former, Pseudoangustidontus was previously considered enigmatic before the 2023 studies publication. The aegirocassisines were some of the largest radiodonts, with Aegirocassis reaching a length of up to 2 meters, and Pseudoangustidontus potentially reaching a similar size.
