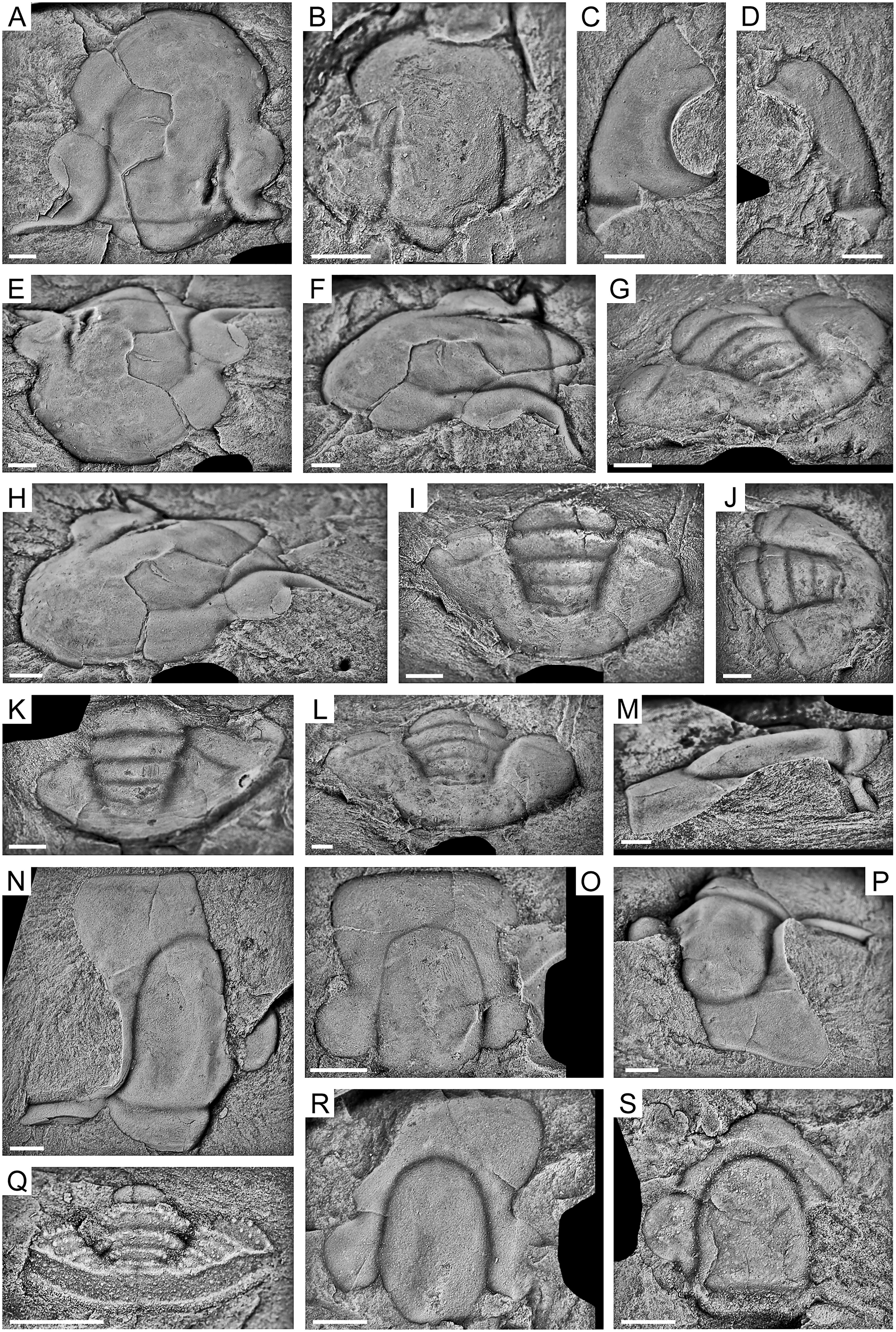
- Specimens of Veeversaspis and Tanybregma

Scientific classification
- Kingdom: Animalia
- Phylum: Arthropoda
- Clade: †Artiopoda
- Class: †Trilobita
- Order: †Proetida
- Family: †Bathyuridae
- Genus: †Veeversaspis; Smith, and Allen, 2023

Type species
- †Veeversaspis jelli Patrick M. Smith, and Heidi J. Allen, 2023

= Veeversaspis =

Veeversaspis Temporal range: Tremadocian, 485.4–477.7 Ma

Genus of bathyurid trilobite from the Early Ordovician

Veeversaspis (/ˌvɪvərˈzæspɪs/) (meaning "Veevers' shield") is an extinct genus of bathyurid trilobite from the Nambeet Formation in Western Australia. The type species is M. jelli, known from multiple partial specimens.

== Description ==
Veeversaspis is known from multiple specimens which were described in 2023 by Smith, and Allen, (2023). The holotype, GSWAF55755 measures at around 14 mm (0.6 in), and is a partial cranidium.

== Etymology ==
The generic name, Veeversaspis (/ˌvɪvərˈzæspɪs/), is named in honour of J.J. Veevers (Macquarie University; Sydney), for the initial documentation of trilobites from the Canning Basin. And the Greek word "aspis" which means shield and is also a common component of trilobite generic names. The specific name, jelli (/dʒɛlaɪ/), was named in honour of P.A. Jell (University of Queensland; Brisbane), for his extensive contribution to Australian trilobite studies.
