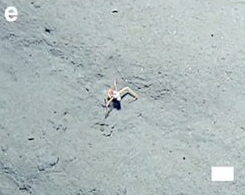
- Probeebei mirabilis

Scientific classification
- Kingdom: Animalia
- Phylum: Arthropoda
- Clade: Pancrustacea
- Class: Malacostraca
- Order: Decapoda
- Suborder: Pleocyemata
- Infraorder: Anomura
- Superfamily: Paguroidea
- Family: Probeebeidae; Boone, 1926

Type genus
- Probeebei Boone, 1926

Other genera
- See text

= Probeebeidae =

Probeebeidae Temporal range: Lower Cretaceous (Albian)-Present Late Jurassic origin

Family of crustaceans

The Probeebeidae are a family of marine hermit crabs with fossils dating back to the Albian stage of the Lower Cretaceous Epoch. The family is thought to have originated somewhere in the Late Jurassic.

== Genera ==
Probeebeidae contains three genera (two extant, one extinct).

- †Mutotylaspis Fraaije, Mychko, Barsukov & Jagt, 2023
- Probeebei Boone, 1926 (type)
- Tylaspis Henderson, 1885
