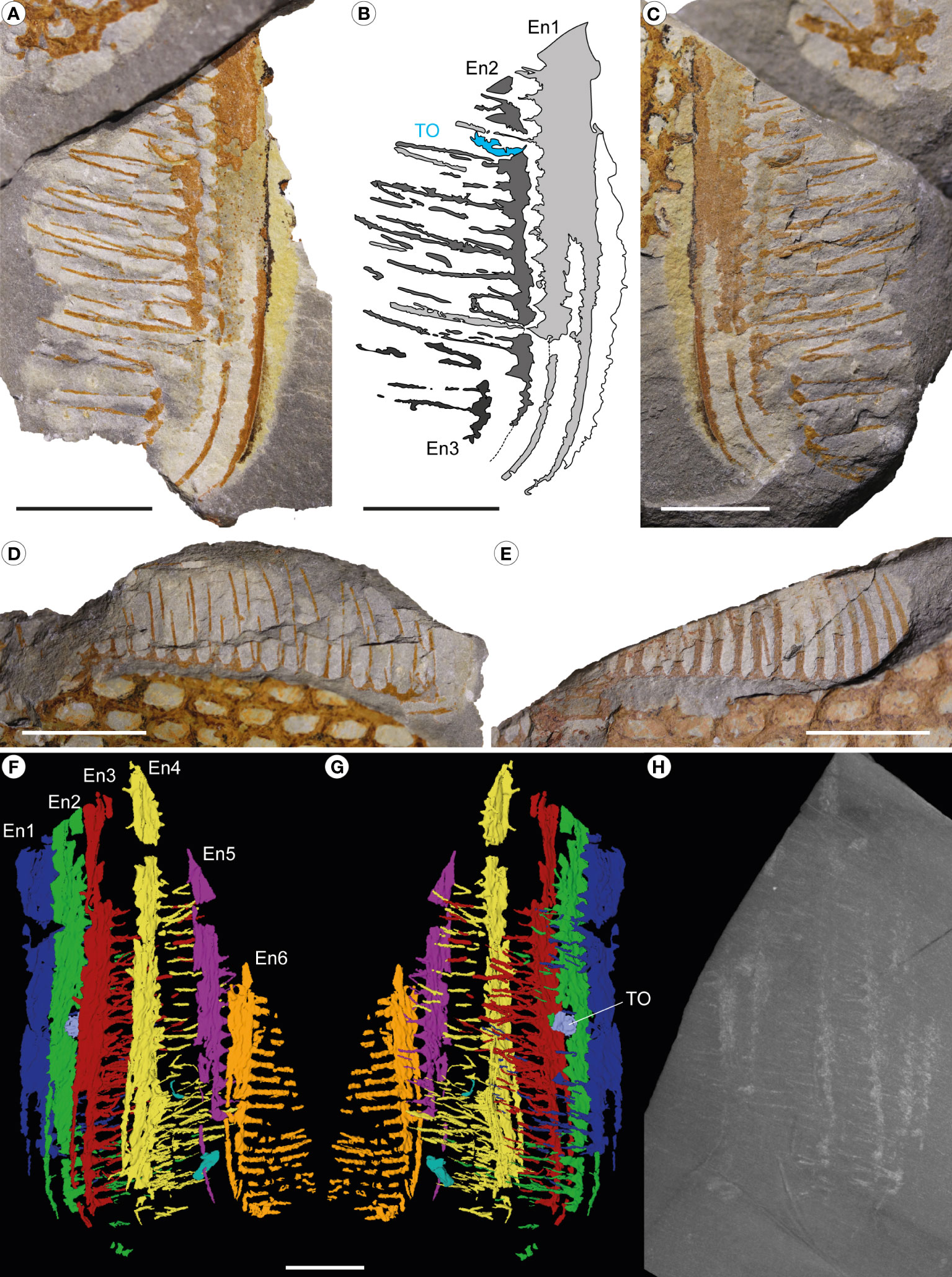
- Fossil appendage of P. izdigua with 3D rendering (F-G)

Scientific classification
- Kingdom: Animalia
- Stem group: Arthropoda
- Class: †Dinocaridida
- Order: †Radiodonta
- Family: †Hurdiidae
- Subfamily: †Aegirocassisinae
- Genus: †Pseudoangustidontus; Van Roy & Tetlie, 2006

Species
- †Pseudoangustidontus duplospineus Van Roy & Tetlie, 2006; †Pseudoangustidontus izdigua Potin, Gueriau & Daley, 2023

= Pseudoangustidontus =

Pseudoangustidontus Temporal range: Lower Ordovician, Tremadocian–Floian

Hurdiid radiodont from the Lower Ordovician

Pseudoangustidontus (meaning "false Angustidontus") is a genus of hurdiid (peytoiid) radiodont from the Lower Ordovician of Morocco. This genus includes two described species, Pseudoangustidontus duplospineus and Pseudoangustidontus izidigua, which both belong to the smaller Aegirocassisinae subfamily, however, a third unnamed species is also known. This animal is only known from the Fezouata Formation, a lower Ordovician fossil site in Morocco that is of Konservat-Lagerstätten status, meaning that the fossils from this site are exceptionally well preserved. This taxon was first described in 2006, but due to the fragmentary remains known at the time, its classification was debated, but with more complete fossils, this taxon was identified as a hurdiid radiodont in 2023. Similarly to its larger relative, Aegirocassis benmoulae, this radiodont is thought to have lived a primarily filter feeding lifestyle, using its numerous auxiliary spines to grab small organisms from the water.

== Background ==
Located in the Draa Valley of southeastern Morocco, the Fezouata Formation is a lower Ordovician (Tremadocian – Floian) aged geologic formation well known for its exceptional preservation of soft-bodied marine organisms. The soft body producing layers of the formation, known as the Fezouata Lagerstätte, were first identified in the late 1990s, when Ben Moula, a local fossil collector in the area, showed some uncovered specimens to a PhD student working in the area, and the soon to be discovered ecosystem would come to be known as the Fezouata Biota. The formation is especially important, as it helped bridge the gap between Cambrian-type and Ordovician-type faunas, showing that many groups of organisms once thought to have gone extinct at the end of the Cambrian, survived the transition into the Ordovician. The site is highly productive, with around 50 distinct taxa being represented from over 1,500 specimens, with the majority of said specimens coming from two small intervals of the formation around 25 metres (82 ft) and 15 metres (49 ft) thick, compared to the nearly 1,000 metres (3,300 ft) thickness of the whole formation. During the Ordovician, the area that would become Morocco was situated much closer to the South Pole then it is today, and the ecosystem of Fezouata lived in a storm wave base roughly 50 and 150 metres (160 and 490 ft) underwater. The organisms in the environment were preserved in situ, and because of storms in the area helping to facilitate rapid sediment deposition, the majority of known organisms were benthic in nature.

== Discovery and etymology ==
The fossil specimens belonging to Pseudoangustidontus, more specifically the species P. duplospineus, were discovered in the upper strata of the Fezouata Formation, and were subsequently described by Van Roy & Tetlie, 2006. However, because the fossils were found by local collectors, and were brought to the authors' attention via circulation, the exact locality of origin is uncertain, with several sites located near the town of Zagora being possible candidates. Because of its unique appearance and fragmentary state, the taxon would be considered problematic (in terms of its taxonomy), but would later be identified as a radiodont later on in 2023. In that same year, a second species, P. izdigua, was described based on differences in spine length compared to the type species, and is known from more complete remains (endites, frontal appendages, and a partial h-element).There is also a currently unnamed species, but due to its fragmentary state, is unassignable aside from genus level classification.

The genus name, Pseudoangustidontus, is derived from the Greek word pseudes, meaning "false", and the genus name Angustidontus, an unrelated pelagic crustacean from the Devonian-Carboniferous periods, due to similarities between the raptorial limbs of Angustidontus, and the endites of P. duplospineus, while still acknowledging the differences between the two taxa. The type species name, duplospineus, is derived from the Latin words duplus, meaning "double", and spineus, meaning "spiny", or "thorny", highlighting the double pair of auxiliary spines seen in the species. The other species name, izdigua, is derived from the Tamazight word izdigue, which means "filter", highlighting the filter feeding nature of the taxon.

== Description ==
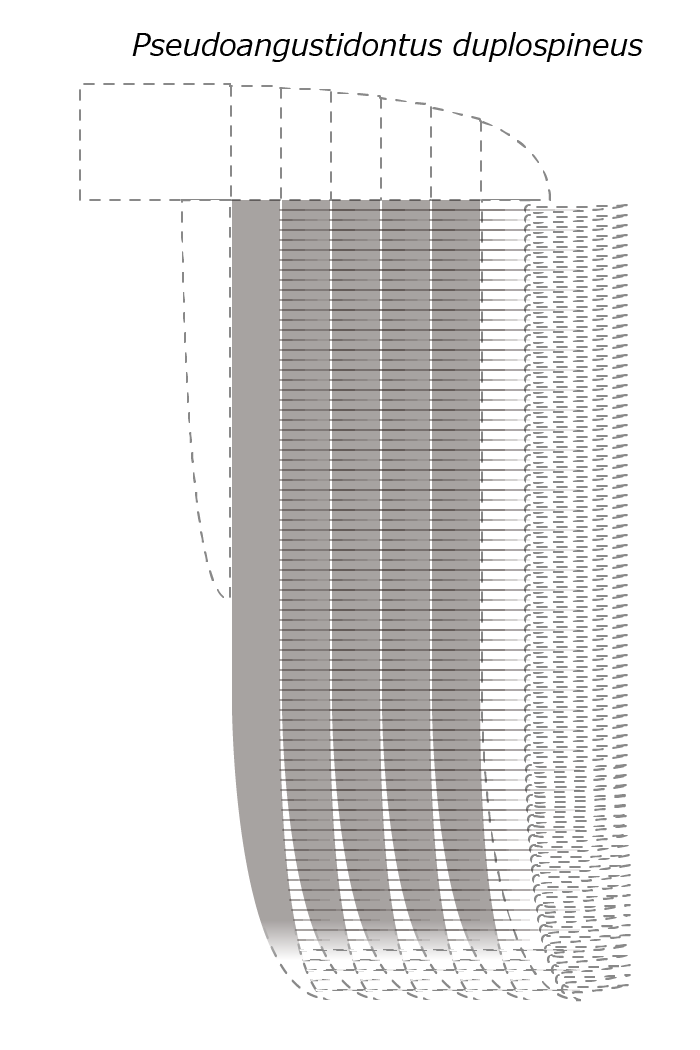
Reconstruction of the frontal appendage of P. duplospineus

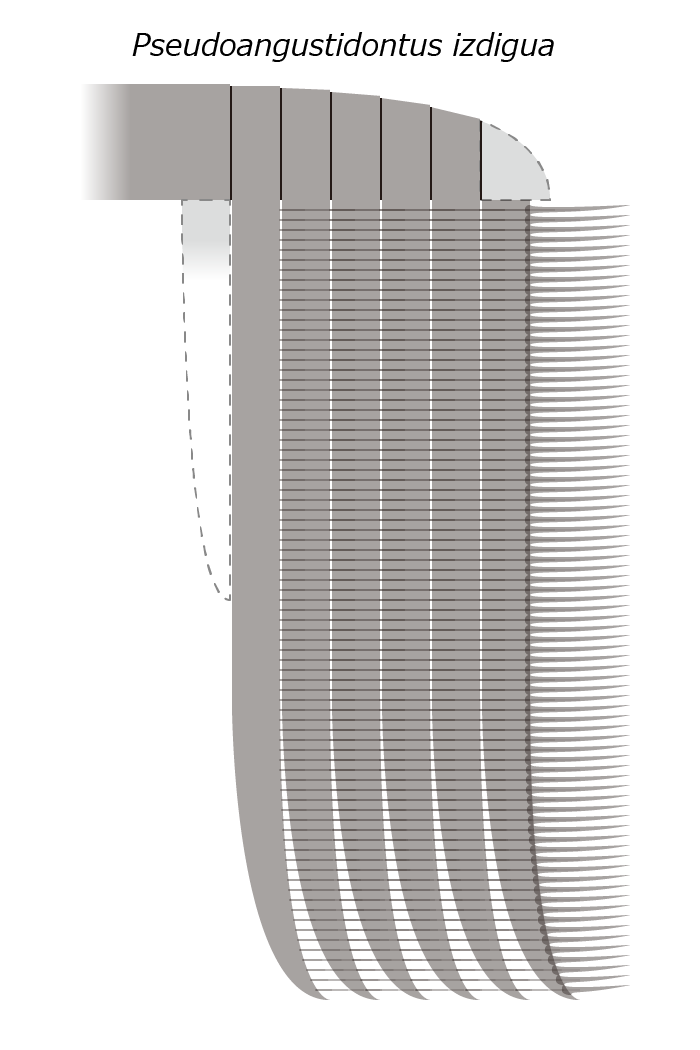
Reconstruction of the frontal appendage of P. izdigua

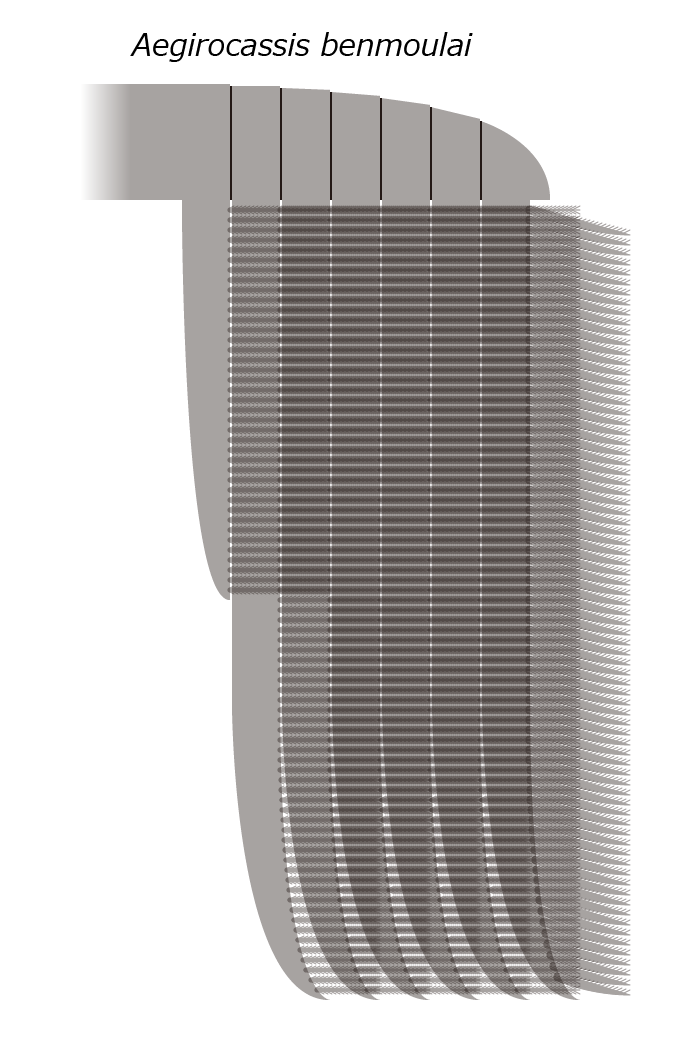
Reconstruction of the frontal appendage of Aegirocassis for comparison

Pseudoangustidontus is only known from frontal appendage remains, with an exception of MGL 108047_1, the holotype of P. izidigua, which preserved part of a frontal sclerite (H-element). P. duplospineus had paired auxiliary spines alternating in length short/long while the frontal appendages of P. izdigua bore endites with spines that are equal in length. P. duplospineus is differentiated from its close relative Aegirocassis due to the paired spines on its frontal appendages, with the shorter spines being equal in length compared to the width of the endites, and the longer spines being nearly twice as long compared to the endite width.

== Classification ==
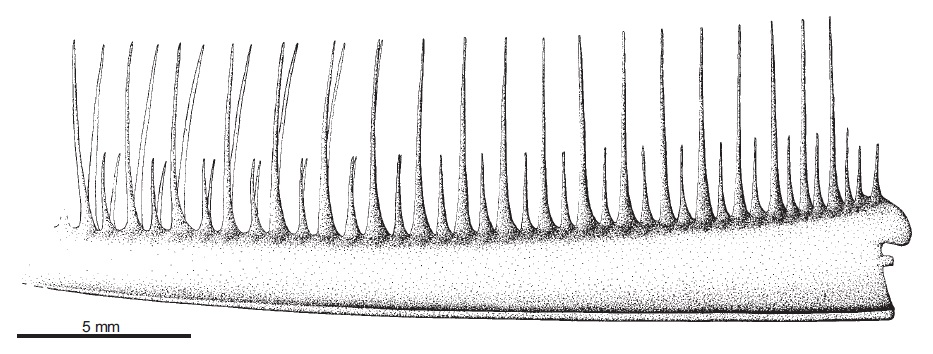
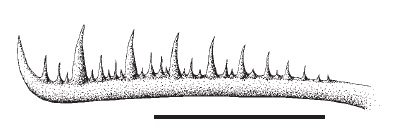
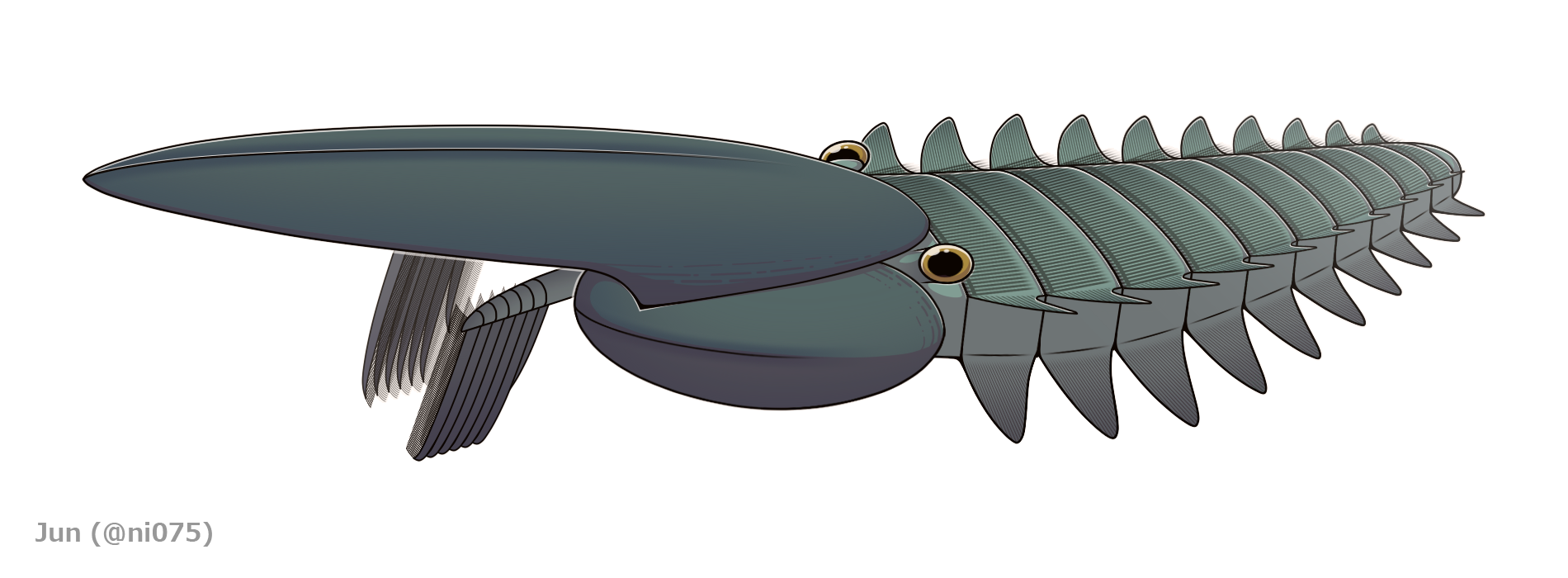
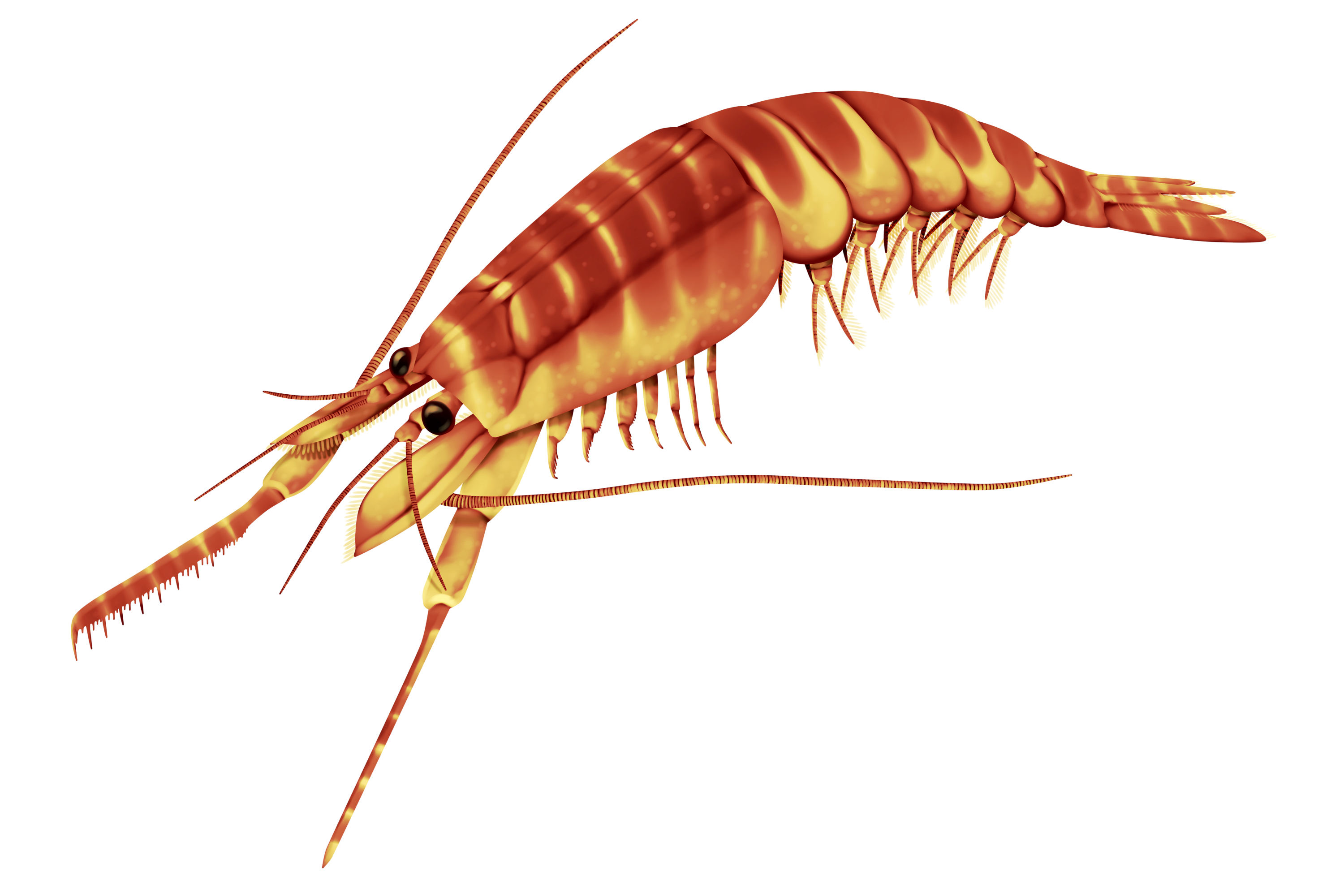
Originally morphology of a fossil of P. duplospineus (top left) was compared to the appendages of Angustidontus (top right).
However, Pseudoangustidontus was later found to be a hurdiid radiodont like Aegirocassis (bottom left), while Angustidontus (bottom right) is a crustacean.

When described in 2006, the only known fossils of this genus were isolated endites that bore copious amounts of auxiliary spines. Because of this, the taxonomy of this stem-arthropod was debated, with possible suggestions of its affinity being with the eurypterids of the megalograptidae family, radiodonts, or crustaceans such as Angustidontus. In a review article published in 2023, it was questionably placed in the Hurdiidae. And in another paper that was released in the same year, and published by Potin, Gueriau & Daley, 2023, described newly found fossils, and found it to be closely related to Aegirocassis, and both into the subfamily Aegirocassisinae. The family that the Aegirocassisinae subfamily belongs to, the Hurdiidae, were the most diverse and long lasting lineage of radiodonts, usually characterized by subequal endites, a tetraradial oral cone, and large frontal sclerites (which in some species reach, or exceed the total body length).

== Paleoecology ==
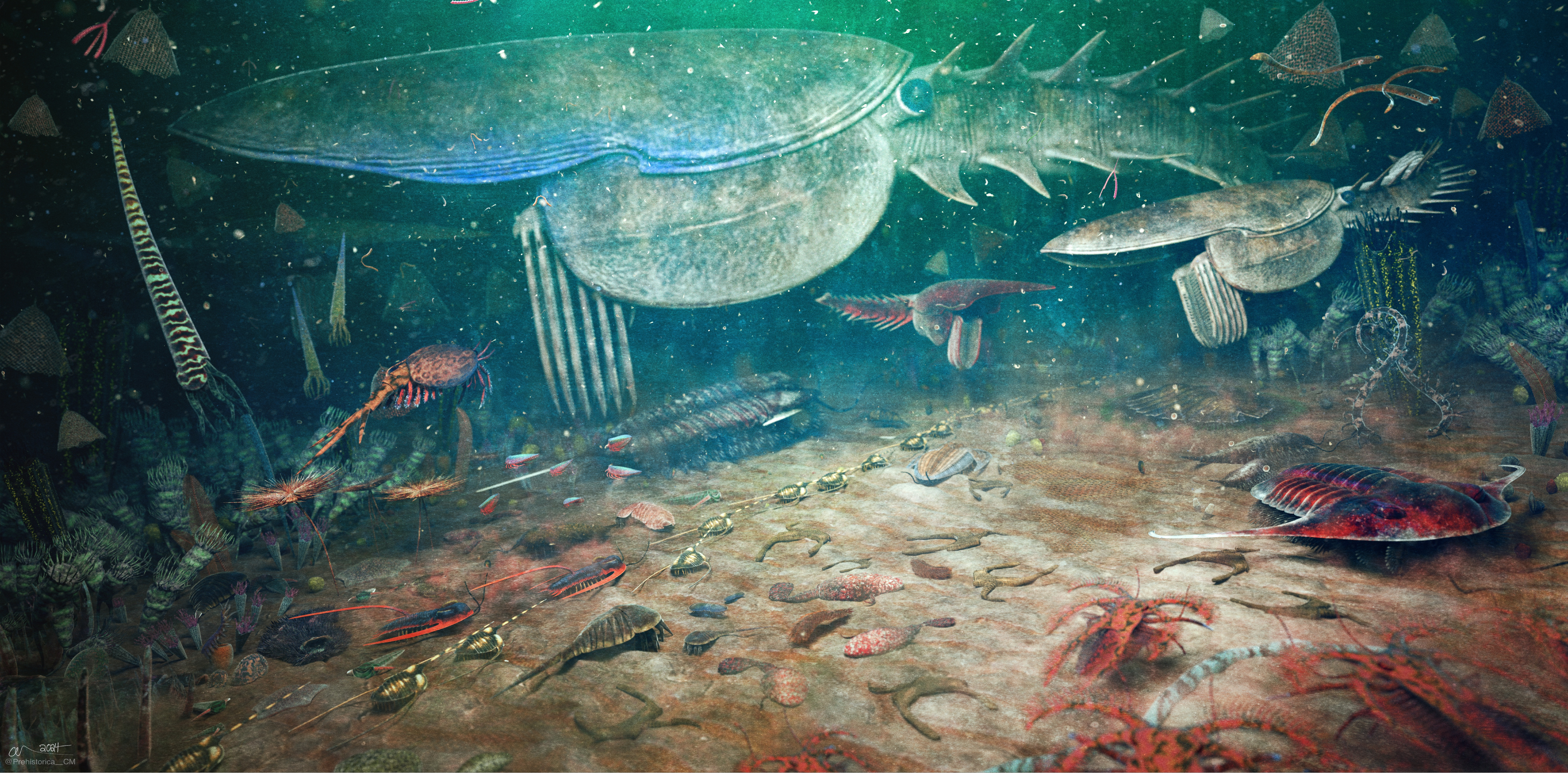
Reconstruction of the Fezouata Biota, with both P. duplospineus and P. izdigua being present (below and behind the larger Aegirocassis respectively).

Pseudoangustidontus is speculated to be a filter feeder similar to Aegirocassis, that used numerous auxiliary spines on its frontal appendages as mesh to catch microorganisms, similarly to the baleen seen in various cetacean species. The spine and mesh size of the frontal appendages of Pseudoangustidontus is around 0.5 mm, slightly smaller than that of Aegirocassis (0.56 mm), both genera probably fed on mesoplankton. However, a specimen of P. izdigua had an unidentified shell or carapace with a diameter about 3 mm trapped in its setae, suggesting it could have fed on even larger prey.
