= Asternolaelaps =

Scientific classification
- Domain: Eukaryota
- Kingdom: Animalia
- Phylum: Arthropoda
- Subphylum: Chelicerata
- Class: Arachnida
- Order: Mesostigmata
- Family: Ichthyostomatogasteridae
- Genus: Asternolaelaps; Berlese, 1923
- Species: A. fecundus

Binomial name
- Asternolaelaps fecundus Berlese, 1923

Genus of mites

Asternolaelaps is a genus of mites in the family Ichthyostomatogasteridae. There is at least one described species in Asternolaelaps, A. fecundus.
