= Peltarion spinulosum =

Scientific classification
- Domain: Eukaryota
- Kingdom: Animalia
- Phylum: Arthropoda
- Class: Malacostraca
- Order: Decapoda
- Suborder: Pleocyemata
- Infraorder: Brachyura
- Family: Trichopeltariidae
- Genus: Peltarion; Hombron & Jacquinot, 1846
- Species: P. spinulosum

Binomial name
- Peltarion spinulosum (White, 1843)

Synonyms
- Genus synonymy: Hypopeltarion Ortmann, 1893; Hypopeltarium Miers, 1886; Species synonymy: Atelecyclus chilensis Nicolet, 1849; Atelecyclus spinulosus White, 1843; Peltarion magellanicus Hombron & Jacquinot, 1846

Species of crab

Peltarion is a genus of crabs belonging to the family Trichopeltariidae. It is a monotypic genus, whose only species is Peltarion spinulosum.

The species of this genus are found in Southern America.
