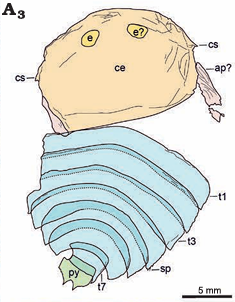
- Illustration of Tonglaiia bispinosa

Scientific classification
- Kingdom: Animalia
- Phylum: Arthropoda
- Clade: †Artiopoda
- Subphylum: †Trilobitomorpha
- Genus: †Tonglaiia; Zhu et al., 2023

Type species
- †Tonglaiia bispinosa Zhu et al., 2023

= Tonglaiia =

Tonglaiia Temporal range: Cambrian Stage 3

Extinct genus of artiopods

Tonglaiia is an extinct genus of trilobitomorph artiopod that lived during Stage 3 of the Cambrian period. It is considered to be the sister taxon to the clade Conciliterga. The type and only species is Tonglaiia bispinosa.

The holotype, NIGP 200050, was discovered in Malong District in 2023. It measures at 2.7 centimetres (1.1 in) in length and 1.9 centimetres (0.75 in) in width, preserving the cephalon (head) as well as parts of the thorax and abdomen. The genus is named after Tonglai County, which was the former name of Malong District prior to the Tang dynasty, and the name of the type species is a combination of the Latin prefix "bi-" (double) and adjective "spinosa" (spinous), which would make the meaning of bispinosa roughly "two spines".
