= Uropodella =

Scientific classification
- Domain: Eukaryota
- Kingdom: Animalia
- Phylum: Arthropoda
- Subphylum: Chelicerata
- Class: Arachnida
- Order: Mesostigmata
- Family: Uropodellidae
- Genus: Uropodella; Berlese, 1888
- Species: U. laciniata

Binomial name
- Uropodella laciniata Berlese

Genus of mites

Uropodella is a genus of mites in the family Uropodellidae. There is one described species in Uropodella, U. laciniata.
