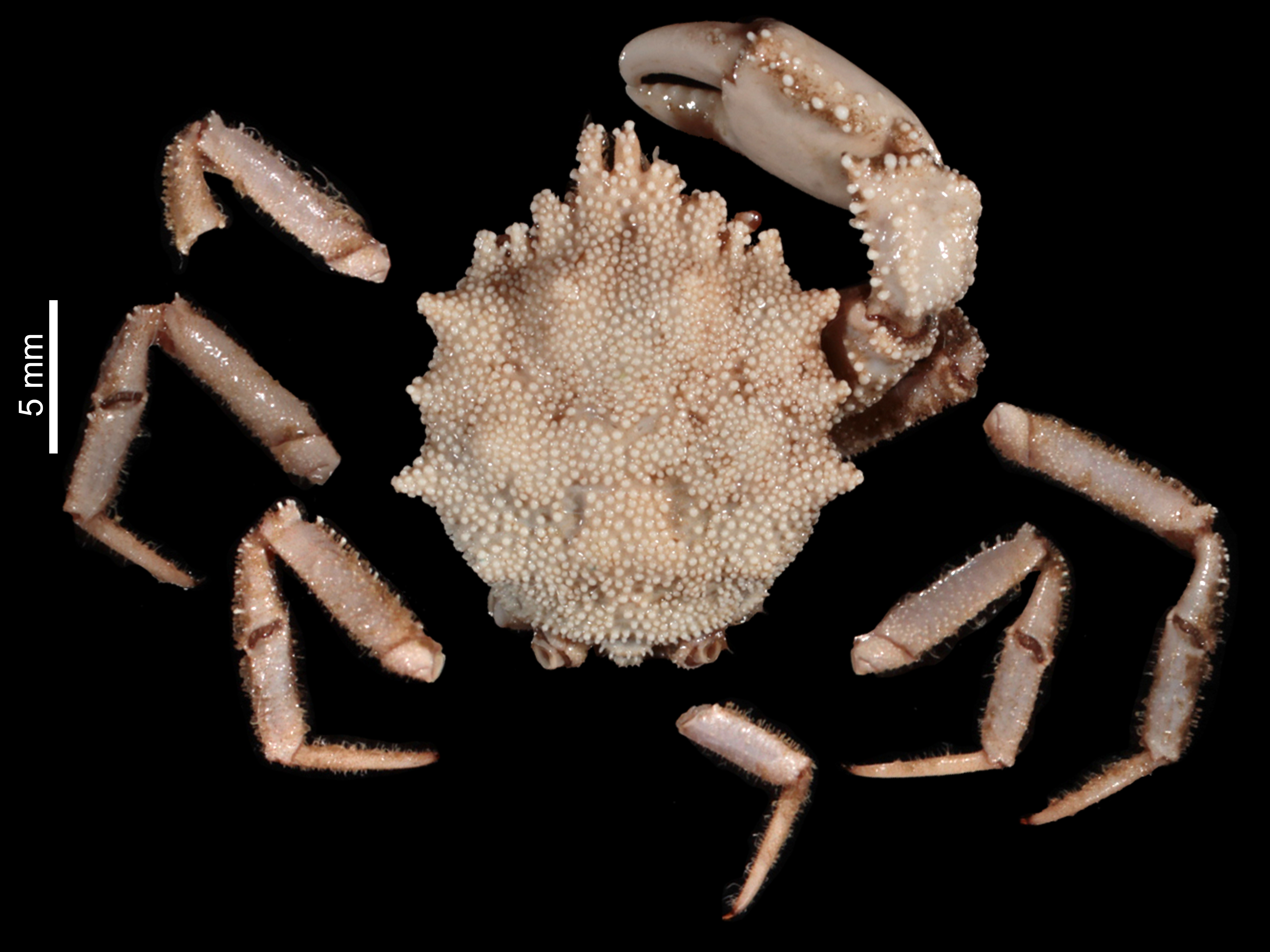
- Trichopeltarion intesi

Scientific classification
- Kingdom: Animalia
- Phylum: Arthropoda
- Class: Malacostraca
- Order: Decapoda
- Suborder: Pleocyemata
- Infraorder: Brachyura
- Superfamily: Trichopeltarioidea
- Family: Trichopeltariidae; Tavares & Cleva, 2010

= Trichopeltariidae =

Family of crabs

Trichopeltariidae is a family of crabs.

== Genera ==
The family contains five genera:

- Peltarion Hombron & Jacquinot, 1846
- Podocatactes Ortmann, 1893
- Pteropeltarion Dell, 1972
- Sphaeropeltarion Tavares & Cleva, 2010
- Trichopeltarion A. Milne-Edwards, 1880
