= Hypoaspis =

Scientific classification
- Domain: Eukaryota
- Kingdom: Animalia
- Phylum: Arthropoda
- Subphylum: Chelicerata
- Class: Arachnida
- Order: Mesostigmata
- Family: Laelapidae
- Subfamily: Hypoaspidinae
- Genus: Hypoaspis; G.Canestrini, 1884

Genus of mites

Hypoaspis is a genus of mites in the family Laelapidae.

== Description ==
Hypoaspis is superficially similar to related genera such as Coleolaelaps, Mumulaelaps and Promacrolaelaps. It can be distinguished by: a rounded and oval dorsal shield without lateral incisions, and with 35–40 pairs of setae including one or more pairs of Zx setae; opisthonotal seta Z4 being very long and wavy; the sternal shield having a distinct anterior margin; h3 being longest out of the hypostomal setae; the first leg pair being longer than the third leg pair; the second and third femurs on each side with macrosetae present; the tarsus of the second leg pair with thick subterminal spines; and the post-anal seta shorter than or equal in length to the para-anal setae.

This genus of mites is often associated with beetles, especially scarab beetles, but the nature of this association is uncertain. Hypoaspis may be parasites of eggs and larvae, or they may be commensals that feed on beetle exudates or on other small invertebrates associated with beetles.

== Biological control ==
The genus once contained the species H. aculeifer and H. miles, which are used for biological pest control of sciarid and phorid fly larvae in mushrooms. However, these species have since been moved to genera Gaeolaelaps and Stratiolaelaps, respectively.

== Species ==
The composition of Hypoaspis is uncertain. It has historically been a large genus with multiple subgenera. It was later reduced to only the members of subgenus Hypoaspis (Hypoaspis) or Hypoaspis sensu stricto. There are currently 36 species.

Below is a list of species currently and formerly included in Hypoaspis:

- Hypoaspis aciphila Karg, 1987
- Hypoaspis acme Womersley, 1955
- Hypoaspis aculeifer (G. Canestrini, 1884)
- Hypoaspis aculeiferoides Teng, 1982
- Hypoaspis acutiscutus (Teng, 1982)
- Hypoaspis analis Karg, 1982
- Hypoaspis angulatus (Berlese, 1916)
- Hypoaspis angusta Karg, 1965
- Hypoaspis anserina Karg, 1981
- Hypoaspis ardoris Karg, 1993
- Hypoaspis armstrongi (Womersley, 1956)
- Hypoaspis astronomica (C.L. Koch, 1839)
- Hypoaspis australis Hull, 1923
- Hypoaspis austriacus (Sellnick, 1935)
- Hypoaspis aviator (Berlese, 1920))
- Hypoaspis baichengensis Ma, 2000
- Hypoaspis barbarae Strong, 1995
- Hypoaspis barbatula Karg, 1989
- Hypoaspis berlesei Bernhard, 1973
- Hypoaspis bipennata Karg, 2003
- Hypoaspis bispinosa Karg, 1997
- Hypoaspis blattae Strong & Halliday, 1994
- Hypoaspis brevidentis Karg, 1978
- Hypoaspis brevipedestra Karg, 1985
- Hypoaspis brevipellis Karg, 1979
- Hypoaspis brevistilis Karg, 1978
- Hypoaspis campestris (Berlese, 1887)
- Hypoaspis cassoidea Karg, 1981
- Hypoaspis cerata Karg, 1982
- Hypoaspis changlingensis Ma, 2000
- Hypoaspis chelaris Teng, Zhang & Cui, 1992
- Hypoaspis chianensis Gu, 1990
- Hypoaspis chini (Bai & Gu, 1993)
- Hypoaspis chongqingensis Ma, Zhang & Li, 2003
- Hypoaspis ciconia Karg, 1979
- Hypoaspis claviger (Berlese, 1883)
- Hypoaspis collina Huhta & Karg, 2010
- Hypoaspis comelicensis (Lombardini, 1962)
- Hypoaspis concinna Teng, 1982
- Hypoaspis corpolongus (Rosario, 1981)
- Hypoaspis corpulentus (Berlese, 1920)
- Hypoaspis cubaensis Karg, 1981
- Hypoaspis cuneifer Michael, 1891
- Hypoaspis cursoria Karg, 1988
- Hypoaspis dailingensis Ma & Yin, 1998
- Hypoaspis debilis Ma, 1996
- Hypoaspis decellei van-Driel, Loots & Marais, 1977
- Hypoaspis decemsetae Karg, 1994
- Hypoaspis deinos Zeman, 1982
- Hypoaspis dendrophilus (Davydova, 1977)
- Hypoaspis dentipilosa Karg, 1978
- Hypoaspis digitalis (Teng, 1981)
- Hypoaspis disjuncta Hunter & Yeh, 1969
- Hypoaspis disparatus (Banks, 1916)
- Hypoaspis diversa Karg, 1994
- Hypoaspis elegans Joharchi, Ostovan & Babaeian, 2014
- Hypoaspis elegantula (Berlese, 1903)
- Hypoaspis elimata Berlese, 1920
- Hypoaspis equitans (Michael, 1891)
- Hypoaspis euarmata Karg, 1996
- Hypoaspis eucapillata Karg, 2003
- Hypoaspis eugenitalis Karg, 1978
- Hypoaspis eupatori (Womersley, 1956)
- Hypoaspis eupraedonis Karg, 1989
- Hypoaspis eupygidialis Karg, 2003
- Hypoaspis euventricosa Karg, 1995
- Hypoaspis evansi Arutunian, 1993
- Hypoaspis expolita (Berlese, 1904)
- Hypoaspis exquisita Karg, 1989
- Hypoaspis femorata Karg, 1978
- Hypoaspis finitima (Berlese, 1903))
- Hypoaspis fishtowni Ruf & Koehler, 1993
- Hypoaspis formationis Karg, 1989
- Hypoaspis furcatoides Karg, 1981
- Hypoaspis glabra Karg, 1978
- Hypoaspis gladii Karg, 1993
- Hypoaspis gleba Karg, 1979
- Hypoaspis guttaforma Karg, 1989
- Hypoaspis guttulata Karg, 1978
- Hypoaspis haiyuanensis Bai, Chen & Gu, 1994
- Hypoaspis hefeiensis Xu & Liang, 1996
- Hypoaspis hermaphroditoides Oudemans, 1902
- Hypoaspis heteronychus (Womersley, 1956)
- Hypoaspis hoffmannae Smiley, Baker & Delfinado-Baker, 1996
- Hypoaspis hunanensis Ma & Zheng, 2000
- Hypoaspis inarmata Karg, 1997
- Hypoaspis inepilis Banks, 1916
- Hypoaspis integer (Berlese, 1911)
- Hypoaspis inversus (Banks, 1916)
- Hypoaspis isodentis Karg, 1989
- Hypoaspis isotricha (Kolenati, 1858)
- Hypoaspis jambar Ishikawa, 1985
- Hypoaspis krameri (G. Canestrini & R. Canestrini, 1881)
- Hypoaspis krantzi Arutunian, 1993
- Hypoaspis larvicolus Joharchi & Halliday, 2011
- Hypoaspis latanalis Karg, 2000
- Hypoaspis latodentis Karg, 1993
- Hypoaspis lepoauris Karg, 1981
- Hypoaspis lepta Oudemans, 1902
- Hypoaspis leptolingua Karg, 1994
- Hypoaspis liae (Bai & Gu, 1993)
- Hypoaspis lingua Karg, 1987
- Hypoaspis liui (Samsinak, 1962)
- Hypoaspis loksai Karg, 2000
- Hypoaspis longanalis Karg, 2003
- Hypoaspis longchuanensis Gu & Duan, 1991
- Hypoaspis longichaetus Ma, 1996
- Hypoaspis longicostalis Karg, 1978
- Hypoaspis longodigiti Karg, 1979
- Hypoaspis longogenitalis Karg, 1978
- Hypoaspis louisensis Loots, 1980
- Hypoaspis lusisi Lapina, 1976
- Hypoaspis luteus (Oudemans, 1917)
- Hypoaspis lyratus (Banks, 1916)
- Hypoaspis mabilogus (Rosario, 1981)
- Hypoaspis macra Karg, 1978
- Hypoaspis macrochaeta Karg, 1988
- Hypoaspis magkadikitus (Rosario, 1981)
- Hypoaspis magnisetae Ma, 1988
- Hypoaspis mahuncai Karg, 1988
- Hypoaspis malakutsilyus (Rosario, 1981)
- Hypoaspis mandibularis (Ewing, 1909)
- Hypoaspis maryamae Joharchi & Halliday, 2011
- Hypoaspis masculina Karg, 1988
- Hypoaspis matinikus (Rosario, 1981)
- Hypoaspis mediocuspis (Karg, 1981)
- Hypoaspis melolonthae Joharchi & Halliday, 2011
- Hypoaspis metapodalii Karg, 1978
- Hypoaspis michaeli Huhta & Karg, 2010
- Hypoaspis miles (Berlese, 1892)
- Hypoaspis militiformis Oudemans, 1902
- Hypoaspis millipedus (Rosario, 1981)
- Hypoaspis minusculus Banks, 1916
- Hypoaspis mohrii Ishikawa, 1982
- Hypoaspis moseri Hunter & Glover, 1968
- Hypoaspis mumai Hunter & Glover, 1968
- Hypoaspis nana (Mégnin, 1876)
- Hypoaspis nasoseta Karg, 1981
- Hypoaspis neimongolianus Ma-Liming & Wang-Shenron, 1998
- Hypoaspis neocuneifer Evans & Till, 1966
- Hypoaspis ningxiaensis (Bai & Gu, 1993)
- Hypoaspis nolli Karg, 1962
- Hypoaspis oblongus (Halbert, 1915)
- Hypoaspis onustus (Berlese, 1904)
- Hypoaspis oreithyiae (Walter & Oliver, 1989)
- Hypoaspis orientalis Bei & Yin, 2000
- Hypoaspis ornatus (Berlese, 1903)
- Hypoaspis ovatus Ma, Ning & You-Wen, 2003
- Hypoaspis ovisuga (Berlese, 1903)
- Hypoaspis pahabaeus (Rosario, 1981)
- Hypoaspis pannicula Karg, 1981
- Hypoaspis paraculeifer (Rosario, 1981)
- Hypoaspis paracuneifer Gu & Bai, 1992
- Hypoaspis passalus (Rosario, 1981)
- Hypoaspis paucidentis Karg, 1989
- Hypoaspis pellucida Berlese, 1904
- Hypoaspis penicillata Karg, 1979
- Hypoaspis picketti Hunter & Glover, 1968
- Hypoaspis pinnae Karg, 1987
- Hypoaspis postreticulatus Xu & Liang, 1996
- Hypoaspis praesternalis Willmann, 1949
- Hypoaspis praesternaloides Ma & Yin, 1998
- Hypoaspis praetarsalis Karg, 1978
- Hypoaspis pratensis Huhta & Karg, 2010
- Hypoaspis pugiocuspis Karg, 1981
- Hypoaspis pugni Karg, 1979
- Hypoaspis punyalus (Rosario, 1981)
- Hypoaspis pycnosis Karg, 1979
- Hypoaspis qinghaiensis Li-Chao, Yang-Xizheng & Yue-Shanlon, 1997
- Hypoaspis queenslandicus (Womersley, 1956)
- Hypoaspis quinquepara Karg, 2000
- Hypoaspis rarosae (Rosario, 1981)
- Hypoaspis relictovi Senotrusova, 1982
- Hypoaspis reticulatus Xu & Liang, 1996
- Hypoaspis rhizotrogi Masan, 1998
- Hypoaspis rhopaea (Womersley, 1956)
- Hypoaspis rigensis Lapina, 1976
- Hypoaspis rosei Strong & Halliday, 1994
- Hypoaspis ruggi Strong & Halliday, 1994
- Hypoaspis saana Huhta & Karg, 2010
- Hypoaspis sardous (Berlese, 1911)
- Hypoaspis schusteri (Hirschmann, 1966)
- Hypoaspis seriopilosa Karg, 1978
- Hypoaspis serpentis Karg, 1979
- Hypoaspis serrata Karg, 1979
- Hypoaspis shenyangensis Bei, Shi & Yin, 2003
- Hypoaspis similisetae Karg, 1965
- Hypoaspis simplex (Berlese, 1920)
- Hypoaspis simplexans (Womersley, 1956)
- Hypoaspis sinensis (Bai & Gu, 1993)
- Hypoaspis solimani Nawar, Shereef & Ahmed, 1993
- Hypoaspis sorecis Li, Zheng & Yang, 1996
- Hypoaspis spinacrassus Rosario, 1981
- Hypoaspis spinaperaffinis Ma & Cui, in Ma, Liu & Cui 2002
- Hypoaspis spiniseta Barilo, in Barylo 1991
- Hypoaspis stilosus (Canestrini, 1884)
- Hypoaspis subminor Gu & Bai, 1991
- Hypoaspis submontana Bai, Chen & Gu, 1994
- Hypoaspis subpictus Gu & Bai, 1992
- Hypoaspis sungaris Ma, 1996
- Hypoaspis surenai Joharchi & Shahedi, 2016
- Hypoaspis surigaoensis Rosario, 1981
- Hypoaspis tengi Gu & Bai, 1991
- Hypoaspis tenuisetus (Rosario, 1981)
- Hypoaspis terrestris Leonardi, 1899
- Hypoaspis terrestrisimilis Ma, Zhang & Li, 2003
- Hypoaspis tetraspinae Karg, 1995
- Hypoaspis thysanifer (Zeman, 1982)
- Hypoaspis transversanalis Karg, 2000
- Hypoaspis tribina Karg, 1979
- Hypoaspis tridentata Karg, 1979
- Hypoaspis tridentifera Karg, 1978
- Hypoaspis tripodiger Berlese, 1916
- Hypoaspis trispinosa Berlese, 1920
- Hypoaspis tuberculata Masan, 1992
- Hypoaspis ungeri Karg, 1985
- Hypoaspis vacuus (Michael, 1891)
- Hypoaspis vanmoli Loots, 1980
- Hypoaspis verticis Karg, 1978
- Hypoaspis vertisimilis Karg, 1994
- Hypoaspis wangae (Bai & Gu, 1993)
- Hypoaspis weni Bai, Chen & Gu, 1994
- Hypoaspis womersleyi Domrow, 1957
- Hypoaspis wufengensis Liu & Ma, 2003
- Hypoaspis xiajiangensis (Liu & Ma, 2000)
- Hypoaspis yamanchii Ishikawa, 1982
- Hypoaspis yeruiyuae (Ma, 1995)
- Hypoaspis zhongweiensis (Bai & Gu, 1993)
- Hypoaspis zhoumanshuae Ma-Liming, 1997
