= Turkel =

Turkel is a surname. Notable people with the surname include:

- Ann Turkel (born 1946), American actress and former model
- Bruce Turkel (born 1957), creative entrepreneur, speaker, and branding expert
- Eli Turkel, Israeli applied mathematician, Professor of Applied Mathematics at the School of Mathematical Sciences, Tel Aviv University
- Jacob Turkel (born 1935), Israeli judge, former Supreme Court of Israel Justice
- Joe Turkel (1927–2022), American character actor of film and television
- Nury Turkel (born 1970), Uyghur American attorney, public official and human rights advocate
- Roma Rudd Turkel (1906–1972)), American Catholic writer, lecturer

== See also ==
- Turkel Commission, an inquiry set up by Israeli Government to investigate the Gaza flotilla raid and the Blockade of Gaza
- Dorothy H. Turkel House, private residence in north-central Detroit, Michigan
- Turk (disambiguation)
- Turkhel
- Turkiella
