= Gigantolaelaps mattogrossensis =

Scientific classification
- Domain: Eukaryota
- Kingdom: Animalia
- Phylum: Arthropoda
- Subphylum: Chelicerata
- Class: Arachnida
- Order: Mesostigmata
- Family: Laelapidae
- Genus: Gigantolaelaps
- Species: G. mattogrossensis

Binomial name
- Gigantolaelaps mattogrossensis (Fonseca, 1935)

Synonyms
- Macrolaelaps mattogrossensis Fonseca, 1935; Gigantolaelaps mattogrossensis Fonseca, 1939; Gigantolaelaps cricetidarum Morlan, 1951

Species of mite

Gigantolaelaps mattogrossensis is a mite from the Americas. It has been found on the marsh rice rat (Oryzomys palustris), hispid cotton rat (Sigmodon hispidus), black rat (Rattus rattus), brown rat (Rattus norvegicus), and white-footed mouse (Peromyscus leucopus) in the United States (Florida, Georgia, South Carolina, and Texas). In Venezuela, it has been recorded from Holochilus brasiliensis, Sigmodon hirsutus, and Marmosa robinsoni. In Argentina, it has been found on Scapteromys aquaticus, Oligoryzomys flavescens, and Holochilus brasiliensis. The North American form was first described as a separate species, Gigantolaelaps cricetidarum, and is still occasionally considered as such.

== Literature cited ==
- Carmichael, Joseph A.; Strauss, Richard E.; Mcintyre, Nancy E. (2007). "Seasonal Variation of North American Form of Gigantolaelaps mattogrossensis (Acari: Laelapidae) on Marsh Rice Rat in Southern Coastal Texas". Journal of Medical Entomology. 44 (1): 80–84. doi:10.1603/0022-2585(2007)44[80:SVONAF]2.0.CO;2. PMID 17294924. S2CID 15349741.
- da Fonseca, Flavio (1936). "Notas de acareologia XVIII. Generos e especies de acarianos parasitas de ratos (Acari, Laelaptidae)". Memórias do Instituto Butantan. 10: 17–23.
- da Fonseca, Flavio (1939). "Acarological Notes XXV. The giant Laelaptidae, parasites of South American Rodents. New genus and species". Memórias do Instituto Butantan. 12: 57–102. Available at the Internet Archive.
- Furman, Deane P. (1972). "Mites of the family Laelapidae in Venezuela (Acarina: Laelapidae)". Brigham Young University Science Bulletin. Biological Series. 17 (3): 12.
- Morlan, Harvey B. (1951). "Notes on the Genus Gigantolaelaps and Description of a New Species, Gigantolaelaps cricetidarum (Acarina: Laelaptidae)". The Journal of Parasitology. 37 (3): 273–279. doi:10.2307/3273199. JSTOR 3273199. PMID 14851152.
- Nava, Santiago; Lareschi, Marcela; Voglino, Damián (2003). "Interrelationship between ectoparasites and wild rodents from northeastern Buenos Aires province, Argentina". Memórias do Instituto Oswaldo Cruz. 98 (1): 45–49. doi:10.1590/S0074-02762003000100007. hdl:1807/8021. PMID 12700861.
- Whitaker, John O.; Wilson, Nixon (1974). "Host and Distribution Lists of Mites (Acari), Parasitic and Phoretic, in the Hair of Wild Mammals of North America, North of Mexico". American Midland Naturalist. 91 (1): 1–67. doi:10.2307/2424511. JSTOR 2424511.
- Whitaker Jr., John O.; Walters, Brianne L.; Castor, Linda K.; Ritzi, Christopher M.; Wilson, Nixon (2007). "Host and distribution lists of mites (Acari), parasitic and phoretic, in the hair or on the skin of North American wild mammals north of Mexico: records since 1974". Faculty Publications from the Harold W. Manter Laboratory of Parasitology. 1: 1–173.
