= Hypoaspis collina =

Scientific classification
- Domain: Eukaryota
- Kingdom: Animalia
- Phylum: Arthropoda
- Subphylum: Chelicerata
- Class: Arachnida
- Order: Mesostigmata
- Family: Laelapidae
- Genus: Hypoaspis
- Species: H. collina

Binomial name
- Hypoaspis collina Huhta & Karg, 2010

Species of mite

Hypoaspis collina is a species of mite which was first described by Veikko Huhta and Wolfgang Karg in 2010, in Finland.
