= Eubrachylaelaps =

Scientific classification
- Kingdom: Animalia
- Phylum: Arthropoda
- Subphylum: Chelicerata
- Class: Arachnida
- Order: Mesostigmata
- Family: Laelapidae
- Genus: Eubrachylaelaps; Ewing, 1929

Genus of mites

Eubrachylaelaps is a genus of mites in the family Laelapidae.

== Species ==
- Eubrachylaelaps debilis
- Eubrachylaelaps hollisteri (Ewing, 1925)
- Eubrachylaelaps martini Jameson, 1951
