= Apsteiniella =

Scientific classification
- Kingdom: Animalia
- Phylum: Arthropoda
- Clade: Pancrustacea
- Class: Insecta
- Order: Coleoptera
- Suborder: Polyphaga
- Infraorder: Scarabaeiformia
- Family: Scarabaeidae
- Subfamily: Aphodiinae
- Tribe: Aphodiini
- Genus: Apsteiniella; Schmidt, 1917

Synonyms
- Jacobsonia Koshantschikov, 1912 (preocc. Jacobsonia); Yacobsonia Sharp, 1912

Genus of beetles

Apsteiniella is a genus of beetles of the family Scarabaeidae.

== Species ==
- Apsteiniella aralica (Nikolajev, 1979)
- Apsteiniella georgii (Koshantschikov, 1912)
- Apsteiniella naviauxi Baraud, 1977
