= Cyclolaelaps =

Scientific classification
- Kingdom: Animalia
- Phylum: Arthropoda
- Subphylum: Chelicerata
- Class: Arachnida
- Order: Mesostigmata
- Family: Laelapidae
- Genus: Cyclolaelaps; Ewing, 1933

Genus of mites

Cyclolaelaps is a genus of mites in the family Laelapidae.

== Species ==
- Cyclolaelaps circularis Ewing, 1933
