= Sphaeroseius ecitophilus =

Scientific classification
- Domain: Eukaryota
- Kingdom: Animalia
- Phylum: Arthropoda
- Subphylum: Chelicerata
- Class: Arachnida
- Order: Mesostigmata
- Family: Laelapidae
- Genus: Sphaeroseius
- Species: S. ecitophilus

Binomial name
- Sphaeroseius ecitophilus (Mello-Leitão, 1925)

Species of mite

Sphaeroseius ecitophilus is a South American species of mite.

Cândido Firmino de Mello-Leitão established the spider family Brucharachnidae in 1925 for the newly discovered genus and species from Córdoba, Argentina, Brucharachne ecitophila, based on a (purportedly) female specimen. He thought it the most curious spider he had ever seen. The "Brucharachnidae" were thought to be related to the spider family Oonopidae.

In 1995, Gerald W. Krantz and Norman I. Platnick re-examined the original specimen, and found it not to be a spider at all, but an extraordinary male mite that very much resembles a spider. He placed it under the existing myrmecophilous genus Sphaeroseius.

Mites of the genus Sphaeroseius have only been found in association with ecitonine army ants (Neivamyrmex, Labidus) in Brazil, Argentina, and possibly Costa Rica.

The species name ecitophilus means "Eciton-loving".
