= Dicrocheles phalaenodectes =

Scientific classification
- Kingdom: Animalia
- Phylum: Arthropoda
- Subphylum: Chelicerata
- Class: Arachnida
- Order: Mesostigmata
- Family: Laelapidae
- Genus: Dicrocheles
- Species: D. phalaenodectes

Binomial name
- Dicrocheles phalaenodectes (Treat, 1954)

Synonyms
- Myrmonyssus phalaenodectes Treat, 1954

Species of mite

Dicrocheles phalaenodectes is a parasitic mite which infests the ear of certain species of Noctuid moths. They are notable in that only one ear is ever colonised, leaving one intact so that the host is still able to detect the sound from hunting bats. This is taken to be an adaptation reducing the 'virulence' of the parasite to prevent its host's destruction, and therefore its own. The mechanism in which this is accomplished is with a pheromone trail around the uncolonized ear, which leads to the colonized ear. Once an ear is colonized, scouts are sent to the other ear periodically to see if there are any mites and lead any they find to the correct ear. This further refreshes the pheromone trail.
