= Echinolaelaps =

Scientific classification
- Kingdom: Animalia
- Phylum: Arthropoda
- Subphylum: Chelicerata
- Class: Arachnida
- Order: Mesostigmata
- Family: Laelapidae
- Genus: Echinolaelaps; Ewing, 1929

Genus of mites

Echinolaelaps is a genus of mites in the family Laelapidae.

== Species ==
- Echinolaelaps echidninus (Berlese, 1887)
- Echinolaelaps fukienensis
