= Geneiadolaelaps =

Scientific classification
- Kingdom: Animalia
- Phylum: Arthropoda
- Subphylum: Chelicerata
- Class: Arachnida
- Order: Mesostigmata
- Family: Laelapidae
- Genus: Geneiadolaelaps; Ewing, 1929

Genus of mites

Geneiadolaelaps is a genus of mites in the family Laelapidae.

== Species ==
- Geneiadolaelaps barbatus (Ewing, 1925)
