= Mellitus (disambiguation) =

Mellitus was the third Archbishop of Canterbury in the early 7th century AD.

Mellitus may also refer to:

- Diabetes mellitus, a metabolic disease
- Pachybrachis mellitus, a leaf-beetle species of Pachybrachis
- Neoporus mellitus, a predaceous water beetle in the family Dytiscidae
- Pyrophorus mellitus, a click beetle species of Pyrophorus
- Eumellitiphis mellitus, a bee mite in the family Laelapidae
