= Meliponapachys =

Scientific classification
- Kingdom: Animalia
- Phylum: Arthropoda
- Subphylum: Chelicerata
- Class: Arachnida
- Order: Mesostigmata
- Family: Laelapidae
- Genus: Meliponapachys; Turk, 1948

Genus of mites

Meliponapachys is a genus of mites in the family Laelapidae.

This genus was formerly in the family Pachylaelapidae.
