= Fritz Lukoschus =

German zoologist (1919-1987)

Fritz S. Lukoschus
- Born: 27 April 1919; Grabsten, Kreis Memel
- Died: 23 August 1987 (aged 68); Nijmegen
- Education: University of Göttingen
- Known for: Systematics and biology of Acari
- Spouse: Margarethe Lukoschus-Eichmann
- Children: 3
- Scientific career
- Fields: Acarology
- Workplaces: University of Göttingen, Catholic University of Nijmegen
- Thesis: (1946)

Fritz S. Lukoschus (1919–1987) was a German zoologist studying the systematics and biology of the Acari. Over the course of his career he published over 200 scientific articles, describing more than 90 species new for science. Lukoschus was born in April 1919 in Grabsten (Kreis Memel, present-day Lithuania) in April 1919. He obtained his PhD in 1946 from the University of Göttingen on a thesis on the development of castes in the European honey bee. After working at the University of Göttingen until 1953, he worked at several institutions before being recruited by the Catholic University of Nijmegen in 1962 where he stayed until his retirement in 1984. Lukoschus died suddenly in August 1987. The genera Lukoschus and Lukoschuscoptes (which was placed in the subfamily Lukoschuscoptinae) were named after him.
