= Cyclothorax =

Scientific classification
- Kingdom: Animalia
- Phylum: Arthropoda
- Subphylum: Chelicerata
- Class: Arachnida
- Order: Mesostigmata
- Family: Laelapidae
- Genus: Cyclothorax von Frauenfeld, 1868

Genus of mites

Cyclothorax is a genus of mites in the family Laelapidae.

== Species ==
- Cyclothorax carcinicola von Frauenfeld, 1868
