= Meliponaspis =

Scientific classification
- Kingdom: Animalia
- Phylum: Arthropoda
- Subphylum: Chelicerata
- Class: Arachnida
- Order: Mesostigmata
- Family: Laelapidae
- Genus: Meliponaspis; Vitzthum, 1930

Genus of mites

Meliponaspis is a genus of mites in the family Laelapidae.

== Species ==
- Meliponaspis debilipes Vitzthum, 1930
