= Halbertia =

Scientific classification
- Kingdom: Animalia
- Phylum: Arthropoda
- Subphylum: Chelicerata
- Class: Arachnida
- Order: Mesostigmata
- Family: Laelapidae
- Genus: Halbertia; Türk & Türk, 1952

Genus of mites

Halbertia is a genus of mites in the family Laelapidae.

== Species ==
- Halbertia oblongus (Halbert, 1915)
