= Chapalania =

Scientific classification
- Kingdom: Animalia
- Phylum: Arthropoda
- Subphylum: Chelicerata
- Class: Arachnida
- Order: Mesostigmata
- Family: Laelapidae
- Genus: Chapalania; Hoffmann & Lopez-Campos, 1995

Genus of mites

Chapalania is a genus of mites in the family Laelapidae.

== Species ==
- Chapalania cifuentesi Hoffmann & Lopez-Campos, 1995
