= Hunteracarus =

Scientific classification
- Kingdom: Animalia
- Phylum: Arthropoda
- Subphylum: Chelicerata
- Class: Arachnida
- Order: Mesostigmata
- Family: Laelapidae
- Genus: Hunteracarus; Costa, 1975

Genus of mites

Hunteracarus is a genus of mites in the family Laelapidae.

== Species ==
- Hunteracarus womersleyi Costa, 1975
