= Ichoronyssus =

Scientific classification
- Kingdom: Animalia
- Phylum: Arthropoda
- Subphylum: Chelicerata
- Class: Arachnida
- Order: Mesostigmata
- Family: Laelapidae
- Genus: Ichoronyssus; Kolenati, 1858

Genus of mites

Ichoronyssus is a genus of mites in the family Laelapidae.

== Species ==
- Ichoronyssus jacksoni Radford, 1940
- Ichoronyssus miniopterus (Womersley, 1957)
- Ichoronyssus scutatus (Kolenati, 1857)
- Ichoronyssus ventralis Wen Tin-Whan, 1975
