= Zontia =

Scientific classification
- Kingdom: Animalia
- Phylum: Arthropoda
- Subphylum: Chelicerata
- Class: Arachnida
- Order: Mesostigmata
- Family: Laelapidae
- Genus: Zontia; Türk, 1948

Genus of mites

Zontia is a genus of mites in the family Laelapidae.

== Species ==
- Zontia meliponensis Türk, 1948
