= Camerolaelaps =

Scientific classification
- Kingdom: Animalia
- Phylum: Arthropoda
- Subphylum: Chelicerata
- Class: Arachnida
- Order: Mesostigmata
- Family: Laelapidae
- Genus: Camerolaelaps; Fonseca, 1960

Genus of mites

Camerolaelaps is a genus of mites in the family Laelapidae.

== Species ==
- Camerolaelaps yaoundensis (Taufflieb & Mouchet, 1956)
