= Myrmosleichus =

Scientific classification
- Kingdom: Animalia
- Phylum: Arthropoda
- Subphylum: Chelicerata
- Class: Arachnida
- Order: Mesostigmata
- Family: Laelapidae
- Genus: Myrmosleichus; Berlese, 1903

Genus of mites

Myrmosleichus is a genus of mites in the family Laelapidae.

== Species ==
- Myrmosleichus coronatus (Berlese, 1903)
