= Gecarcinolaelaps =

Scientific classification
- Kingdom: Animalia
- Phylum: Arthropoda
- Subphylum: Chelicerata
- Class: Arachnida
- Order: Mesostigmata
- Family: Laelapidae
- Genus: Gecarcinolaelaps; Casanueva, 1993

Genus of arachnids

Gecarcinolaelaps is a genus of mites in the family Laelapidae.

== Species ==
- Gecarcinolaelaps cancer (Pearse, 1929)
