= Tricholaelaps =

Scientific classification
- Kingdom: Animalia
- Phylum: Arthropoda
- Subphylum: Chelicerata
- Class: Arachnida
- Order: Mesostigmata
- Family: Laelapidae
- Genus: Tricholaelaps; Vitzthum, 1926

Genus of mites

Tricholaelaps is a genus of mites in the family Laelapidae.

== Species ==
- Tricholaelaps comatus Vitzthum, 1926
- Tricholaelaps typhlomydis Gu & Shen, 1981
