= Longolaelaps =

Scientific classification
- Kingdom: Animalia
- Phylum: Arthropoda
- Subphylum: Chelicerata
- Class: Arachnida
- Order: Mesostigmata
- Family: Laelapidae
- Genus: Longolaelaps; Vitzthum, 1926

Genus of mites

Longolaelaps is a genus of mites in the family Laelapidae.

== Species ==
- Longolaelaps longulus Vitzthum, 1926
- Longolaelaps whartoni Drummond & Baker, 1960
