= Gigantolaelaps =

Scientific classification
- Kingdom: Animalia
- Phylum: Arthropoda
- Subphylum: Chelicerata
- Class: Arachnida
- Order: Mesostigmata
- Family: Laelapidae
- Genus: Gigantolaelaps; Fonseca, 1939

Species
- See text

Genus of mites

Gigantolaelaps is a genus of mites in the family Laelapidae. It is found in the fur of cricetid rodents, most often from the tribe Oryzomyini, from South America north to the southern United States. They are large (>1 mm) and darkly colored and have a complex life cycle.

== Species ==
- Gigantolaelaps aitkeni
- Gigantolaelaps amazonae
- Gigantolaelaps barrerai
- Gigantolaelaps boneti (from Peromyscus mexicanus, Handleyomys chapmani, Megadontomys cryophilus, Peromyscus melanocarpus, and Oryzomys couesi in Oaxaca; includes G. tropedai)
- Gigantolaelaps brachyspinosus (from Holochilus brasiliensis)
- Gigantolaelaps canestrinii
- Gigantolaelaps fonsecai (incertae sedis)
- Gigantolaelaps gilmorei
- Gigantolaelaps goyanensis (includes G. strandtmanni)
- Gigantolaelaps guimaraesi
- Gigantolaelaps inca
- Gigantolaelaps intermedia
- Gigantolaelaps mattogrossensis (includes G. cricetidarum)
- Gigantolaelaps maximus (incertae sedis)
- Gigantolaelaps oudemansi
- Gigantolaelaps peruviana
- Gigantolaelaps striatus
- Gigantolaelaps tiptoni
- Gigantolaelaps versteegi
- Gigantolaelaps vitzthumi (includes G. bahiensis and G. bipilosus)
- Gigantolaelaps wolffsohni Fonseca, 1939 (includes G. butantanensis and G. comatus)

== Literature cited ==
- Carmichael, J.A., Strauss, R.E. and McIntyre, N.E. 2007. Seasonal variation of North American form of Gigantolaelaps mattogrossensis (Acari: Laelapidae) on marsh rice rat in southern coastal Texas. Journal of Medical Entomology 44(1):80–84.
- Estébanes-González, M.L. and Cervantes, F.A. 2005. Mites and ticks associated with some small mammals in Mexico (subscription required). International Journal of Acarology 31(1):23–37.
- Furman, D.P. 1972. Laelapid mites (Laelapidae: Laelapinae) from Venezuela. Brigham Young University Science Bulletin 17(3):1–58.
