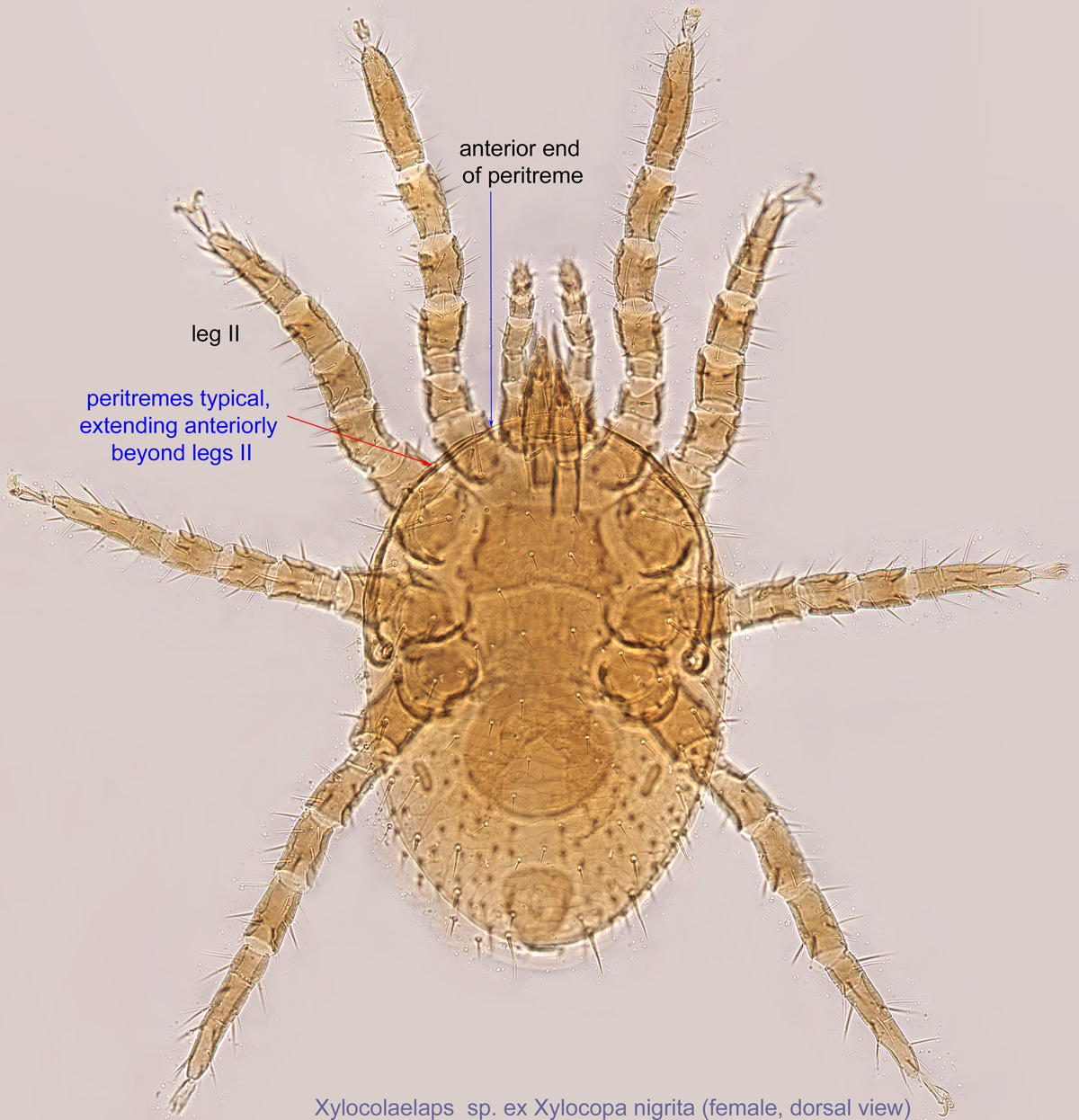

Scientific classification
- Domain: Eukaryota
- Kingdom: Animalia
- Phylum: Arthropoda
- Subphylum: Chelicerata
- Class: Arachnida
- Order: Mesostigmata
- Family: Laelapidae
- Genus: Xylocolaelaps; Royce & Krantz, 2003

= Xylocolaelaps =

Genus of mites

Xylocolaelaps is a genus of mites in the family Laelapidae.

== Species ==
- Xylocolaelaps burgetti Royce & Krantz, 2003
