= Tylolaelaps =

Scientific classification
- Kingdom: Animalia
- Phylum: Arthropoda
- Subphylum: Chelicerata
- Class: Arachnida
- Order: Mesostigmata
- Family: Laelapidae
- Genus: Tylolaelaps; Y. M. Gu & C. S. Wang, 1979

Genus of mites

Tylolaelaps is a genus of mites in the family Laelapidae.

== Species ==
- Tylolaelaps rhizomydis Y. M. Gu & C. S. Wang, 1979
