= Tengilaelaps =

Scientific classification
- Kingdom: Animalia
- Phylum: Arthropoda
- Subphylum: Chelicerata
- Class: Arachnida
- Order: Mesostigmata
- Family: Laelapidae
- Genus: Tengilaelaps; Gu & Wang, 1996

Genus of mites

Tengilaelaps is a genus of mites in the family Laelapidae.

== Species ==
- Tengilaelaps cerambycius Gu & Wang, 1996
