= Hunteria brasilinesis =

Scientific classification
- Kingdom: Animalia
- Phylum: Arthropoda
- Subphylum: Chelicerata
- Class: Arachnida
- Order: Mesostigmata
- Family: Laelapidae
- Genus: Hunteria; M. Delfinado-Baker, E. W. Baker & C. H. W. Flechtmann, 1984
- Species: H. brasilinesis

Binomial name
- Hunteria brasilinesis M. Delfinado-Baker, E. W. Baker & C. H. W. Flechtmann, 1984

Genus of mites

Hunteria is a monotypic genus of mites in the family Laelapidae. The only species is Hunteria brasilinesis.
