= Pseudolaelaps =

Scientific classification
- Kingdom: Animalia
- Phylum: Arthropoda
- Subphylum: Chelicerata
- Class: Arachnida
- Order: Mesostigmata
- Family: Laelapidae
- Genus: Pseudolaelaps; Berlese, 1916

Genus of mites

Pseudolaelaps is a genus of mites in the family Laelapidae.

== Species ==
- Pseudolaelaps doderoi (Berlese, 1910)
- Pseudolaelaps gamaselloides Berlese, 1920
- Pseudolaelaps paulseni (Berlese, 1910)
