= Sinolaelaps =

Scientific classification
- Kingdom: Animalia
- Phylum: Arthropoda
- Subphylum: Chelicerata
- Class: Arachnida
- Order: Mesostigmata
- Family: Laelapidae
- Genus: Sinolaelaps; Y. M. Gu & C. S. Wang, 1979

Genus of mites

Sinolaelaps is a genus of mites in the family Laelapidae.

== Species ==
- Sinolaelaps liui Liu & Wang, 1997
- Sinolaelaps typhlomydis Y. M. Gu & C. S. Wang, 1979
- Sinolaelaps wuyiensis Wang, 1982
- Sinolaelaps yunnanensis Tian, 1988
