= Berlesia =

Scientific classification
- Kingdom: Animalia
- Phylum: Arthropoda
- Subphylum: Chelicerata
- Class: Arachnida
- Order: Mesostigmata
- Family: Laelapidae
- Genus: Berlesia; G.Canestrini, 1884

Genus of mites

Berlesia is a genus of mites in the family Laelapidae.

== Species ==
- Berlesia rapax G.Canestrini, 1884
