= Stevelus =

Scientific classification
- Kingdom: Animalia
- Phylum: Arthropoda
- Subphylum: Chelicerata
- Class: Arachnida
- Order: Mesostigmata
- Family: Laelapidae
- Genus: Stevelus; Hunter, 1963

Genus of mites

Stevelus is a genus of mites in the family Laelapidae.

== Species ==
- Stevelus amiculus Hunter, 1963
