= Sternolaelaps =

Scientific classification
- Kingdom: Animalia
- Phylum: Arthropoda
- Subphylum: Chelicerata
- Class: Arachnida
- Order: Mesostigmata
- Family: Laelapidae
- Genus: Sternolaelaps; Zumpt & Patterson, 1951

Genus of mites

Sternolaelaps is a genus of mites in the family Laelapidae.

== Species ==
- Sternolaelaps utahensis (Ewing, 1933)
