= Radfordilaelaps =

Scientific classification
- Kingdom: Animalia
- Phylum: Arthropoda
- Subphylum: Chelicerata
- Class: Arachnida
- Order: Mesostigmata
- Family: Laelapidae
- Genus: Radfordilaelaps; Zumpt, 1949

Genus of mites

Radfordilaelaps is a genus of mites in the family Laelapidae.

== Species ==
- Radfordilaelaps meridionalis Zumpt, 1949
