= Myonyssus =

Scientific classification
- Kingdom: Animalia
- Phylum: Arthropoda
- Subphylum: Chelicerata
- Class: Arachnida
- Order: Mesostigmata
- Family: Laelapidae
- Genus: Myonyssus; Tiraboschi, 1904

Genus of mites

Myonyssus is a genus of mites in the family Laelapidae.

== Species ==
- Myonyssus decumanus Tiraboschi, 1904
- Myonyssus gigas Oudemans, 1912
- Myonyssus rossicus Bregetova, 1956
- Myonyssus ingricus Bregetova, 1956
