= Rhyzolaelaps =

Scientific classification
- Kingdom: Animalia
- Phylum: Arthropoda
- Subphylum: Chelicerata
- Class: Arachnida
- Order: Mesostigmata
- Family: Laelapidae
- Genus: Rhyzolaelaps; Bregetova & Grokhovskaya, 1961

Genus of mites

Rhyzolaelaps is a genus of mites in the family Laelapidae.

== Species ==
- Rhyzolaelaps inaequipilis Bregetova & Grokhovskaya, 1961
- Rhyzolaelaps lodianensis Gu & Wang, 1979
- Rhyzolaelaps rhizomydis Wang, Liao & Lin, 1980
- Rhyzolaelaps sinoamericanus Gu, Whitaker & Baccus, 1990
