= Neospinolaelaps =

Scientific classification
- Kingdom: Animalia
- Phylum: Arthropoda
- Subphylum: Chelicerata
- Class: Arachnida
- Order: Mesostigmata
- Family: Laelapidae
- Genus: Neospinolaelaps; Zumpt & Patterson, 1952

Genus of mites

Neospinolaelaps is a genus of mites in the family Laelapidae.

== Species ==
- Neospinolaelaps miniopteri Zumpt & Patterson, 1952
