= Qinghailaelaps =

Scientific classification
- Domain: Eukaryota
- Kingdom: Animalia
- Phylum: Arthropoda
- Subphylum: Chelicerata
- Class: Arachnida
- Order: Mesostigmata
- Family: Laelapidae
- Genus: Qinghailaelaps; Y. M. Gu & X. Z. Yang, 1984

Genus of mites

Qinghailaelaps is a genus of mites in the family Laelapidae.

== Species ==
- Qinghailaelaps cavicolous Gu, Liu & Niu, 1997.
- Qinghailaelaps gui Bai, 1992.
- Qinghailaelaps marmotae Y. M. Gu & X. Z. Yang, 1984.
- Qinghailaelaps qinghaiensis Li-Chao, Yang-Xizheng & Wang-Guol Li, 1998.
