= Rhinolaelaps =

Scientific classification
- Kingdom: Animalia
- Phylum: Arthropoda
- Subphylum: Chelicerata
- Class: Arachnida
- Order: Mesostigmata
- Family: Laelapidae
- Genus: Rhinolaelaps; Fonseca, 1960

Genus of mites

Rhinolaelaps is a genus of mites in the family Laelapidae.

== Species ==
- Rhinolaelaps vitzthumio (Fonseca, 1935)
