= Parabisternalis =

Scientific classification
- Kingdom: Animalia
- Phylum: Arthropoda
- Subphylum: Chelicerata
- Class: Arachnida
- Order: Mesostigmata
- Family: Laelapidae
- Genus: Parabisternalis; Ueckermann & Loots, 1995

Genus of mites

Parabisternalis is a genus of mites in the family Laelapidae.

== Species ==
- Parabisternalis yemeni Ueckermann & Loots, 1995
