= Iphiopsis =

Scientific classification
- Kingdom: Animalia
- Phylum: Arthropoda
- Subphylum: Chelicerata
- Class: Arachnida
- Order: Mesostigmata
- Family: Laelapidae
- Genus: Iphiopsis; Berlese, 1882

Genus of mites

Iphiopsis is a genus of mites in the family Laelapidae.

== Species ==
- Iphiopsis mirabilis (Berlese, 1882)
