= Scissuralaelaps =

Scientific classification
- Kingdom: Animalia
- Phylum: Arthropoda
- Subphylum: Chelicerata
- Class: Arachnida
- Order: Mesostigmata
- Family: Laelapidae
- Genus: Scissuralaelaps; Womersley, 1945

Genus of mites

Scissuralaelaps is a genus of mites in the family Laelapidae.

== Species ==
- Scissuralaelaps bipartitus Ishikawa, 1988
- Scissuralaelaps breviseta Ishikawa, 1988
- Scissuralaelaps grootaerti Fain, 1992
- Scissuralaelaps hirschmanni Fain, 1992
- Scissuralaelaps huberi Seeman & Alberti, 2015
- Scissuralaelaps innotensis Halliday, 1993
- Scissuralaelaps irianensis Fain, 1992
- Scissuralaelaps joliveti Fain, 1992
- Scissuralaelaps novaguinea Womersley, 1945
- Scissuralaelaps philippinensis Rosario, 1981
- Scissuralaelaps queenslandica Womersley, 1945
