= Cerambylaelaps =

Scientific classification
- Kingdom: Animalia
- Phylum: Arthropoda
- Subphylum: Chelicerata
- Class: Arachnida
- Order: Mesostigmata
- Family: Laelapidae
- Genus: Cerambylaelaps; M.Costa, 1979

Genus of mites

Cerambylaelaps is a genus of mites in the family Laelapidae.

== Species ==
- Cerambylaelaps nadchatrami M.Costa, 1979
