= Hyletastes =

Scientific classification
- Kingdom: Animalia
- Phylum: Arthropoda
- Subphylum: Chelicerata
- Class: Arachnida
- Order: Mesostigmata
- Family: Laelapidae
- Genus: Hyletastes; Gistel, 1848

Genus of mites

Hyletastes is a genus of mites in the family Laelapidae.

== Species ==
- Hyletastes globulus (C.L.Koch, 1939)
