= Pneumolaelaps =

Scientific classification
- Kingdom: Animalia
- Phylum: Arthropoda
- Subphylum: Chelicerata
- Class: Arachnida
- Order: Mesostigmata
- Family: Laelapidae
- Genus: Pneumolaelaps; Berlese, 1920

Genus of mites

Pneumolaelaps is a genus of mites in the family Laelapidae.

== Selected species ==
- Pneumolaelaps arctos (Karg, 1984)
- Pneumolaelaps asperatus (Berlese, 1904)
- Pneumolaelaps baywangus Rosario, 1981
- Pneumolaelaps bombicolens G.Canestrini, 1885
- Pneumolaelaps breviseta (Evans & Till, 1966)
- Pneumolaelaps cavitatis (Karg, 1982)
- Pneumolaelaps eulinguae (Karg, 2003)
- Pneumolaelaps gigantis (Karg, 1982)
- Pneumolaelaps hyatti (Evans & Till, 1966)
- Pneumolaelaps kaibaeus Rosario, 1981
- Pneumolaelaps karawaiewi (Berlese, 1904)
- Pneumolaelaps lubricus Voigts & Oudemans, 1904
- Pneumolaelaps montanus (Berlese, 1904)
- Pneumolaelaps niutirani Fan & Zhang, 2016
