= Apsteiniella georgii =

Scientific classification
- Kingdom: Animalia
- Phylum: Arthropoda
- Clade: Pancrustacea
- Class: Insecta
- Order: Coleoptera
- Suborder: Polyphaga
- Infraorder: Scarabaeiformia
- Family: Scarabaeidae
- Genus: Apsteiniella
- Species: A. georgii

Binomial name
- Apsteiniella georgii (Koshantschikov, 1912)

Synonyms
- Jacobsonia georgii Koshantschikov, 1912

Species of beetle

Apsteiniella georgii is a species of beetle of the family Scarabaeidae. It is found in Turkmenistan.

== Description ==
Adults reach a length of about 5–7 mm (0.20–0.28 in). They have an elongate-oval, convex, shiny, glabrous, light or dark testaceous body.
