= Conolaelaps =

Scientific classification
- Kingdom: Animalia
- Phylum: Arthropoda
- Subphylum: Chelicerata
- Class: Arachnida
- Order: Mesostigmata
- Family: Laelapidae
- Genus: Conolaelaps; Womersley, 1959

Genus of mites

Conolaelaps is a genus of mites in the family Laelapidae.

== Species ==
- Conolaelaps coniferus (Canestrini, 1884)
