= Melittiphis =

Scientific classification
- Kingdom: Animalia
- Phylum: Arthropoda
- Subphylum: Chelicerata
- Class: Arachnida
- Order: Mesostigmata
- Family: Laelapidae
- Genus: Melittiphis; Berlese, 1918

Genus of mites

Melittiphis is a genus of mites in the family Laelapidae.

== Species ==
- Melittiphis alvearius (Berlese, 1895)
