= Hymenolaelaps =

Scientific classification
- Kingdom: Animalia
- Phylum: Arthropoda
- Subphylum: Chelicerata
- Class: Arachnida
- Order: Mesostigmata
- Family: Laelapidae
- Genus: Hymenolaelaps; Furman, 1972

Genus of mites

Hymenolaelaps is a genus of mites in the family Laelapidae.

== Species ==
- Hymenolaelaps amphibius (Zakhvatkin, 1948)
- Hymenolaelaps princeps Furman, 1972
