= Chrysochlorolaelaps =

Scientific classification
- Kingdom: Animalia
- Phylum: Arthropoda
- Subphylum: Chelicerata
- Class: Arachnida
- Order: Mesostigmata
- Family: Laelapidae
- Genus: Chrysochlorolaelaps; Evans & Till, 1966

Genus of mites

Chrysochlorolaelaps is a genus of mites in the family Laelapidae.

== Species ==
- Chrysochlorolaelaps benoiti Evans & Till, 1966
