= Podolaelaps =

Scientific classification
- Kingdom: Animalia
- Phylum: Arthropoda
- Subphylum: Chelicerata
- Class: Arachnida
- Order: Mesostigmata
- Family: Laelapidae
- Genus: Podolaelaps; Berlese, 1888

Genus of mites

Podolaelaps is a genus of mites in the family Laelapidae.

== Species ==
- Podolaelaps ambulacrus Berlese, 1888
