= Aetholaelaps =

Scientific classification
- Kingdom: Animalia
- Phylum: Arthropoda
- Subphylum: Chelicerata
- Class: Arachnida
- Order: Mesostigmata
- Family: Laelapidae
- Genus: Aetholaelaps; Strandtmann & Camin, 1956

Genus of mites

Aetholaelaps is a genus of mites in the family Laelapidae.

== Species ==
- Aetholaelaps sylstrai Strandtmann & Camin, 1956
- Aetholaelaps trilyssa Domrow & Taufflieb, 1963
