= Chalaza (mite) =

Scientific classification
- Kingdom: Animalia
- Phylum: Arthropoda
- Subphylum: Chelicerata
- Class: Arachnida
- Order: Mesostigmata
- Family: Laelapidae
- Genus: Chalaza; R. Domrow, 1990

Genus of mites

Chalaza is a genus of mites in the family Laelapidae.

== Species ==
- Chalaza novena R. Domrow, 1990
