= Chirolaelaps =

Scientific classification
- Kingdom: Animalia
- Phylum: Arthropoda
- Subphylum: Chelicerata
- Class: Arachnida
- Order: Mesostigmata
- Family: Laelapidae
- Genus: Chirolaelaps; A. C. G. Heath, D. M. Bishop & M. J. Daniel, 1987

Genus of mites

Chirolaelaps is a genus of mites in the family Laelapidae.

== Species ==
- Chirolaelaps mystacinae A. C. G. Heath, D. M. Bishop & M. J. Daniel, 1987
