= Neoberlesia =

Scientific classification
- Kingdom: Animalia
- Phylum: Arthropoda
- Subphylum: Chelicerata
- Class: Arachnida
- Order: Mesostigmata
- Family: Laelapidae
- Genus: Neoberlesia; Berlese, 1892

Genus of mites

Neoberlesia is a genus of mites in the family Laelapidae.

== Species ==
- Neoberlesia equitans Berlese, 1892
