= Dyscinetonyssus =

Scientific classification
- Kingdom: Animalia
- Phylum: Arthropoda
- Subphylum: Chelicerata
- Class: Arachnida
- Order: Mesostigmata
- Family: Laelapidae
- Genus: Dyscinetonyssus; Moss & Funk, 1965

Genus of mites

Dyscinetonyssus is a genus of mites in the family Laelapidae.

== Species ==
- Dyscinetonyssus hystricosus Moss & Funk, 1965
