= Lukoschus =

Scientific classification
- Kingdom: Animalia
- Phylum: Arthropoda
- Subphylum: Chelicerata
- Class: Arachnida
- Order: Mesostigmata
- Family: Laelapidae
- Genus: Lukoschus; Radovsky & Gettinger, 1999

Genus of mites

Lukoschus is a genus of mites in the family Laelapidae that was named after the German acarologist Fritz Lukoschus.

== Species ==
- Lukoschus maresi Radovsky & Gettinger, 1999
