= Dipolaelaps =

Scientific classification
- Kingdom: Animalia
- Phylum: Arthropoda
- Subphylum: Chelicerata
- Class: Arachnida
- Order: Mesostigmata
- Family: Laelapidae
- Genus: Dipolaelaps; Zemskaya & Piontkovskaya, 1960

Genus of mites

Dipolaelaps is a genus of mites in the family Laelapidae.

== Species ==
- Dipolaelaps chimmarogalis Gu, 1983
- Dipolaelaps histis Zhang-Youzhi, Deng-Chenyu, Xue-Qunli, Yu-Yongfang & Wang-Dunqin, 1998
- Dipolaelaps hoi Chang & Hsu
- Dipolaelaps jiangkouensis Gu, 1985
- Dipolaelaps longisetosus Huang, 1985
- Dipolaelaps nepalensis Till, 1988
- Dipolaelaps paraubsunaris Wang & Li, 2002
- Dipolaelaps soriculi Huang, 1985
- Dipolaelaps taibaiensis Huang, 1985
- Dipolaelaps ubsunuris Zemskaya & Piontkovskaya, 1960
