= Ondatralaelaps =

Scientific classification
- Kingdom: Animalia
- Phylum: Arthropoda
- Subphylum: Chelicerata
- Class: Arachnida
- Order: Mesostigmata
- Family: Laelapidae
- Genus: Ondatralaelaps; Evans & Till, 1965

Genus of mites

Ondatralaelaps is a genus of mites in the family Laelapidae.

== Species ==
- Ondatralaelaps multispinosus (Banks)
