= Julolaelaps =

Scientific classification
- Kingdom: Animalia
- Phylum: Arthropoda
- Subphylum: Chelicerata
- Class: Arachnida
- Order: Mesostigmata
- Family: Laelapidae
- Genus: Julolaelaps; Berlese, 1916

Genus of mites

Julolaelaps is a genus of mites in the family Laelapidae.

== Species ==
- Julolaelaps buensis Maes, 1983
- Julolaelaps cameroonensis Maes, 1983
- Julolaelaps dispar Berlese, 1916
- Julolaelaps excavatus Fain, 1987
- Julolaelaps idjwiensis Fain, 1987
- Julolaelaps madiakokoensis Fain, 1987
- Julolaelaps moseri Hunter & Rosario, 1986
- Julolaelaps paucipilis Fain, 1987
- Julolaelaps serratus Maes, 1983
- Julolaelaps vandaelensis Maes, 1983
