= Ljunghia =

Scientific classification
- Kingdom: Animalia
- Phylum: Arthropoda
- Subphylum: Chelicerata
- Class: Arachnida
- Order: Mesostigmata
- Family: Laelapidae
- Genus: Ljunghia; Oudemans, 1932

Genus of mites

Ljunghia is a genus of mites in the family Laelapidae.

== Species ==
- Ljunghia africana Fain, 1991
- Ljunghia bristowi (Finnegan)
- Ljunghia hoggi Domrow, 1975
- Ljunghia minor Fain, 1989
- Ljunghia novaecaledoniae Fain, 1991
- Ljunghia pulleinei Womersley, 1956
- Ljunghia rainbowi Domrow, 1975
- Ljunghia selenocosmiae Oudemans, 1932
