= Myrmeciphis =

Scientific classification
- Kingdom: Animalia
- Phylum: Arthropoda
- Subphylum: Chelicerata
- Class: Arachnida
- Order: Mesostigmata
- Family: Laelapidae
- Genus: Myrmeciphis; Hull, 1923

Genus of mites

Myrmeciphis is a genus of mites in the family Laelapidae.

== Species ==
- Myrmeciphis crawleianus Hull, 1923
