= Garmania =

Scientific classification
- Kingdom: Animalia
- Phylum: Arthropoda
- Subphylum: Chelicerata
- Class: Arachnida
- Order: Mesostigmata
- Family: Laelapidae
- Genus: Garmania; Nesbitt, 1951

Genus of mites

Garmania is a genus of mites in the family Laelapidae.

They are typically found in Europe.

== Species ==
- Garmania bombophila (Westerboer, 1963)
- Garmania caucasica (Byglarov, 1973)
- Garmania domesticus (Oudemans, 1929)
- Garmania mali (Oudemans, 1929)
