= Austrolaelaps =

Scientific classification
- Kingdom: Animalia
- Phylum: Arthropoda
- Subphylum: Chelicerata
- Class: Arachnida
- Order: Mesostigmata
- Family: Laelapidae
- Genus: Austrolaelaps; Womersley, 1956

Genus of mites

Austrolaelaps is a genus of mites in the family Laelapidae.

== Species ==
- Austrolaelaps mitchelli Womersley, 1956
