= Echinonyssus =

Scientific classification
- Kingdom: Animalia
- Phylum: Arthropoda
- Subphylum: Chelicerata
- Class: Arachnida
- Order: Mesostigmata
- Family: Laelapidae
- Genus: Echinonyssus; Hirst, 1925

Genus of mites

Echinonyssus is a genus of mites in the family Laelapidae.

== Species ==
- Echinonyssus alvarezi (Bassols, Quintero, Moreno & Vessi, 1991)
- Echinonyssus apoensis (Delfinado, 1960)
- Echinonyssus blanchardi (Trouessart, 1904)
- Echinonyssus confucianus (Hirst, 1921)
- Echinonyssus creightoni (Hirst, 1912)
- Echinonyssus distinctitarsus Tenorio & Radovsky, 1979
- Echinonyssus eileenae Tenorio, 1981
- Echinonyssus galiciae Fain & Pereira-Lorenzo, 1993
- Echinonyssus harpagonis Tenorio & Radovsky, 1979
- Echinonyssus isabelae Estebanes-Gonzalez & Smiley, 1997
- Echinonyssus liberiensis (Hirst, 1912)
- Echinonyssus lukoschusi Tenorio & Radovsky, 1979
- Echinonyssus melogalius Gu, Wang & Yuan, 1987
- Echinonyssus molinae Fain & Rack, 1990
- Echinonyssus nasutus Hirst, 1925
- Echinonyssus palawanensis (Delfinado, 1960)
- Echinonyssus soricis (Turk, 1945)
- Echinonyssus talpae (Zemskaya, 1955)
- Echinonyssus teresae Estebanes-Gonzalez & Smiley, 1997
- Echinonyssus umbonatus Tenorio & Radovsky, 1979
