= Bewsiella =

Scientific classification
- Kingdom: Animalia
- Phylum: Arthropoda
- Subphylum: Chelicerata
- Class: Arachnida
- Order: Mesostigmata
- Family: Laelapidae
- Genus: Bewsiella; Domrow, 1958

Genus of mites

Bewsiella is a genus of mites in the family Laelapidae.

== Species ==
- Bewsiella aelleni (Till, 1958)
- Bewsiella cloeotis Uchikawa, 1993
- Bewsiella coelopos Uchikawa, 1993
- Bewsiella emballonuris Uchikawa, 1993
- Bewsiella fledermaus Domrow, 1958
- Bewsiella haradai Uchikawa, 1993
- Bewsiella nycteris Uchikawa, 1993
