= Cavilaelaps =

Scientific classification
- Kingdom: Animalia
- Phylum: Arthropoda
- Subphylum: Chelicerata
- Class: Arachnida
- Order: Mesostigmata
- Family: Laelapidae
- Genus: Cavilaelaps; Fonseca, 1935

Genus of mites

Cavilaelaps is a genus of mites in the family Laelapidae.

== Species ==
- Cavilaelaps breslaui Fonseca, 1935
