= Steptolaelaps =

Scientific classification
- Kingdom: Animalia
- Phylum: Arthropoda
- Subphylum: Chelicerata
- Class: Arachnida
- Order: Mesostigmata
- Family: Laelapidae
- Genus: Steptolaelaps; Furman, 1955

Genus of mites

Steptolaelaps is a genus of mites in the family Laelapidae.

== Species ==
- Steptolaelaps heteromydis Furman, 1955
