= Praeparasitus =

Scientific classification
- Kingdom: Animalia
- Phylum: Arthropoda
- Subphylum: Chelicerata
- Class: Arachnida
- Order: Mesostigmata
- Family: Laelapidae
- Genus: Praeparasitus; Berlese, 1916

Genus of mites

Praeparasitus is a genus of mites in the family Laelapidae.

== Species ==
- Praeparasitus collaris (Berlese, 1916)
