= Narceolaelaps =

Scientific classification
- Kingdom: Animalia
- Phylum: Arthropoda
- Subphylum: Chelicerata
- Class: Arachnida
- Order: Mesostigmata
- Family: Laelapidae
- Genus: Narceolaelaps; J. B. Kethley, 1978

Genus of mites

Narceolaelaps is a genus of mites in the family Laelapidae.

== Species ==
- Narceolaelaps americanus Kethley, 1978
- Narceolaelaps annularis J. B. Kethley, 1978
- Narceolaelaps burdicki Kethley, 1978
- Narceolaelaps gordanus Kethley, 1978
