= Donia (mite) =

Scientific classification
- Kingdom: Animalia
- Phylum: Arthropoda
- Subphylum: Chelicerata
- Class: Arachnida
- Order: Mesostigmata
- Family: Laelapidae
- Genus: Donia; Oudemans, 1939

Genus of mites

Donia is a genus of mites in the family Laelapidae.

== Species ==
- Donia gehennalis (Oudemans, 1916)
