= Sphaeroseius =

Scientific classification
- Domain: Eukaryota
- Kingdom: Animalia
- Phylum: Arthropoda
- Subphylum: Chelicerata
- Class: Arachnida
- Order: Mesostigmata
- Family: Laelapidae
- Subfamily: Hypoaspidinae
- Genus: Sphaeroseius; Berlese, 1904

Genus of mites

Sphaeroseius is a genus of mites in the family Laelapidae.

== Species ==
- Sphaeroseius ecitonis (Wasmann, 1901)
- Sphaeroseius ecitophilus (Mello-Leitão, 1925)
