= Phytojacobsonia =

Scientific classification
- Kingdom: Animalia
- Phylum: Arthropoda
- Subphylum: Chelicerata
- Class: Arachnida
- Order: Mesostigmata
- Family: Laelapidae
- Genus: Phytojacobsonia; Vitzthum, 1925

Genus of mites

Phytojacobsonia is a genus of mites in the family Laelapidae.

== Species ==
- Phytojacobsonia irregularis Vitzthum, 1925
