= Nakhoda =

Scientific classification
- Kingdom: Animalia
- Phylum: Arthropoda
- Subphylum: Chelicerata
- Class: Arachnida
- Order: Mesostigmata
- Family: Laelapidae
- Genus: Nakhoda; Domrow & Nadchatram, 1975

Genus of mites

Nakhoda is a genus of mites in the family Laelapidae.

== Species ==
- Nakhoda linearis Domrow & Nadchatram, 1975
