= Urozercon =

Scientific classification
- Kingdom: Animalia
- Phylum: Arthropoda
- Subphylum: Chelicerata
- Class: Arachnida
- Order: Mesostigmata
- Family: Laelapidae
- Genus: Urozercon; Berlese, 1901

Genus of mites

Urozercon is a genus of mites in the family Laelapidae.

== Species ==
- Urozercon ishiharai (Kurosa, 1994)
- Urozercon paradoxus Berlese, 1901
