= Cosmiphis =

Scientific classification
- Kingdom: Animalia
- Phylum: Arthropoda
- Subphylum: Chelicerata
- Class: Arachnida
- Order: Mesostigmata
- Family: Laelapidae
- Genus: Cosmiphis; Vitzthum, 1926

Genus of mites

Cosmiphis is a genus of mites in the family Laelapidae, containing only Cosmiphis bosschai (Oudemans, 1901).
