= Gammaridacarus =

Scientific classification
- Kingdom: Animalia
- Phylum: Arthropoda
- Subphylum: Chelicerata
- Class: Arachnida
- Order: Mesostigmata
- Family: Laelapidae
- Genus: Gammaridacarus; Canaris, 1962

Genus of mites

Gammaridacarus is a genus of mites in the family Laelapidae.

== Species ==
- Gammaridacarus brevisternalis Canaris, 1962
