= Myrmozercon =

Myrmozercon Temporal range: Palaeogene–present

Scientific classification
- Kingdom: Animalia
- Phylum: Arthropoda
- Subphylum: Chelicerata
- Class: Arachnida
- Order: Mesostigmata
- Family: Laelapidae
- Genus: Myrmozercon; Berlese, 1902

Type species
- Myrmozercon brevipes Berlese, 1902

Synonyms
- Myrmonyssus Berlese, 1903; Parabisternalis Ueckermann & Loots, 1995

Genus of mites

Myrmozercon is a genus of mites in the family Laelapidae.

== Species ==
- Myrmozercon acuminatus (Berlese, 1903)
- Myrmozercon aequalis (Banks, 1916)
- Myrmozercon antennophoroides (Berlese, 1903)
- Myrmozercon brachiatus (Berlese, 1903)
- Myrmozercon brevipes Berlese, 1902
- Myrmozercon cyrusi Ghafarian & Joharchi, in Ghafarian, Joharchi, Jalalizand & Jalaeian, 2013
- Myrmozercon diplogenius (Berlese, 1903)
- Myrmozercon iainkayi Walter, 2003
- Myrmozercon karajensis Joharchi et al., 2011
- Myrmozercon liguricus (Vitzthum)
- Myrmozercon robustisetae Rosario & Hunter, 1988
- Myrmozercon rotundiscutum Rosario & Hunter, 1988
- Myrmozercon scutellatus (Hull, 1923)
