= Scorpionyssus =

Scientific classification
- Kingdom: Animalia
- Phylum: Arthropoda
- Subphylum: Chelicerata
- Class: Arachnida
- Order: Mesostigmata
- Family: Laelapidae
- Genus: Scorpionyssus; Fain & G. Rack, 1988

Genus of mites

Scorpionyssus is a genus of mites in the family Laelapidae.

== Species ==
- Scorpionyssus heterometrus Fain & G. Rack, 1988
