= Angosomaspis =

Scientific classification
- Kingdom: Animalia
- Phylum: Arthropoda
- Subphylum: Chelicerata
- Class: Arachnida
- Order: Mesostigmata
- Family: Laelapidae
- Genus: Angosomaspis; Costa, 1971

Genus of mites

Angosomaspis is a genus of mites in the family Laelapidae.

== Species ==
- Angosomaspis multisetosus Costa, 1971
