= Tur (mite) =

Scientific classification
- Kingdom: Animalia
- Phylum: Arthropoda
- Subphylum: Chelicerata
- Class: Arachnida
- Order: Mesostigmata
- Family: Laelapidae
- Genus: Tur; Baker & Wharton, 1952

Genus of mites

Tur is a genus of mites in the family Laelapidae.

== Species ==
- Tur amazonicus
- Tur apicalis
- Tur aymara
- Tur lativentralis
- Tur megistoproctus Gettinger & Bergallo, 2003
- Tur turki Fonseca
- Tur uniscutatus
