= Pililaelaps =

Scientific classification
- Kingdom: Animalia
- Phylum: Arthropoda
- Subphylum: Chelicerata
- Class: Arachnida
- Order: Mesostigmata
- Family: Laelapidae
- Genus: Pililaelaps; Radford, 1947

Genus of mites

Pililaelaps is a genus of mites in the family Laelapidae.

== Species ==
- Pililaelaps longiseta (Banks, 1909)
