= Domrownyssus =

Scientific classification
- Kingdom: Animalia
- Phylum: Arthropoda
- Subphylum: Chelicerata
- Class: Arachnida
- Order: Mesostigmata
- Family: Laelapidae
- Genus: Domrownyssus; Evans & Till, 1966

Genus of mites

Domrownyssus is a genus of mites in the family Laelapidae.

== Species ==
- Domrownyssus dentatus (Domrow, 1961)
