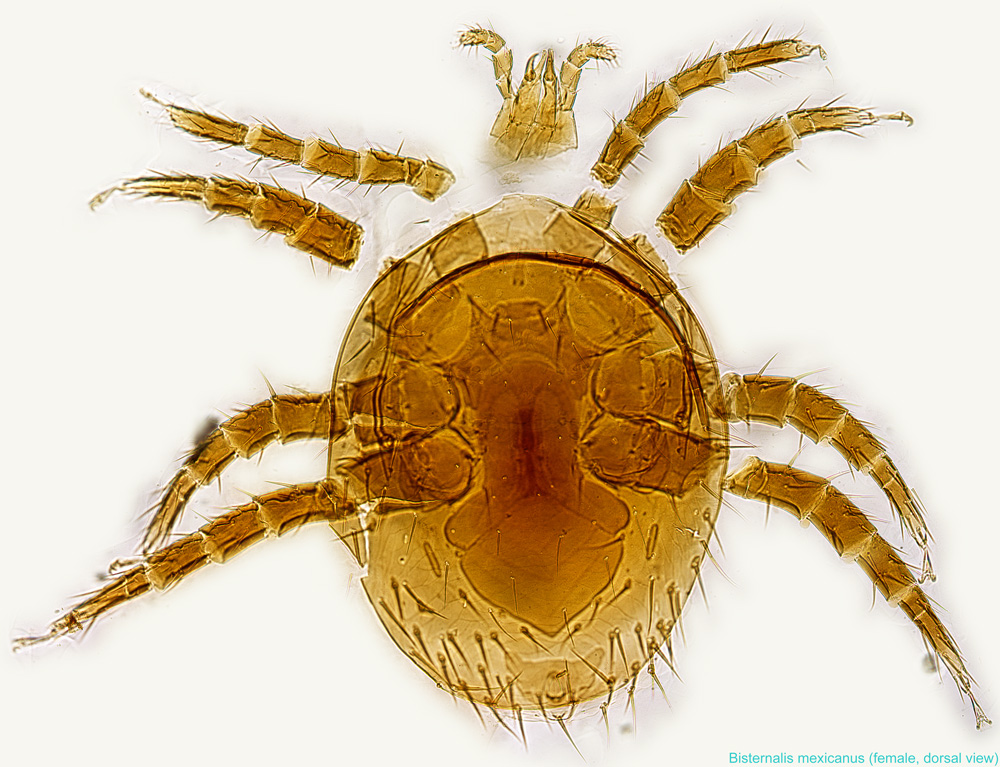
- Bisternalis mexicanus female

Scientific classification
- Kingdom: Animalia
- Phylum: Arthropoda
- Subphylum: Chelicerata
- Class: Arachnida
- Order: Mesostigmata
- Family: Laelapidae
- Genus: Bisternalis; Hunter, 1963

= Bisternalis =

Genus of mites

Bisternalis is a genus of mites in the family Laelapidae. The genus includes species of parasitic mites associated with various animal hosts.

== Species ==
- Bisternalis camargoi Baker, Flechtmann & Delfinado-Baker, 1984
- Bisternalis formosus Baker, Flechtmann & Delfinado-Baker, 1984
- Bisternalis hunteri Baker, Delfinado-Baker & Reyes-Ordaz, 1983
- Bisternalis mexicanus Baker, Delfinado-Baker & Reyes-Ordaz, 1983
- Bisternalis rettenmeyeri Hunter, 1963
- Bisternalis trigonarum Baker, Flechtmann & Delfinado-Baker, 1984
