= Liponysella =

Scientific classification
- Kingdom: Animalia
- Phylum: Arthropoda
- Subphylum: Chelicerata
- Class: Arachnida
- Order: Mesostigmata
- Family: Laelapidae
- Genus: Liponysella; Hirst, 1925

Genus of mites

Liponysella is a genus of mites in the family Laelapidae.

== Species ==
- Liponysella madagascariensis (Hirst, 1921)
