= Ornitholaelaps =

Scientific classification
- Kingdom: Animalia
- Phylum: Arthropoda
- Subphylum: Chelicerata
- Class: Arachnida
- Order: Mesostigmata
- Family: Laelapidae
- Genus: Ornitholaelaps; Okereke, 1968

Genus of mites

Ornitholaelaps is a genus of mites in the family Laelapidae.

== Species ==
- Ornitholaelaps nidi Okereke, 1968
