= Myrmolaelaps =

Scientific classification
- Kingdom: Animalia
- Phylum: Arthropoda
- Subphylum: Chelicerata
- Class: Arachnida
- Order: Mesostigmata
- Family: Laelapidae
- Genus: Myrmolaelaps; Trägårdh, 1906

Genus of mites

Myrmolaelaps is a genus of mites in the family Laelapidae.

== Species ==
- Myrmolaelaps equitans Trägårdh, 1906
