= Bolivilaelaps =

Scientific classification
- Kingdom: Animalia
- Phylum: Arthropoda
- Subphylum: Chelicerata
- Class: Arachnida
- Order: Mesostigmata
- Family: Laelapidae
- Genus: Bolivilaelaps; Fonseca, 1940

Genus of mites

Bolivilaelaps is a genus of mites in the family Laelapidae.

== Species ==
- Bolivilaelaps tricholabiatus Fonseca, 1940
