= Pseudoparasitus =

Scientific classification
- Kingdom: Animalia
- Phylum: Arthropoda
- Subphylum: Chelicerata
- Class: Arachnida
- Order: Mesostigmata
- Family: Laelapidae
- Genus: Pseudoparasitus; Oudemans, 1902

Genus of mites

Pseudoparasitus is a genus of mites in the family Laelapidae.

== Species ==
- Pseudoparasitus annectans (Womersley, 1955)
- Pseudoparasitus arculus Karg, 2003
- Pseudoparasitus australicus (Womersley, 1956)
- Pseudoparasitus bregetovae (Shereef & Soliman, 1981)
- Pseudoparasitus burdwanensis (Bhattacharyya, 1978)
- Pseudoparasitus camini (Domrow, 1957)
- Pseudoparasitus canestrinii (Berlese, 1892)
- Pseudoparasitus centralis Berlese, 1920
- Pseudoparasitus costalis Karg, 1978
- Pseudoparasitus exilis Karg, 1981
- Pseudoparasitus gamagarensis (Jordaan & Loots, 1987)
- Pseudoparasitus gracilipes (Banks, 1916)
- Pseudoparasitus gradulus (Karg, 2003)
- Pseudoparasitus guttulae Karg, 1997
- Pseudoparasitus holaspis (Oudemans, 1902)
- Pseudoparasitus holostaspoides (G. Canestrini, 1884)
- Pseudoparasitus indicus Bhattacharyya, 1977
- Pseudoparasitus interruptus Karg, 1994
- Pseudoparasitus juvencus Berlese, 1916
- Pseudoparasitus krantzi (Hunter, 1967)
- Pseudoparasitus leptochelae Karg, 1994
- Pseudoparasitus lignicola (G. Canestrini & R. Canestrini, 1882)
- Pseudoparasitus longospinosus (Karg, 2000)
- Pseudoparasitus marginatus Karg, 1997
- Pseudoparasitus meridionalis (G. Canestrini & R. Canestrini, 1882)
- Pseudoparasitus mexicana (Banks, 1915)
- Pseudoparasitus missouriensis (Ewing, 1909)
- Pseudoparasitus myrmicophilus (Berlese, 1892)
- Pseudoparasitus myrmophilus (Michael, 1891)
- Pseudoparasitus nasipodaliae Karg, 1993
- Pseudoparasitus nudus (Karg, 2000)
- Pseudoparasitus obovata (Womersley, 1960)
- Pseudoparasitus ocularis Karg, 1981
- Pseudoparasitus ordwayae (Eickwort, 1966)
- Pseudoparasitus parasitizans Berlese, 1916
- Pseudoparasitus parvioculus (Karg, 2000)
- Pseudoparasitus pinguis Karg, 1997
- Pseudoparasitus placentula (Berlese, 1887)
- Pseudoparasitus placidus (Banks, 1895)
- Pseudoparasitus planus (Womersley, 1956)
- Pseudoparasitus porulatus Karg, 1989
- Pseudoparasitus quadrisetatus Karg, 1981
- Pseudoparasitus rectagoni Karg, 1993
- Pseudoparasitus reniculus Karg, 1981
- Pseudoparasitus reticulatus Karg, 1978
- Pseudoparasitus retiventer (Karg, 2000)
- Pseudoparasitus schatzi Karg, 1993
- Pseudoparasitus sellnicki (Bregetova & Koroleva, 1964)
- Pseudoparasitus sinensis (Wang, Zhou & Ji, 1991)
- Pseudoparasitus sitalaensis (Bhattacharyya, 1978)
- Pseudoparasitus spathulatus Berlese, 1920
- Pseudoparasitus spinosus (Berlese, 1920)
- Pseudoparasitus stigmatus (Fox, 1946)
- Pseudoparasitus submyrmecophila Xu & Liang, 1996
- Pseudoparasitus sulcus (Karg, 2003)
- Pseudoparasitus tasmanicus (Womersley, 1956)
- Pseudoparasitus tonsilis Karg, 1989
- Pseudoparasitus translineatus Barylo, 1991
- Pseudoparasitus triquetrus Karg, 2003
- Pseudoparasitus unospinosus Karg, 1978
- Pseudoparasitus venetus (Berlese, 1904)
- Pseudoparasitus vitzthumi (Womersley, 1956)
- Pseudoparasitus wangi (Bai, Gu & Wang, 1996)
- Pseudoparasitus weishanensis (Gu & Guo, 1997)
- Pseudoparasitus zaheri (Afifi & Abdel-Halim, 1988)
