= Chelanyssus =

Scientific classification
- Kingdom: Animalia
- Phylum: Arthropoda
- Subphylum: Chelicerata
- Class: Arachnida
- Order: Mesostigmata
- Family: Laelapidae
- Genus: Chelanyssus; Zumpt & Till, 1953

Genus of mites

Chelanyssus is a genus of mites in the family Laelapidae.

== Species ==
- Chelanyssus forsythi (Zumpt, 1950)
