= Blaberolaelaps =

Scientific classification
- Kingdom: Animalia
- Phylum: Arthropoda
- Subphylum: Chelicerata
- Class: Arachnida
- Order: Mesostigmata
- Family: Laelapidae
- Genus: Blaberolaelaps; M. Costa, 1980

Genus of mites

Blaberolaelaps is a genus of mites in the family Laelapidae.

== Species ==
- Blaberolaelaps beckeri Hunter, Rosario & Flechtmann, 1988
- Blaberolaelaps matthiesensis M. Costa, 1980
