= Mungosicola =

Scientific classification
- Kingdom: Animalia
- Phylum: Arthropoda
- Subphylum: Chelicerata
- Class: Arachnida
- Order: Mesostigmata
- Family: Laelapidae
- Genus: Mungosicola; Radford, 1942

Genus of mites

Mungosicola is a genus of mites in the family Laelapidae.

== Species ==
- Mungosicola ugandae Radford, 1942
