= Chamolaelaps =

Scientific classification
- Kingdom: Animalia
- Phylum: Arthropoda
- Subphylum: Chelicerata
- Class: Arachnida
- Order: Mesostigmata
- Family: Laelapidae
- Genus: Chamolaelaps; Hull, in F.Türk & S.Türk 1952

Genus of mites

Chamolaelaps is a genus of mites in the family Laelapidae.

== Species ==
- Chamolaelaps hypudaei (Oudemans, 1902)
