= Ugandolaelaps =

Scientific classification
- Kingdom: Animalia
- Phylum: Arthropoda
- Subphylum: Chelicerata
- Class: Arachnida
- Order: Mesostigmata
- Family: Laelapidae
- Genus: Ugandolaelaps; Radford, 1942

Genus of mites

Ugandolaelaps is a genus of mites in the family Laelapidae.

== Species ==
- Ugandolaelaps protoxera Radford, 1942
