= Myonyssoides =

Scientific classification
- Kingdom: Animalia
- Phylum: Arthropoda
- Subphylum: Chelicerata
- Class: Arachnida
- Order: Mesostigmata
- Family: Laelapidae
- Genus: Myonyssoides; Hirst, 1925

Genus of mites

Myonyssoides is a genus of mites in the family Laelapidae.

== Species ==
- Myonyssoides capensis Hirst, 1925
