= Dicrocheles =

Scientific classification
- Kingdom: Animalia
- Phylum: Arthropoda
- Subphylum: Chelicerata
- Class: Arachnida
- Order: Mesostigmata
- Family: Laelapidae
- Genus: Dicrocheles; Krantz & Khot, 1962

Genus of mites

Dicrocheles is a genus of mites in the family Laelapidae.

== Species ==
- Dicrocheles hippeoides Treat, 1978
- Dicrocheles phalaenodectes (Treat, 1954)
