= Dynatochela =

Scientific classification
- Kingdom: Animalia
- Phylum: Arthropoda
- Subphylum: Chelicerata
- Class: Arachnida
- Order: Mesostigmata
- Family: Laelapidae
- Genus: Dynatochela; Keegan, 1950

Genus of mites

Dynatochela is a genus of mites in the family Laelapidae.

== Species ==
- Dynatochela primus Keegan, 1950
