= Jordensia =

Scientific classification
- Kingdom: Animalia
- Phylum: Arthropoda
- Subphylum: Chelicerata
- Class: Arachnida
- Order: Mesostigmata
- Family: Laelapidae
- Genus: Jordensia; Oudemans, 1937

Genus of mites

Jordensia is a genus of mites in the family Laelapidae.

== Species ==
- Jordensia cossi (Dugès, 1834)
