= Dynastaspis =

Scientific classification
- Kingdom: Animalia
- Phylum: Arthropoda
- Subphylum: Chelicerata
- Class: Arachnida
- Order: Mesostigmata
- Family: Laelapidae
- Genus: Dynastaspis; Costa, 1971

Genus of mites

Dynastaspis is a genus of mites in the family Laelapidae.

== Species ==
- Dynastaspis walhallae Costa, 1971
