= Melittiphisoides =

Scientific classification
- Kingdom: Animalia
- Phylum: Arthropoda
- Subphylum: Chelicerata
- Class: Arachnida
- Order: Mesostigmata
- Family: Laelapidae
- Genus: Melittiphisoides; M. Delfinado-Baker, E. W. Baker & C. H. W. Flechtmann, 1984

Genus of mites

Melittiphisoides is a genus of mites in the family Laelapidae.

== Species ==
- Melittiphisoides apiarium M. Delfinado-Baker, E. W. Baker & C. H. W. Flechtmann, 1984
