= Rhodacantha =

Scientific classification
- Kingdom: Animalia
- Phylum: Arthropoda
- Subphylum: Chelicerata
- Class: Arachnida
- Order: Mesostigmata
- Family: Laelapidae
- Genus: Rhodacantha; R. Domrow, 1979

Genus of mites

Rhodacantha is a genus of mites in the family Laelapidae.

== Species ==
- Rhodacantha nelsoni R. Domrow, 1979
- Rhodacantha tenax Domrow, 1979
