= Neohypoaspis =

Scientific classification
- Kingdom: Animalia
- Phylum: Arthropoda
- Subphylum: Chelicerata
- Class: Arachnida
- Order: Mesostigmata
- Family: Laelapidae
- Genus: Neohypoaspis; M. Delfinado-Baker, E. W. Baker & D. W. Roubik, 1983

Genus of mites

Neohypoaspis is a genus of mites in the family Laelapidae.

== Species ==
- Neohypoaspis ampliseta M. Delfinado-Baker, E. W. Baker & D. W. Roubik, 1983
