= Eugynolaelaps =

Scientific classification
- Kingdom: Animalia
- Phylum: Arthropoda
- Subphylum: Chelicerata
- Class: Arachnida
- Order: Mesostigmata
- Family: Laelapidae
- Genus: Eugynolaelaps; Berlese, 1918

Genus of mites

Eugynolaelaps is a genus of mites in the family Laelapidae.

== Species ==
- Eugynolaelaps coriaceus Berlese, 1918
