= Metaspinolaelaps =

Scientific classification
- Kingdom: Animalia
- Phylum: Arthropoda
- Subphylum: Chelicerata
- Class: Arachnida
- Order: Mesostigmata
- Family: Laelapidae
- Genus: Metaspinolaelaps; Till, 1958

Genus of mites

Metaspinolaelaps is a genus of mites in the family Laelapidae.

== Species ==
- Metaspinolaelaps aelleni Till, 1958
