= Stigmatolaelaps =

Scientific classification
- Kingdom: Animalia
- Phylum: Arthropoda
- Subphylum: Chelicerata
- Class: Arachnida
- Order: Mesostigmata
- Family: Laelapidae
- Genus: Stigmatolaelaps; Krantz, 1998

Genus of mites

Stigmatolaelaps is a genus of mites in the family Laelapidae.

== Species ==
- Stigmatolaelaps greeni (Oudemans, 1902)
- Stigmatolaelaps hunteri Krantz, 1998
- Stigmatolaelaps sumatrensis Krantz, 1998
