= Dianolaelaps =

Scientific classification
- Kingdom: Animalia
- Phylum: Arthropoda
- Subphylum: Chelicerata
- Class: Arachnida
- Order: Mesostigmata
- Family: Laelapidae
- Genus: Dianolaelaps; Y. M. Gu & Q. X. Duan, 1990

Genus of mites

Dianolaelaps is a genus of mites in the family Laelapidae.

== Species ==
- Dianolaelaps gryllus Y. M. Gu & Q. X. Duan, 1990
