= Laelaspoides =

Scientific classification
- Kingdom: Animalia
- Phylum: Arthropoda
- Subphylum: Chelicerata
- Class: Arachnida
- Order: Mesostigmata
- Family: Laelapidae
- Genus: Laelaspoides; Eickwort, 1966

Genus of mites

Laelaspoides is a genus of mites in the family Laelapidae.

== Species ==
- Laelapsoides dentatus (Halbert, 1920)
- Laelaspoides ordwayae Eickwort, 1966 — found in the underground nests of halictid bees, genus Augochlorella.
