= Oryctolaelaps =

Scientific classification
- Kingdom: Animalia
- Phylum: Arthropoda
- Subphylum: Chelicerata
- Class: Arachnida
- Order: Mesostigmata
- Family: Laelapidae
- Genus: Oryctolaelaps; Lange, in Bregetova et al., 1955

Genus of mites

Oryctolaelaps is a genus of mites in the family Laelapidae.

== Species ==
- Oryctolaelaps bibikovae Lange, in Bregetova et al., 1955
