= Neolaelaps =

Scientific classification
- Kingdom: Animalia
- Phylum: Arthropoda
- Subphylum: Chelicerata
- Class: Arachnida
- Order: Mesostigmata
- Family: Laelapidae
- Genus: Neolaelaps; Hirst, 1926

Genus of mites

Neolaelaps is a genus of mites in the family Laelapidae.

== Species ==
- Neolaelaps magnistigmatus (Vitzthum, 1918)
- Neolaelaps palpispinosus Strandtmann & Garrett, 1967
- Neolaelaps spinosus (Berlese, 1910)
- Neolaelaps vitzthumi Domrow, 1961
