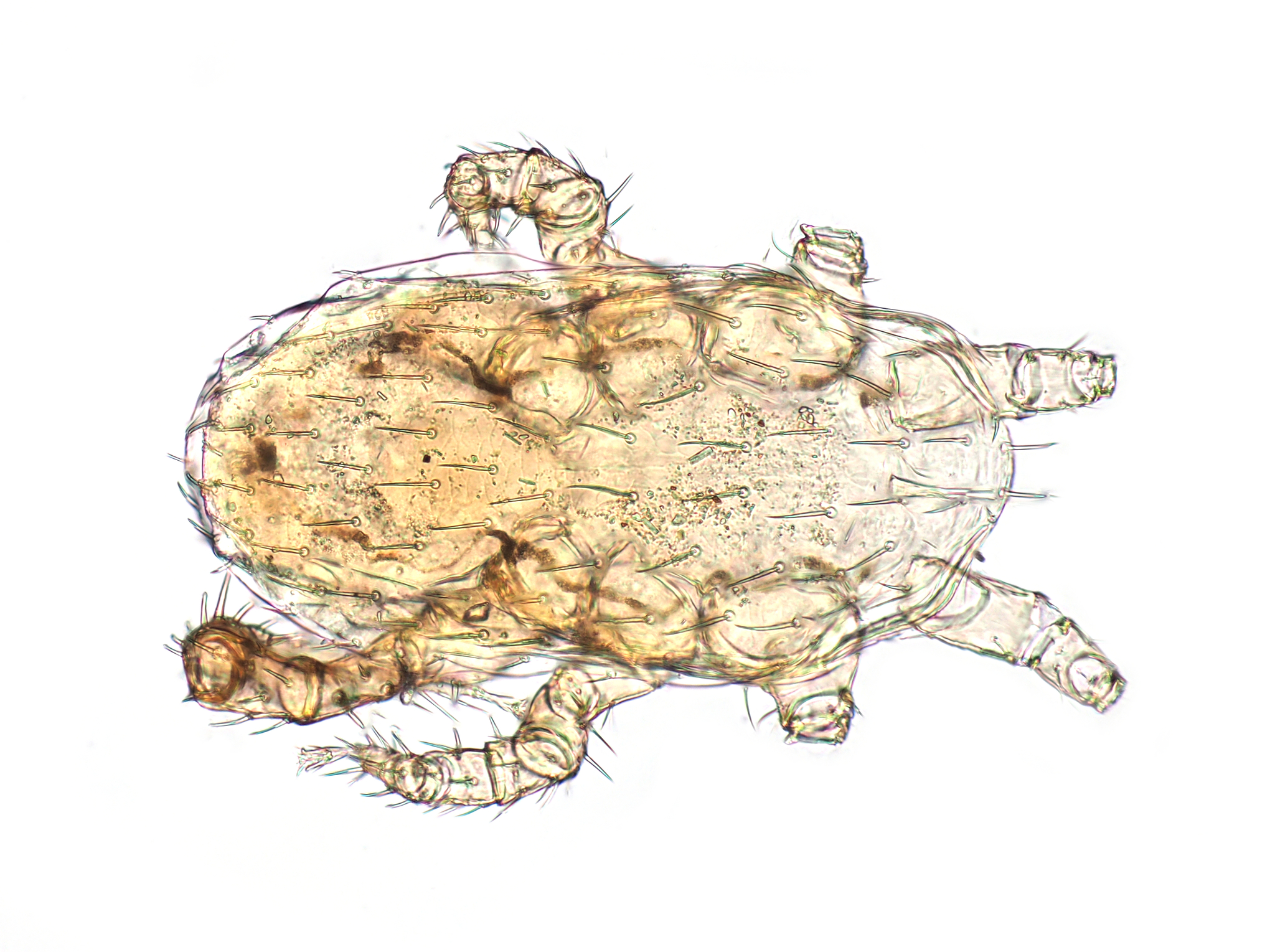

Scientific classification
- Kingdom: Animalia
- Phylum: Arthropoda
- Subphylum: Chelicerata
- Class: Arachnida
- Order: Mesostigmata
- Family: Laelapidae
- Genus: Gaeolaelaps; Evans & Till, 1966

= Gaeolaelaps =

Genus of mites

Gaeolaelaps is a genus of mite.

The genus was long considered a subgenus of Hypoaspis, but restored to genus level in 2009 to contain species with a denticulate tectum.

== Species ==
- Gaeolaelaps aculeifer (Canestrini, 1883)
- Gaeolaelaps angusta (Karg, 1965)
- Gaeolaelaps angustiscutatus (Willmann, 1951)
- Gaeolaelaps deinos (Zeman, 1982)
- Gaeolaelops gillespiei Beaulieu, 2009
- Gaeolaelaps glabrosimilis (Hirschmann, Bernhard, Greim & Gotz, 1969)
- Gaeolaelaps iranicus Kavianpour & Nemati, in Kavianpour, Nemati, Gwiazdowicz & Kocheili, 2013
- Gaeolaelaps kargi (Costa, 1968)
- Gaeolaelaps minor (Costa, 1968)
- Gaeolaelaps nolli (Karg, 1962)
- Gaeolaelaps oreithyiae (Walter & Oliver, 1989)
- Gaeolaelaps praesternalis (Willmann, 1949)
- Gaeolaelaps queenslandicus (Womersley, 1956)
