= Pleisiolaelaps =

Scientific classification
- Kingdom: Animalia
- Phylum: Arthropoda
- Subphylum: Chelicerata
- Class: Arachnida
- Order: Mesostigmata
- Family: Laelapidae
- Genus: Pleisiolaelaps; Womersley, 1957

Genus of mites

Pleisiolaelaps is a genus of mites in the family Laelapidae.

== Species ==
- Pleisiolaelaps miniopterus Womersley, 1957
