= Ellsworthia =

Scientific classification
- Kingdom: Animalia
- Phylum: Arthropoda
- Subphylum: Chelicerata
- Class: Arachnida
- Order: Mesostigmata
- Family: Laelapidae
- Genus: Ellsworthia; Türk, 1945

Genus of mites

Ellsworthia is a genus of mites in the family Laelapidae.

== Species ==
- Ellsworthia americanus Ewing, 1933
- Ellsworthia imphalensis (Radford, 1947)
