= Reticulolaelaps =

Scientific classification
- Kingdom: Animalia
- Phylum: Arthropoda
- Subphylum: Chelicerata
- Class: Arachnida
- Order: Mesostigmata
- Family: Laelapidae
- Genus: Reticulolaelaps; Costa, 1968

Genus of mites

Reticulolaelaps is a genus of mites in the family Laelapidae.

== Species ==
- Reticulolaelaps faini Costa, 1968
- Reticulolaelaps lativentris Karg, 1978
