= Mysolaelaps =

Scientific classification
- Kingdom: Animalia
- Phylum: Arthropoda
- Subphylum: Chelicerata
- Class: Arachnida
- Order: Mesostigmata
- Family: Laelapidae
- Genus: Mysolaelaps; Fonseca, 1935

Genus of mites

Mysolaelaps is a genus of mites in the family Laelapidae.

== Species ==
- Mysolaelaps alpinus Guo-Tianyu, Pan-Fenggeng & Yan-G, 1999
- Mysolaelaps parvispinosus Fonseca, 1935
