= Turkhel =

Pakistani ethnic group

The Turkhel (Urdu: ترک خیل) is a tribe located in the Mianwali District of Punjab (Pakistan).

== History and origin ==
According to 1911 census the Turkhel were the principal clan in district by population. According to traditions, the Turkhel were originally descendants of slaves. The word Khel in Pashto means tribe and Tur means Black.

Like other tribes of the district, they are trilingual, speaking Pashto, Punjabi (along with Siraiki language) and Urdu. According to 1901 census during British Raj, they numbered about 250.

== Distribution ==
They are mainly found in the towns of Kalabagh and Marri Indus, in the Isakhel Tehsil of Mianwali District.

Many have now migrated to Karachi, and are involved in transportation business in the city.
