= Japanoasternolaelaps =

Scientific classification
- Kingdom: Animalia
- Phylum: Arthropoda
- Subphylum: Chelicerata
- Class: Arachnida
- Order: Mesostigmata
- Family: Ichthyostomatogasteridae
- Genus: Japanoasternolaelaps; W. Hirschmann & N. Hiramatsu, 1984

Genus of mites

Japanoasternolaelaps is a genus of mites in the family Ichthyostomatogasteridae.

IRMNG lists just one species for this genus: Japanoasternolaelaps japanensis W. Hirschmann & N. Hiramatsu, 1984
