= Eumellitiphis =

Scientific classification
- Kingdom: Animalia
- Phylum: Arthropoda
- Subphylum: Chelicerata
- Class: Arachnida
- Order: Mesostigmata
- Family: Laelapidae
- Genus: Eumellitiphis; Türk, 1948

Genus of mites

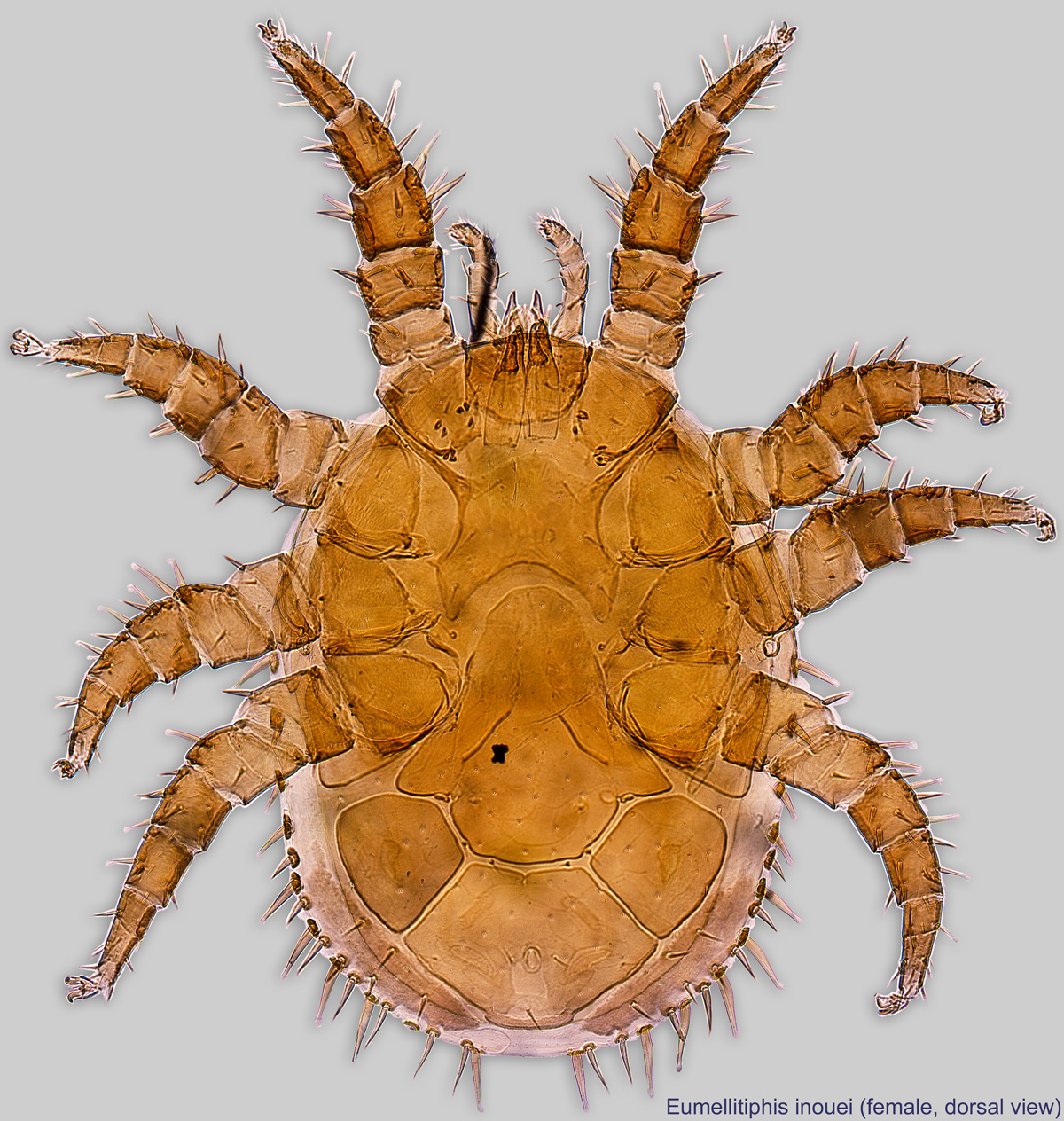
Eumellitiphis inouei

Eumellitiphis is a genus of mites in the family Laelapidae.

== Species ==
- Eumellitiphis inouei Delfinado-Baker & Baker, 1988
- Eumellitiphis mellitus Türk, 1948
- Eumellitiphis philippinensis Delfinado-Baker & Baker, 1988
