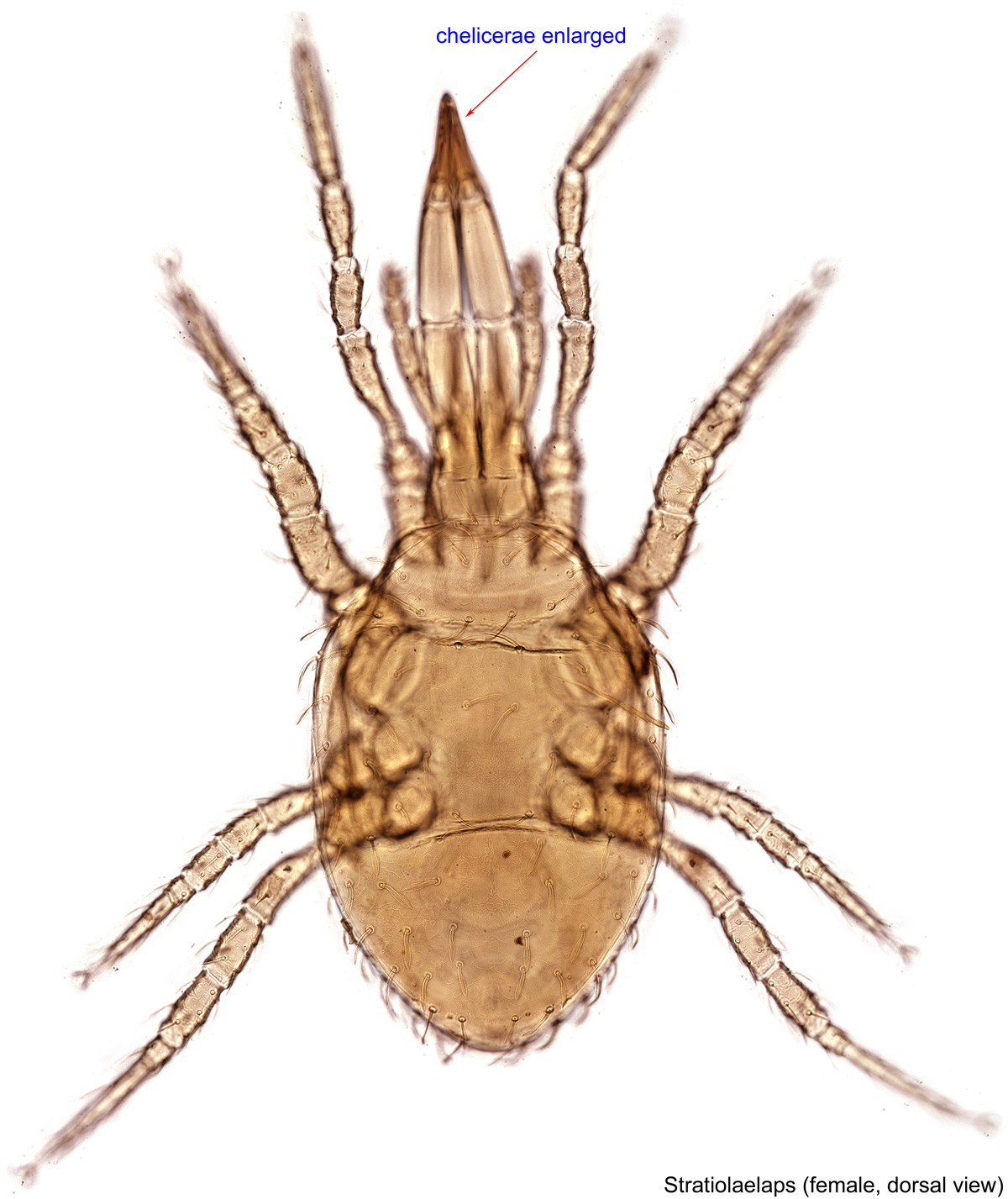

Scientific classification
- Kingdom: Animalia
- Phylum: Arthropoda
- Subphylum: Chelicerata
- Class: Arachnida
- Order: Mesostigmata
- Family: Laelapidae
- Genus: Stratiolaelaps; Berlese, 1916

= Stratiolaelaps =

Genus of mites

Stratiolaelaps is a genus of mites in the family Laelapidae.

== Species ==
- Stratiolaelaps antennata (Karg, 1993)
- Stratiolaelaps gibbosus (Koyumdzhieva, 1979)
- Stratiolaelaps lamington Walter & Campbell, 2003
- Stratiolaelaps lorna Walter & Campbell, 2003
- Stratiolaelaps marilyn Walter & Campbell, 2003
- Stratiolaelaps miles (Berlese, 1892)
- Stratiolaelaps reticulata Zumpt & Patterson, 1951
- Stratiolaelaps scimitus (Womersley, 1956)
- Stratiolaelaps womersleyi Walter & Campbell, 2003
