= Promacrolaelaps =

Scientific classification
- Kingdom: Animalia
- Phylum: Arthropoda
- Subphylum: Chelicerata
- Class: Arachnida
- Order: Mesostigmata
- Family: Laelapidae
- Genus: Promacrolaelaps; Costa, 1971

Genus of mites

Promacrolaelaps is a genus of mites in the family Laelapidae.

== Species ==
- Promacrolaelaps hunteri Costa, 1971
