= Coleolaelaps =

Scientific classification
- Kingdom: Animalia
- Phylum: Arthropoda
- Subphylum: Chelicerata
- Class: Arachnida
- Order: Mesostigmata
- Family: Laelapidae
- Genus: Coleolaelaps; Berlese, 1914

Genus of mites

Coleolaelaps is a genus of mites in the family Laelapidae.

== Species ==
- Coleolaelaps agrestis (Berlese, 1887)
- Coleolaelaps asiaticus Karg, 1999
- Coleolaelaps costai Joharchi & Halliday, 2011
- Coleolaelaps inopinatus Grandi, 1925
- Coleolaelaps tongyuensis Ma, 1997
- Coleolaelaps variosetatus Karg, 1999
