= Bruce Turkel =

- Born: 1957 (age 68–69); Miami Beach, Florida
- Education: University of Florida
- Occupation: Founder of turkel brands

Bruce Turkel (born 1957) is a creative entrepreneur, speaker and author on the subject of branding.

== Biography ==
Turkel was born and raised in Miami Beach, Florida. His father, Leonard Turkel and his mother, Annsheila Turkel moved to Miami from New York City in 1956. He attended the University of Florida from 1976 to 1980 where he earned degrees in Fine Arts and Design.

He began his advertising career in New York in 1980, but returned to Miami in 1983 and founded Turkel Brands, the branding and advertising agency he now heads. Turkel is a founder and board member of The Strategic Forum (TSF), a South Florida-based executive organization that creates business opportunities for members and students from Nova Southeastern University's. Wayne Huizenga College of Business and Entrepreneurship.

Turkel is also a professional speaker and author. He has written three books on branding and marketing, Brain Darts, New Design: Miami, and Building Brand Value and one novel, The Mouth of the South, A member of the National Speakers Association, he has spoken for Fortune 500 companies including Nike, Toll Brothers and Discovery Channel, at conferences such as Destination Marketing Association International, NAMM, MPI, and ProMax and at universities including MIT and Harvard. He has contributed to Fox Business Channel and The Miami Herald, and has been referenced in The New York Times and Fortune.

== Books ==
- Brain darts : the advertising design of Turkel Schwartz & Partners(1999). Rockport Publ. . ISBN 978-1564965653.
- New Design: Miami. (2000) Rockport Pub. ISBN 978-1564966605.
- Building brand value : seven simple steps to profitable communications. (2005) BookSurge Publishing. ISBN 978-1419623493.
- The Mouth of the South. (2011)
- All About Them: Grow Your Business by Focusing on Others. (2016) Brilliance Audio Lib Edn. ISBN 9781522651642.
- Is That All There Is? What Are You Doing For The Rest Of Your Life? (2021). ISBN 9781737379.
