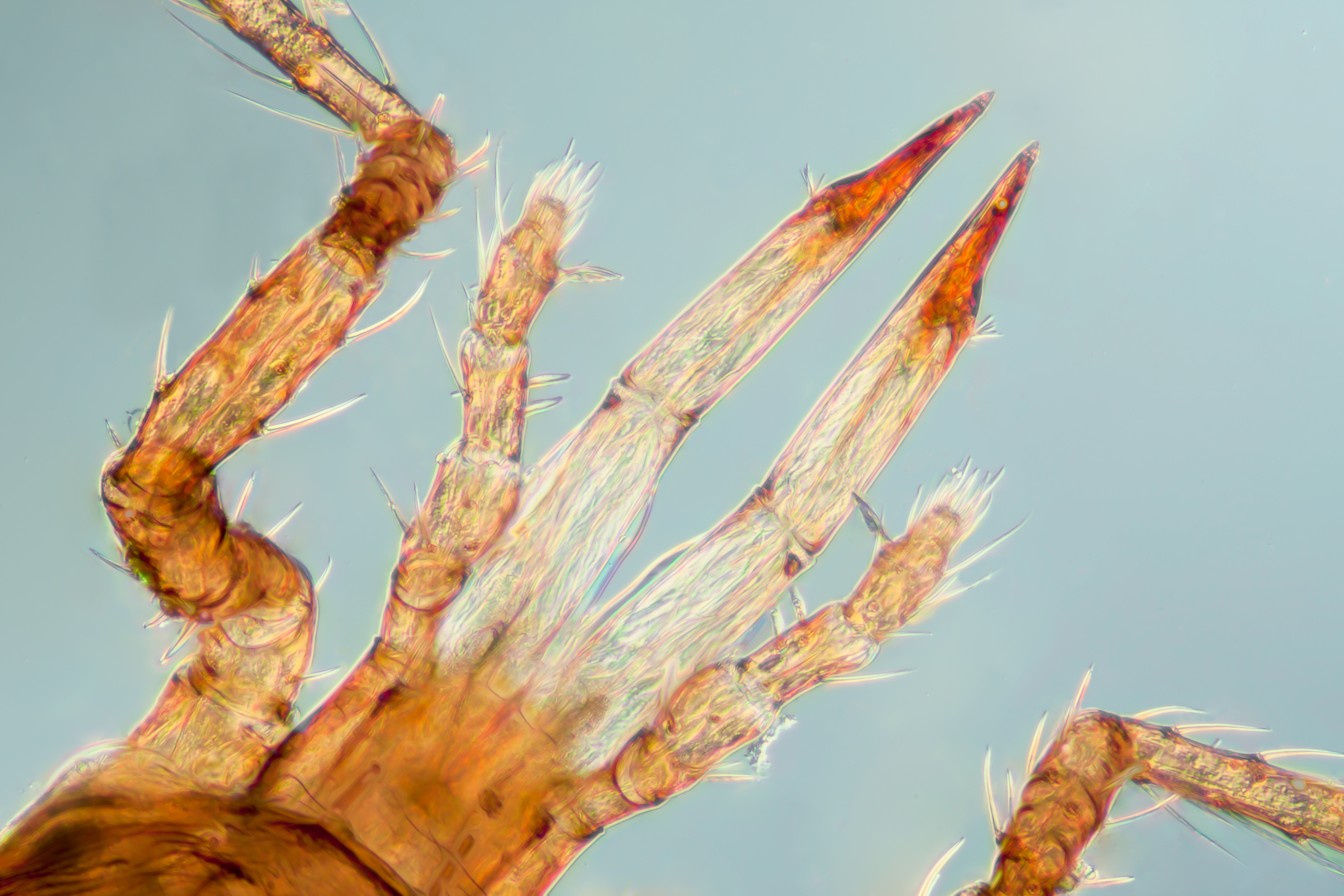

Scientific classification
- Kingdom: Animalia
- Phylum: Arthropoda
- Subphylum: Chelicerata
- Class: Arachnida
- Order: Mesostigmata
- Family: Laelapidae
- Genus: Stratiolaelaps
- Species: S. scimitus

Binomial name
- Stratiolaelaps scimitus (Womersley, 1956)

Synonyms
- Cosmolaelaps scimitus Womersley, 1956; Hypoaspis miles (Berlese, 1892)

= Stratiolaelaps scimitus =

Species of mite

Stratiolaelaps scimitus (formerly Hypoaspis miles) is a small (0.5 mm) light brown mite that lives in the top 1/2 inch (13 mm) layer of soil. As a natural predator of fungus gnat pupae and of the snail parasite Riccardoella limacum it is used by gardeners and snail breeders for biological pest control. Stratiolaelaps scimitus is also commonly used by reptile, amphibian and invertebrate keepers as a preventative or reactive measure against grain mites and reptile mites. Whereas most mite treatments are based on synthetic chemicals, predatory mites are used as a biological method of preventing and curing mite infestations.

Stratiolaelaps scimitus and the similar species, S. aculiefer are soil-dwelling, predatory mites. Stratiolaelaps mites feed on fungus gnats, springtails, thrips pupae, and other small insects in the soil. The mite is 0.5 mm (1/50 in) long and light-brown in color. It inhabits the top 1/2 inch (13 mm) layer of soil. Both nymphs and adults feed on soil-inhabiting pests, consuming up to 5 prey per day. They may survive by feeding on algae and/or plant debris when insects are unavailable. Both males and females are present, but males are smaller and rarely seen.

Stratiolaelaps is well adapted to moist conditions in greenhouses in a variety of growing media, but does not tolerate standing water. Hypoaspis is currently used in greenhouses for control of fungus gnats. It feeds on fungus gnat eggs and small larvae and is most effective when applied before fungus gnat populations become established or when populations are low. It has been successfully used in bedding plant production, potted plants, and poinsettia stock plants. Stratiolaelaps will also attack thrips pupae in the soil, but cannot be relied on alone for thrips control in a commercial greenhouse. It may, however, enhance biological control when used in conjunction with predators feeding on thrips on the foliage. In small-scale experiments this mite reduced emergence of adult thrips to about 30% of that in controls.

== Reproduction ==
Stratiolaelaps scimitus reproduces both sexually and asexually, with unfertilized females producing only males, while fertilized females produce both males and females. The eggs are laid in soil. Males are smaller than the females and each female can lay up to three oval eggs per day. The eggs hatch in one to three days producing a six-legged larvae that grows into an eight-leg nymph.Time from egg to an adult is dependent on temperature, ranging from 10 to 34 days, with warmer temperatures producing quicker maturation.
