= Roma Rudd Turkel =

American writer

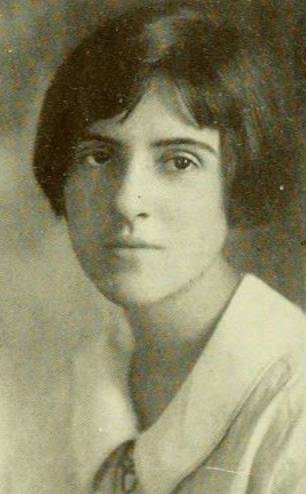
- Roma Rudd Turkel, from the 1926 yearbook of Barnard College
- Born: 1906; Washington, D.C., U.S.
- Died: March 7, 1968 (age 61); Brooklyn, New York, U.S.
- Occupations: Writer, editor, lecturer

Roma Rudd Turkel (1906 – March 7, 1968) was an American writer, editor, and lecturer. Her writings as a Catholic convert were published in newspapers across the United States, and in The Family Digest, mostly in during the 1940s and 1950s.

== Early life and education ==
Rudd was born in Washington, D.C., the daughter of Channing Rudd and Florence Stevens Rudd (later MacFarland). Her father was a lawyer, college professor, and bank official. She graduated from Barnard College in 1926. She pursued further studies at Fordham University. "I have a college diploma moldering away in one of the trunks we use for dead storage," she wrote in 1948. "I am not proud of it—nor of the education I received at that distinguished college." She advised Catholic students to avoid non-sectarian higher education.

== Career ==
Turkel was an adult convert to Catholicism, and most of her writing, editing, and public speaking were in Catholic contexts. She was editor of the monthly magazine Information, and special projects editor at the Paulist Newman Press. Her book Day After Tomorrow (1956) about planning for old age, was described as "warm, earnest reading". She took particular interest in issues at the intersections of Catholic parenting and public schooling. She also translated French Catholic works into English.

== Publications ==
- "'It's Like Leading Sheep to Slaughter'; College Graduate Writes to Those About to Finish High School" (1948)
- "Open Letter to a Nun" (1948)
- "I Went to Confession the Hard Way" (1948)
- "Come soon, Come often...but don't come on Friday!" (1949)
- "Home is What You Make It" (1949)
- "A Convert Tells You How to Help Your Pastor" (1951)
- "Why Be Chaste?" (1951)
- "Danger: School Zone" (1952)
- "Mixed Marriage" (1952, poem)
- "Curfew" (1955)
- Day After Tomorrow: Preparing for the Later Years (1956)
- "Why They Go Steady" (1956)
- "Occasions of Sin" (1958)
- "The 'Going Steady Crisis'" (1958)
- "How to Keep Your Mental Health" (1959, pamphlet)
- "Story of Christmas is Christ" (1962)

== Personal life ==
Rudd married salesman John J. Turkel in 1927. They had four sons. She converted from Episcopalian to Roman Catholic in 1938. She died in 1968, at the age of 61, in Brooklyn.
