= Turkiella =

Scientific classification
- Kingdom: Animalia
- Phylum: Arthropoda
- Subphylum: Chelicerata
- Class: Arachnida
- Order: Mesostigmata
- Family: Laelapidae
- Genus: Turkiella; Zumpt & Till, 1953

Genus of mites

Turkiella is a genus of mite in the family Laelapidae.

== Species ==
- Turkiella theseus (Zumpt)
