= Jacobsonia (mite) =

Scientific classification
- Kingdom: Animalia
- Phylum: Arthropoda
- Subphylum: Chelicerata
- Class: Arachnida
- Order: Mesostigmata
- Family: Laelapidae
- Genus: Jacobsonia; Berlese, 1910

Genus of mites

Jacobsonia is a genus of mites in the family Laelapidae.

== Species ==
- Jacobsonia africanus Fain, 1994
- Jacobsonia andrei Fain, 1994
- Jacobsonia berlesei Casanueva & Johnston, 1992
- Jacobsonia puylaerti Fain, 1994
- Jacobsonia submollis (Berlese, 1910)
- Jacobsonia tertia Vitzthum, 1931
