= Henry Ellsworth Ewing =

American arachnologist (1883–1951)

- Born: February 11, 1883; Arcola, Illinois, U.S.
- Died: January 5, 1951 (aged 67); Washington, D.C., U.S.
- Resting place: Rock Creek Cemetery, Washington, D.C., U.S.
- Education: Knox College; University of Illinois; University of Chicago; Cornell University (PhD)
- Occupation: Arachnologist
- Spouse: Bertha Riley Ewing
- Children: 2
- Scientific career
- Fields: Arachnology

Henry Ellsworth Ewing (February 11, 1883 – January 5, 1951) was an American arachnologist. He worked at several universities, but spent most of his career at the Bureau of Entomology and Plant Quarantine. Ewing was considered an authority on arachnids, particularly mites.

== Early life and education ==
Henry Ellsworth Ewing was born on February 11, 1883, in Arcola, Illinois. He attended Knox College and obtained a bachelor's degree at the University of Illinois in 1906. In 1908, he received a master's degree from the University of Illinois. In 1906 and 1907, he was a student at the University of Chicago. In 1910 and 1911, he was a Schuyler fellow at Cornell University, which is where he earned his PhD in 1911.

== Career ==
From 1908 to 1909, Ewing taught high school. Ewing's first job in the biological sciences was as an Assistant Entomologist at Oregon State University. He held this position from 1911 to 1914. He then worked at Iowa State University as an assistant professor of zoology and entomology from 1914 to 1916. At Iowa State, he was promoted to associate professor, a position he held from 1916 to 1919. In 1919, he began working at the Bureau of Entomology and Plant Quarantine as a specialist in arachnids. He retired from the Bureau in 1945.

Ewing was a prolific publisher of research on mites, with 155 published works. He also contributed to Encyclopædia Britannica and National Geographic. Proceedings of the Iowa Academy of Science referred to his book "A Manual of External Parasites" as his magnum opus.

== Organization memberships ==
Ewing was a member of multiple scientific organizations:

- Fellow at the American Association for the Advancement of Science
- Fellow at the Entomological Society of America
- Member of the American Society of Ichthyologists and Herpetologists
- Member of the American Society of Parasitologists and President in 1944
- Member of the Biological Society of Washington
- Member of the Ecological Society of America
- Member of the Entomological Society of Washington and President in 1941
- Member of the Helminthological Society of Washington, one of its founders, and President in 1931
- Member of the Illinois Academy of Sciences
- Member of the Iowa Academy of Science
- Member of the Washington Academy of Sciences

== Personal life and death ==
Ewing was married to Bertha Riley Ewing. He had at least two children: a son, Paul, and a daughter, Lydia Frances Grover. He was an active member of his church and frequently volunteered his time to help with nature programs for the Boy Scouts of America. He died in Garfield Hospital in Washington, D.C. on January 5, 1951. He was buried in Rock Creek Cemetery.
