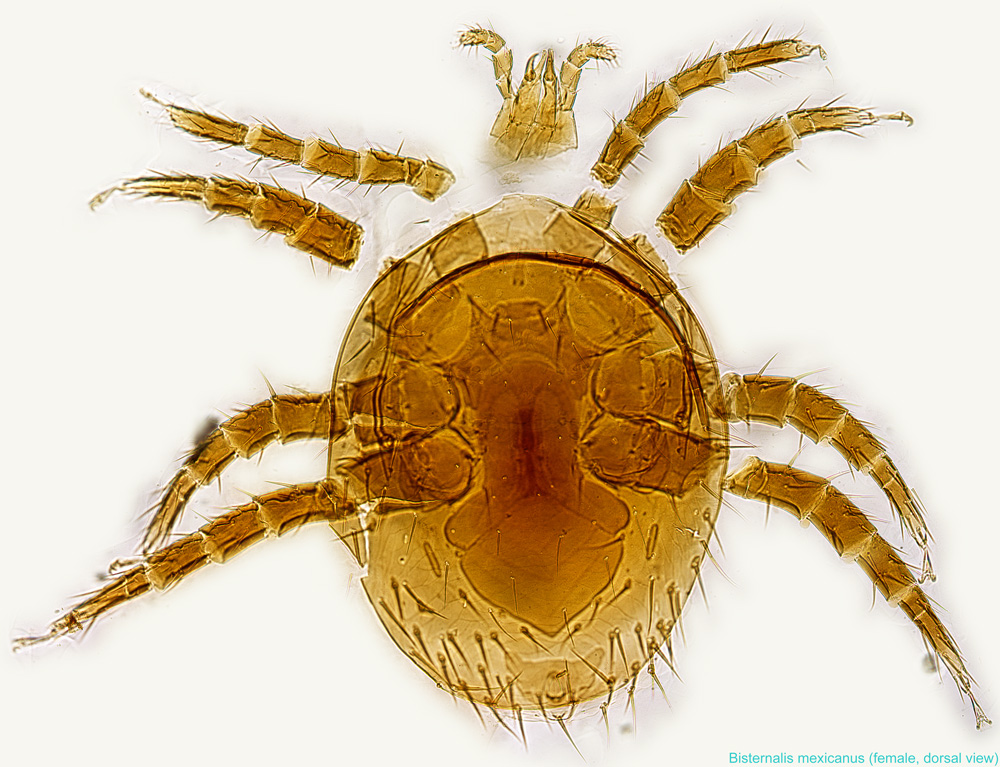

Scientific classification
- Kingdom: Animalia
- Phylum: Arthropoda
- Subphylum: Chelicerata
- Class: Arachnida
- Order: Mesostigmata
- Superfamily: Dermanyssoidea
- Family: Laelapidae; Berlese, 1892

= Laelapidae =

Laelapidae Temporal range: Palaeogene–present

Family of mites

The Laelapidae are a family of mites in the order Mesostigmata. The family is also referred to in the literature as Laelaptidae, which may be the correct spelling.

== Description ==
Laelapidae have a shield covering all or most of the dorsal surface (holodorsal shield). Ventrally, there is a sternal shield with 3 pairs of setae, a tongue- or flask-shaped genital shield (greatly expanded in Ololaelaps) with usually at least 1 pair of setae, and a small anal shield with 3 circumanal setae. The peritremes are typically long and the peritrematal shields often narrow.

== Ecology ==
Laelapidae is the most ecologically diverse group of Mesostigmata. As of 2012, there were ten laelapid genera known to be free-living predators in soil, thirty-five that are ectoparasites on mammals (e.g. rodents) and forty-three have species associated with arthropods. Laelapidae are the only family in superfamily Dermanyssoidea to include free-living predators.

Among the arthropod-associated laelapids are taxa associated with bees. Raymentia are associated with Lasioglossum sweat bees and may be pollen-feeders, Neohypoaspis are predators on astigmatid mites in stingless bee nests, Pneumolaelaps feed on pollen and nectar in bumblebee nests, Melittiphis alvearius feeds on pollen in European honeybee nests and Tropilaelaps are obligatory parasites of honeybees.

Other arthropod-associated laelapids include species of Hypoaspis sensu lato associated with burrowing cockroaches and Julolaelaps moseri which was collected from a millipede of family Spirostreptidae.

== Biological control ==
Several species of Laelapidae are used commercially as biological control agents of pests, and others are being studied for the same purpose. Examples include Gaeolaelaps aculeifer and Stratiolaelaps scimitus, used to control various pests in soil (thrips pupae, fly maggots, bulb mites), and pests of mushrooms (fungus gnats) and poultry (poultry red mite).

== Genera ==
- Aetholaelaps Strandtmann & Camin, 1956
- Alphalaelaps Radford, 1951
- Andreacarus Radford, 1953
- Androlaelaps Berlese, 1903
- Angosomaspis Costa, 1971
- Atricholaelaps Ewing, 1929
- Austrolaelaps Womersley, 1956
- Berlesia G.Canestrini, 1884
- Bewsiella Domrow, 1958
- Bisternalis Hunter, 1963
- Blaberolaelaps M. Costa, 1980
- Bolivilaelaps Fonseca, 1940
- Camerolaelaps Fonseca, 1960
- Cavilaelaps Fonseca, 1935
- Cerambylaelaps M.Costa, 1979
- Chalaza R. Domrow, 1990
- Chamolaelaps Hull, in F.Türk & S.Türk 1952
- Chapalania Hoffmann & Lopez-Campos, 1995
- Chelanyssus Zumpt & Till, 1953
- Chirolaelaps Heath, Bishop & Daniel, 1987
- Chrysochlorolaelaps Evans & Till, 1966
- Coleolaelaps Berlese, 1914
- Conolaelaps Womersley, 1959
- Cosmiphis Vitzthum, 1926
- Cyclolaelaps Ewing, 1933
- Cyclothorax von Frauenfeld, 1868
- Cypholaelaps Berlese, 1916
- Dianolaelaps Y. M. Gu & Q. X. Duan, 1990
- Dicrocheles Krantz & Khot, 1962
- Dinogamasus Kramer, 1898
- Dipolaelaps Zemskaya & Piontkovskaya, 1960
- Domrownyssus Evans & Till, 1966
- Donia Oudemans, 1939
- Dynastaspis Costa, 1971
- Dynatochela Keegan, 1950
- Dyscinetonyssus Moss & Funk, 1965
- Echinolaelaps Ewing, 1929
- Echinonyssus Hirst, 1925
- Ellsworthia Türk, 1945
- Eubrachylaelaps Ewing, 1929
- Eugynolaelaps Berlese, 1918
- Eumellitiphis Türk, 1948
- Euvarroa Delfinado & Baker, 1974
- Gaeolaelaps Evans & Till, 1966
- Gammaridacarus Canaris, 1962
- Garmania Nesbitt, 1951
- Gecarcinolaelaps Casanueva, 1993
- Geneiadolaelaps Ewing, 1929
- Gigantolaelaps Fonseca, 1939
- Gopriphis Berlese, 1910
- Halbertia Türk & Türk, 1952
- Hunteracarus Costa, 1975
- Hunteria Delfinado-Baker, Baker & Flechtmann, 1984
- Hyletastes Gistel, 1848
- Hymenolaelaps Furman, 1972
- Hypoaspis G.Canestrini, 1884
- Ichoronyssus Kolenati, 1858
- Iphiolaelaps Womersley, 1956
- Iphiopsis Berlese, 1882
- Jacobsonia Berlese, 1910
- Japanoasternolaelaps Hirschmann & Hiramatsu, 1984
- Jordensia Oudemans, 1937
- Julolaelaps Berlese, 1916
- Laelantennus Berlese, 1903
- Laelaps C.L.Koch, 1836
- Laelapsella Womersley, 1955
- Laelapsoides Willmann, 1952
- Laelaspoides Eickwort, 1966
- Laelaspulus Berlese, 1903
- Ligialaelaps Radford, 1942
- Liponysella Hirst, 1925
- Ljunghia Oudemans, 1932
- Longolaelaps Vitzthum, 1926
- Lucanaspis Costa, 1971
- Lukoschus Radovsky & Gettinger, 1999
- Mabuyonyssus Till, 1957
- Macrolaelaps Ewing, 1929
- Manisilaelaps Lavoipierre, 1956
- Meliponaspis Vitzthum, 1930
- Melittiphis Berlese, 1918
- Melittiphisoides Delfinado-Baker, Baker & Flechtmann, 1984
- Mesolaelaps Hirst, 1926
- Metaspinolaelaps Till, 1958
- Mungosicola Radford, 1942
- Myonyssoides Hirst, 1925
- Myonyssus Tiraboschi, 1904
- Myrmeciphis Hull, 1923
- Myrmolaelaps Trägårdh, 1906
- Myrmosleichus Berlese, 1903
- Myrmozercon Berlese, 1902
- Mysolaelaps Fonseca, 1935
- Nakhoda Domrow & Nadchatram, 1975
- Narceolaelaps J. B. Kethley, 1978
- Neoberlesia Berlese, 1892
- Neohypoaspis Delfinado-Baker, Baker & Roubik, 1983
- Neolaelaps Hirst, 1926
- Neoparalaelaps Fonseca, 1935
- Neospinolaelaps Zumpt & Patterson, 1952
- Notolaelaps Womersley, 1957
- Oloiphis Berlese, 1916
- Ondatralaelaps Evans & Till, 1965
- Ornitholaelaps Okereke, 1968
- Oryctolaelaps Lange, in Bregetova et al., 1955
- Parabisternalis Ueckermann & Loots, 1995
- Peramelaelaps Womersley, 1956
- Phytojacobsonia Vitzthum, 1925
- Pililaelaps Radford, 1947
- Pleisiolaelaps Womersley, 1957
- Pneumolaelaps Berlese, 1920
- Podolaelaps Berlese, 1888
- Praeparasitus Berlese, 1916
- Promacrolaelaps Costa, 1971
- Pseudolaelaps Berlese, 1916
- Pseudoparasitus Oudemans, 1902
- Qinghailaelaps Gu & Yang, 1984
- Radfordilaelaps Zumpt, 1949
- Raymentia Womersley, 1956
- Reticulolaelaps Costa, 1968
- Rhinolaelaps Fonseca, 1960
- Rhodacantha R. Domrow, 1979
- Rhyzolaelaps Bregetova & Grokhovskaya, 1961
- Scissuralaelaps Womersley, 1945
- Scolopendracarus Evans, 1955
- Scorpionyssus Fain & G. Rack, 1988
- Sinolaelaps Gu & Wang, 1979
- Sphaeroseius Berlese, 1904
- Stamfordia Trägårdh, 1906
- Steptolaelaps Furman, 1955
- Sternolaelaps Zumpt & Patterson, 1951
- Stevelus Hunter, 1963
- Stigmatolaelaps Krantz, 1998
- Stratiolaelaps Berlese, 1916
- Tengilaelaps Gu & Wang, 1996
- Tricholaelaps Vitzthum, 1926
- Tropilaelaps Delfinado & Baker, 1961
- Tur Baker & Wharton, 1952
- Turkiella Zumpt & Till, 1953
- Tylolaelaps Gu & Wang, 1979
- Ugandolaelaps Radford, 1942
- Uroiphis Berlese, 1903
- Urozercon Berlese, 1901
- Varroa Oudemans, 1904
- Xylocolaelaps Royce & Krantz, 2003
- Zontia Türk, 1948
- Zygolaelaps Tipton, 1957
