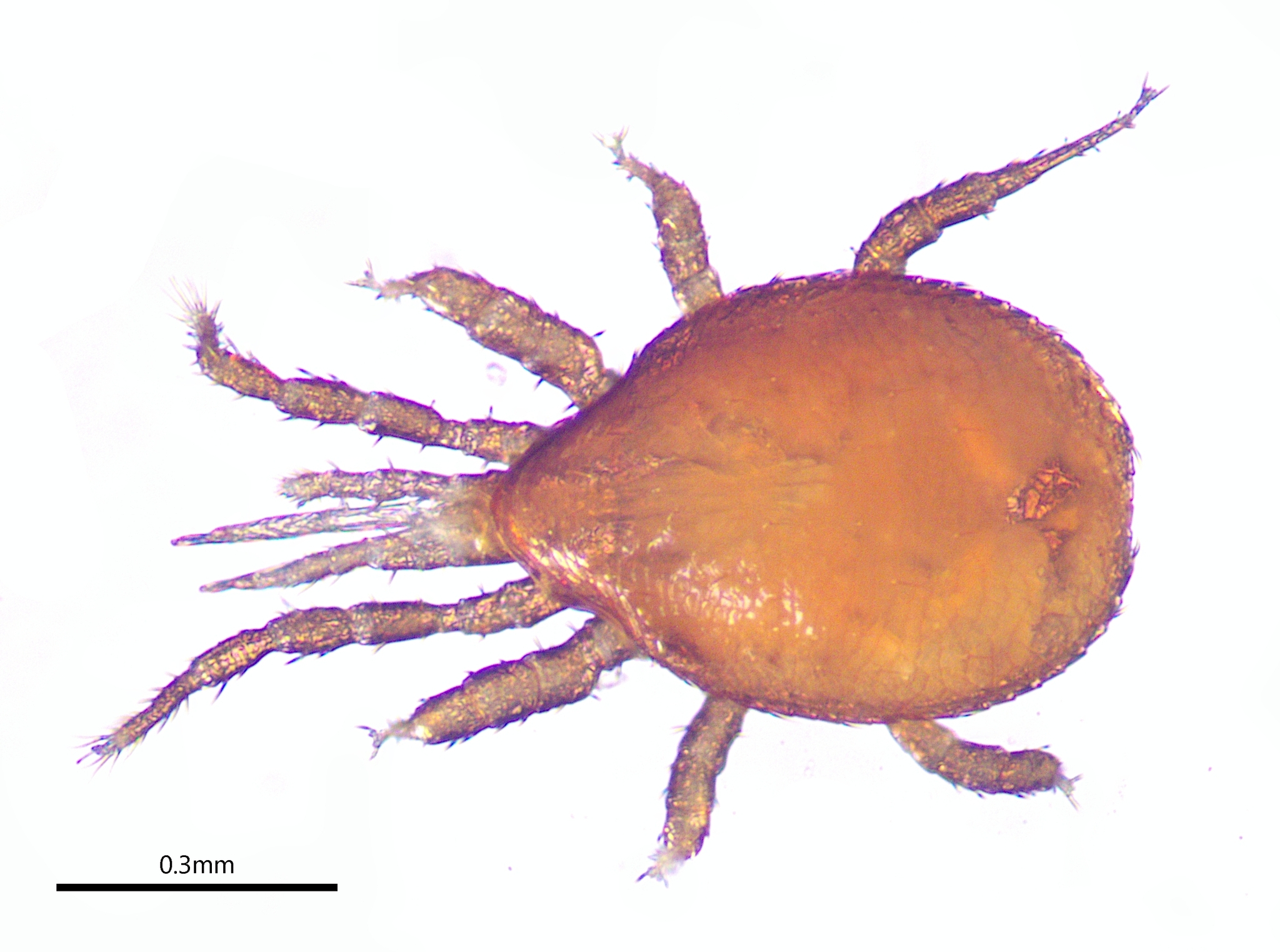

Scientific classification
- Kingdom: Animalia
- Phylum: Arthropoda
- Subphylum: Chelicerata
- Class: Arachnida
- Order: Mesostigmata
- Suborder: Monogynaspida
- Infraorder: Gamasina
- Superfamily: Eviphidoidea
- Family: Leptolaelapidae; Karg, 1978

Genera
- Australocheles W. Karg, 1983; Ayersacarus Hunter, 1964; Cosmetolaelaps Womersley, 1959; Evansolaelaps Marais & Loots, 1969; Indutolaelaps Karg, 1997; Leptolaelaps Berlese, 1918; Paradoxiphis Berlese, 1910; Prestacarus Clark in Clark & Hawke, 2012; Pseudopachylaelaps Evans, 1957; Pulchraplaga Karg, 1997; Stevacarus Hunter, 1970

= Leptolaelapidae =

Family of mites

Leptolaelapidae is a family of mites in the order Mesostigmata.

== Species ==
Australocheles Karg, 1983

- Australocheles holmi Karg, 1983

Ayersacarus Hunter, 1964

- Ayersacarus forsteri Clark, 2012
- Ayersacarus gelidus Hunter, 1964
- Ayersacarus gressitti Hunter, 1964
- Ayersacarus hurleyi Clark, 2012
- Ayersacarus knoxi Clark, 2012
- Ayersacarus plumapilus Hunter, 1964
- Ayersacarus savilli Clark, 2012
- Ayersacarus strandtmanni Hunter, 1964
- Ayersacarus woodi Clark, 2011

Cosmetolaelaps Womersley, 1959

- Cosmetolaelaps desecti Costa & Allsopp, 1981
- Cosmetolaelaps dolicacanthus (Canestrini, 1884)
- Cosmetolaelaps microsetus Costa & Allsopp, 1981
- Cosmetolaelaps oligosetus Costa & Allsopp, 1981
- Cosmetolaelaps reticulatus Costa & Allsopp, 1981
- Cosmetolaelaps wallacei Costa & Allsopp, 1981

Evansolaelaps Marais & Loots, 1969

- Evansolaelaps angolaensis Marais & Loots, 1969
- Evansolaelaps curtipilus Marais & Loots, 1969
- Evansolaelaps kabobensis Marais & Loots, 1969
- Evansolaelaps leleupi Marais & Loots, 1969
- Evansolaelaps lingulatus Marais & Loots, 1969
- Evansolaelaps punctissima Marais & Loots, 1969
- Evansolaelaps trisetosus Marais & Loots, 1969

Indutolaelaps Karg, 1997

- Indutolaelaps jiroftensis Hajizadeh et al, 2017
- Indutolaelaps squamosus Karg, 1997

Leptolaelaps Berlese, 1918

- Leptolaelaps capensis Evans, 1957
- Leptolaelaps elegans (Berlese, 1918)
- Leptolaelaps lambda Evans, 1957
- Leptolaelaps lawrencei Evans, 1957
- Leptolaelaps longicornea Karg, 1978
- Leptolaelaps macquariensis (Womersley, 1937)
- Leptolaelaps reticulatus Evans, 1957

Paradoxiphis Berlese, 1910

- Paradoxiphis armstrongi (Womersley, 1956)
- Paradoxiphis blackbolbi Costa & Allsopp, 1979
- Paradoxiphis bolboceras (Womersley, 1956)
- Paradoxiphis brevisetosus Costa & Allsopp, 1979
- Paradoxiphis brevisternum Costa & Allsopp, 1979
- Paradoxiphis circumsetosus Costa & Allsopp, 1979
- Paradoxiphis dimorphus Costa & Allsopp, 1979
- Paradoxiphis gigas Costa & Allsopp, 1979
- Paradoxiphis longanalis Costa & Allsopp, 1979
- Paradoxiphis longisetosus Costa & Allsopp, 1979
- Paradoxiphis matthewsi Costa & Allsopp, 1979
- Paradoxiphis rotundus Costa & Allsopp, 1979
- Paradoxiphis tenuibrachiatus Berlese, 1910
- Paradoxiphis waterhousei Costa & Allsopp, 1979
- Paradoxiphis womersleyi Costa & Allsopp, 1979

Prestacarus Clark in Clark & Hawke, 2012

- Prestacarus tilbrooki (Hunter, 1967)

Pseudopachylaelaps Evans, 1957

- Pseudopachylaelaps ornatus Evans, 1957

Pulchraplaga Karg, 1997

- Pulchraplaga caledonia Karg, 1997

Stevacarus Hunter, 1970

- Stevacarus claggi Hunter, 1970
- Stevacarus evansi (Hunter, 1964)
