= Australocheles =

Scientific classification
- Domain: Eukaryota
- Kingdom: Animalia
- Phylum: Arthropoda
- Subphylum: Chelicerata
- Class: Arachnida
- Order: Mesostigmata
- Family: Leptolaelapidae
- Genus: Australocheles; Karg, 1983
- Species: A. holmi

Binomial name
- Australocheles holmi Karg, 1983

Genus of mites

Australocheles is a genus of mites in the family Leptolaelapidae, first described by Wolfgang Karg in 1983. There is at least one described species in Australocheles, A. holmi.
