= Evansolaelaps =

Scientific classification
- Domain: Eukaryota
- Kingdom: Animalia
- Phylum: Arthropoda
- Subphylum: Chelicerata
- Class: Arachnida
- Order: Mesostigmata
- Family: Leptolaelapidae
- Genus: Evansolaelaps; Marais & Loots, 1969

Genus of mites

Evansolaelaps is a genus of mites in the family Leptolaelapidae.
