= Indutolaelaps =

Scientific classification
- Domain: Eukaryota
- Kingdom: Animalia
- Phylum: Arthropoda
- Subphylum: Chelicerata
- Class: Arachnida
- Order: Mesostigmata
- Family: Leptolaelapidae
- Genus: Indutolaelaps; Karg

Genus of mites

Indutolaelaps is a genus of mites in the family Leptolaelapidae. There are at least two described species in Indutolaelaps.

== Species ==
These two species belong to the genus Indutolaelaps:

- Indutolaelaps jiroftensis Hajizadeh, Mortazavi, Balooch-Shahriari & Castilho, 2017
- Indutolaelaps squamosus Karg, 1997
