= Pulchraplaga =

Scientific classification
- Domain: Eukaryota
- Kingdom: Animalia
- Phylum: Arthropoda
- Subphylum: Chelicerata
- Class: Arachnida
- Order: Mesostigmata
- Family: Leptolaelapidae
- Genus: Pulchraplaga; Karg, 1997
- Species: P. caledonia

Binomial name
- Pulchraplaga caledonia Karg, 1997

Genus of mites

Pulchraplaga is a genus of mites in the family Leptolaelapidae. There is at least one described species in Pulchraplaga, P. caledonia.
