= Pseudopachylaelaps =

Scientific classification
- Domain: Eukaryota
- Kingdom: Animalia
- Phylum: Arthropoda
- Subphylum: Chelicerata
- Class: Arachnida
- Order: Mesostigmata
- Family: Leptolaelapidae
- Genus: Pseudopachylaelaps; Evans, 1957
- Species: P. ornatus

Binomial name
- Pseudopachylaelaps ornatus Evans, 1957

Genus of mites

Pseudopachylaelaps is a genus of mites in the family Leptolaelapidae. There is at least one described species in Pseudopachylaelaps, P. ornatus.
