= Leptolaelaps =

Scientific classification
- Domain: Eukaryota
- Kingdom: Animalia
- Phylum: Arthropoda
- Subphylum: Chelicerata
- Class: Arachnida
- Order: Mesostigmata
- Family: Leptolaelapidae
- Genus: Leptolaelaps; Berlese, 1918

Genus of mites

Leptolaelaps is a genus of mites in the family Leptolaelapidae. There are about five described species in Leptolaelaps.

== Species ==
These five species belong to the genus Leptolaelaps:

- Leptolaelaps capensis Evans, 1957
- Leptolaelaps lambda Evans, 1957
- Leptolaelaps lawrencei Evans, 1957
- Leptolaelaps longicornea Karg, 1978
- Leptolaelaps reticulatus Evans, 1957
