= Paradoxiphis =

Scientific classification
- Domain: Eukaryota
- Kingdom: Animalia
- Phylum: Arthropoda
- Subphylum: Chelicerata
- Class: Arachnida
- Order: Mesostigmata
- Family: Leptolaelapidae
- Genus: Paradoxiphis; Berlese, 1910

Genus of mites

Paradoxiphis is a genus of mites in the family Leptolaelapidae.
