= Stevacarus =

Scientific classification
- Domain: Eukaryota
- Kingdom: Animalia
- Phylum: Arthropoda
- Subphylum: Chelicerata
- Class: Arachnida
- Order: Mesostigmata
- Family: Leptolaelapidae
- Genus: Stevacarus; Hunter, 1970

Genus of mites

Stevacarus is a genus of mites in the family Leptolaelapidae.
