= Ayersacarus =

Scientific classification
- Domain: Eukaryota
- Kingdom: Animalia
- Phylum: Arthropoda
- Subphylum: Chelicerata
- Class: Arachnida
- Order: Mesostigmata
- Family: Dermanyssidae
- Genus: Ayersacarus; Hunter, 1964

Genus of mites

Ayersacarus is a genus of mites in the family Dermanyssidae. There are about nine described species in Ayersacarus.

== Species ==
These nine species belong to the genus Ayersacarus:

- Ayersacarus forsteri Clark, 2012
- Ayersacarus gelidus Hunter, 1964
- Ayersacarus gressitti Hunter, 1964
- Ayersacarus hurleyi Clark, 2012
- Ayersacarus knoxi Clark, 2012
- Ayersacarus plumapilus Hunter, 1964
- Ayersacarus savilli Clark, 2012
- Ayersacarus strandtmanni Hunter, 1964
- Ayersacarus woodi Clark, 2011
