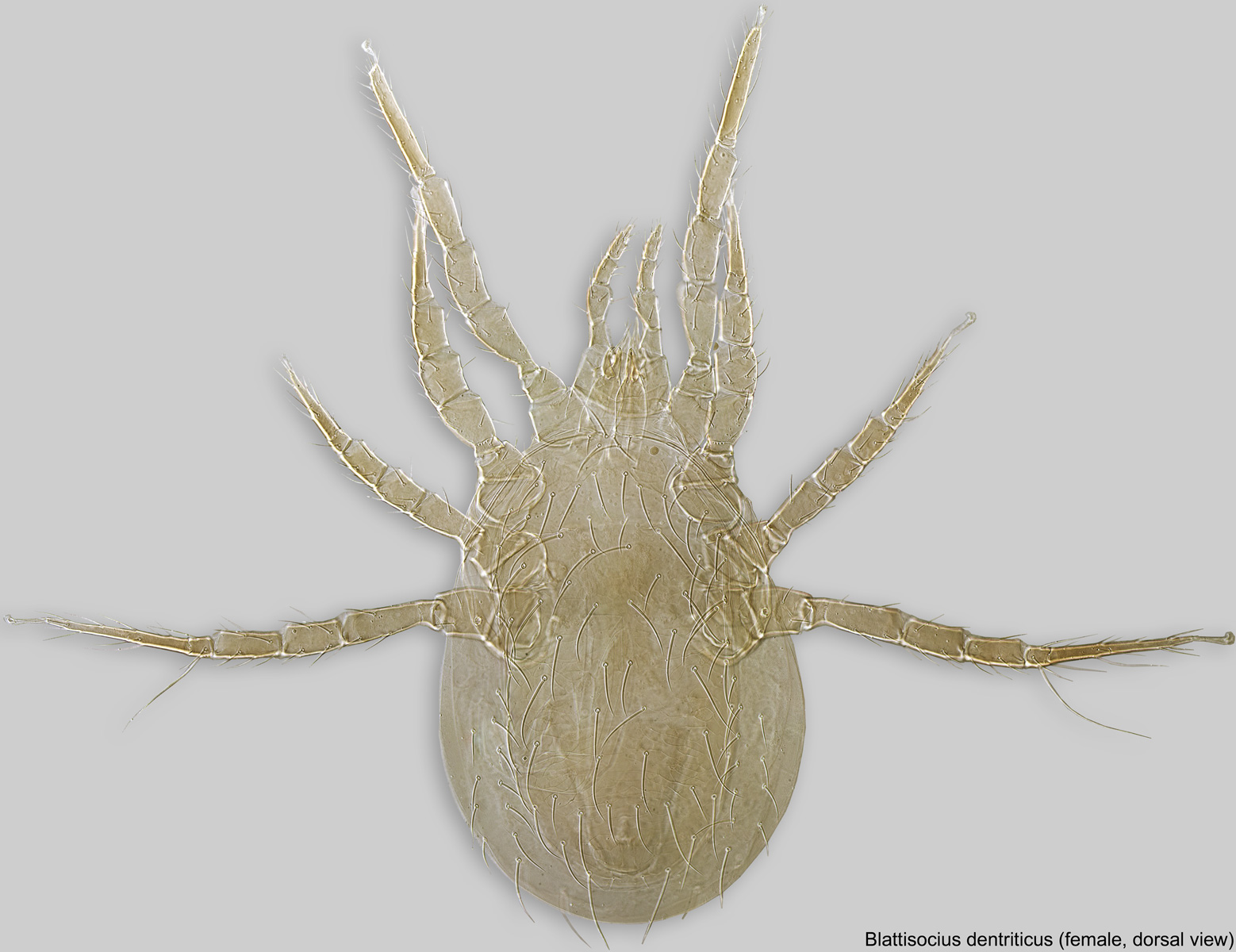
- Blattisocius dentriticus female

Scientific classification
- Kingdom: Animalia
- Phylum: Arthropoda
- Subphylum: Chelicerata
- Class: Arachnida
- Order: Mesostigmata
- Superfamily: Phytoseioidea
- Family: Blattisociidae; Garman, 1948

= Blattisociidae =

Family of mites

Blattisociidae is a family of mites in the order Mesostigmata.

== Description ==
Blattisociidae are mites with the following features: dorsal shield entire or laterally incised and with 18-43 pairs of setae; female with usually more than four pairs of marginal setae on soft cuticle; palptarsal apotele two-tined; fixed cheliceral digit with setiform pilus dentilis; peritreme usually extending from stigma at least to level of s2, and fused anteriorly with dorsal shield and broadly fused with exopodal shield beside coxa IV (except in Fungiseius clavulisetis); female spermathecal apparatus of the phytoseiid-type (except in Zercoseius); male spermatodactyl at least as long as movable cheliceral digit.

Mites of this family resemble those in Ascidae and Melicharidae, and historically these three families were all grouped together as Ascidae.

== Ecology ==
Blattisociidae in general are predators and fungivores, with some parasitic species. They occur in various habitats including humus, stored foods, insect nests, flowers and fungi.

Blattisociidae are known to engage in phoresis: attaching to larger animals to be carried to new habitats. Krantzoseius walteri adults live beneath the elytra of carabid beetles, Cheiroseius are phoretic on crane flies, and blattisociids associated with tropical flowers use hummingbirds.

== Zoogeography ==
The highest numbers of Blattisociidae species and of endemic species occur in the Neotropical region (South America), while the highest numbers of genera and of endemic genera occur in the Panamanian region (Central America and Caribbean islands). The family may have originated in one of these two neighbouring regions.

== Genera ==
As of 2016, this family contains the following 14 genera:

- Aceodromus Muma
- Adhaerenseius Loots & Theron
- Arrhenoseius Walter & Lindquist
- Blattisocius Keegan
- Cheiroseiulus Evans & Baker
- Cheiroseius Berlese
- Discoseius Lindquist & Moraza
- Fungiseius Moraza & Lindquist
- Hoploseius Berlese
- Krantzoseius Seeman
- Lasioseius Berlese
- Opilioseius Lindquist & Moraza
- Platyseius Berlese
- Zercoseius Berlese
