= Melicharidae =

Scientific classification
- Kingdom: Animalia
- Phylum: Arthropoda
- Subphylum: Chelicerata
- Class: Arachnida
- Order: Mesostigmata
- Superfamily: Ascoidea
- Family: Melicharidae

Family of mites

Melicharidae is a family of mites in the order Mesostigmata.

== Description ==
Melicharidae are mites characterized by: podonotal and opisthonotal shields usually fused; the third pair of sternal lyrifissures (iv3) situated off sternal shield (rarely absent) and usually on metasternal plates; peritrematic shield free posteriorly from, or narrowly fused with, exopodal shield beside coxa IV (except Orthadenella); fixed cheliceral digit usually with a hyaline lobe instead of a setiform pilus dentilis, and movable cheliceral digit usually with a pointed process (mucro) on mid-ventral face; genital shield usually gently rounded posteriorly; anal shield usually oval or elliptical, bearing only circumanal setae; and female spermathecal apparatus laelapid-type.

== Ecology ==
Melicharidae are free-living mites found in various habitats including soil, leaf litter, plants (e.g. bromeliads, pineapple flowers and false bird-of-paradise), rotten wood, stored products, seaweeds, animals, and the nests and excrement of animals. A large proportion of the family evolved to live on plants and these feed mostly on nectar and/or pollen. Other reported food items include nematodes, insect eggs and larvae, other mites and fungi.

Melicharids associated with animals may be phoretic on them. For example, species of genera Proctolaelaps, Rhinoseius and Tropicoseius are phoretic on hummingbirds.

Some species of Proctolaelaps are associated with bumblebees, though nothing else about their biology (e.g. how they feed) is known.

== Zoogeography ==
Melicharidae has more species in the Neotropical region (South America) than in anywhere else. This region also harbours the most endemic species of any region.

== Genera ==
As of 2016, 11 genera were recognised in this family.

- Melichares Hering
- Mucroseius Lindquist
- Mycolaelaps Lindquist
- Orolaelaps De Leon
- Orthadenella Athias-Henriot
- Proctogastrolaelaps McGraw & Farrier
- Proctolaelaps Berlese
- Rhinoseius Baker & Yunker
- Spadiseius Lindquist & Moraza
- Tropicoseius Baker & Yunker
- Xanthippe Naskrecki & Colwell
