= Ornithophily =

Pollination by birds

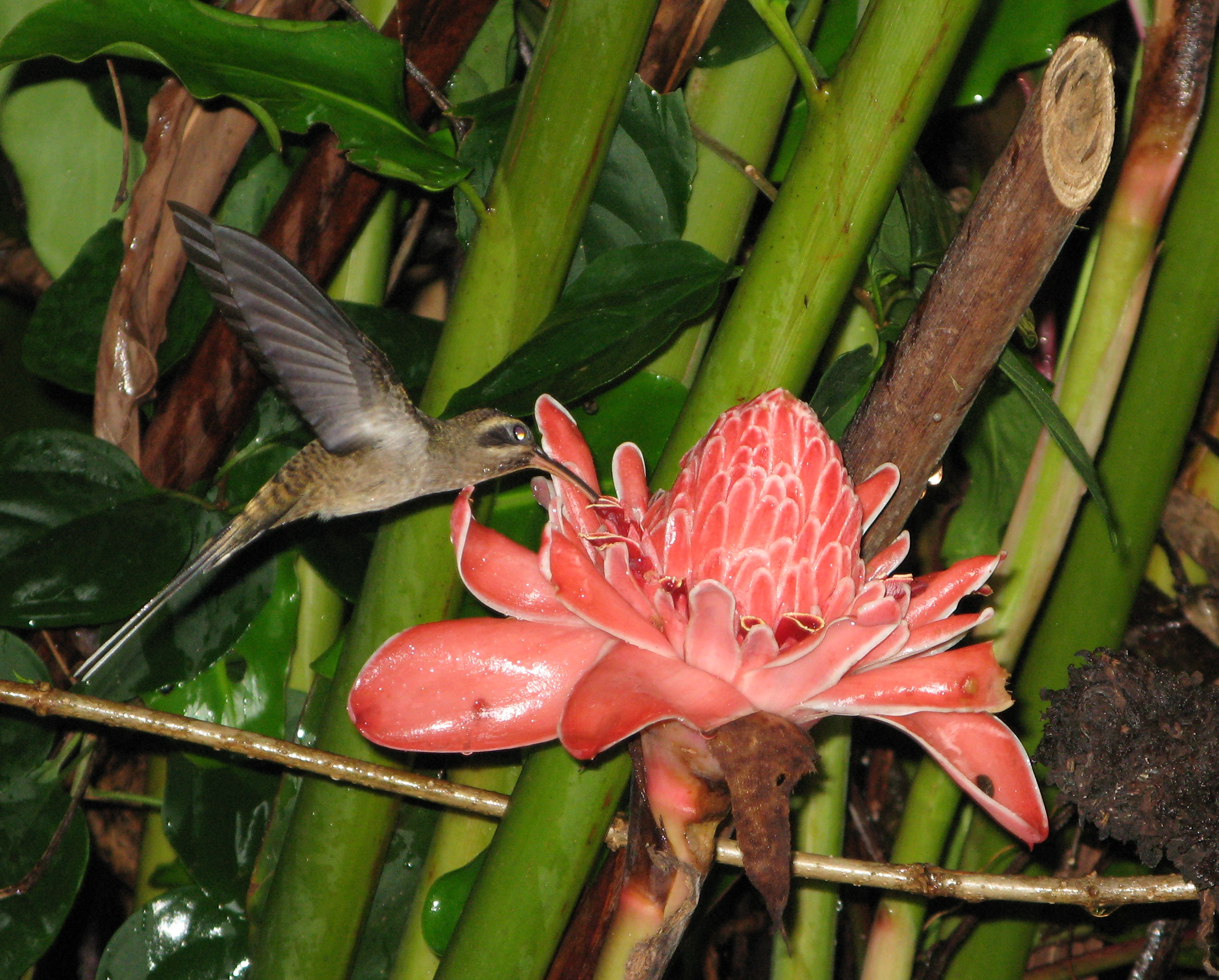
Hummingbird Phaethornis longirostris on an Etlingera inflorescence

Ornithophily or bird pollination is the pollination of flowering plants by birds. This sometimes (but not always) coevolutionary association is derived from insect pollination (entomophily) and is particularly well developed in some parts of the world, especially in the tropics, Southern Africa, and on some island chains. The association involves several distinctive plant adaptations forming a "pollination syndrome". The plants typically have colourful, often red, flowers with long tubular structures holding ample nectar and orientations of the stamen and stigma that ensure contact with the pollinator. Birds involved in ornithophily tend to be specialist nectarivores with brushy tongues and long bills, that are either capable of hovering flight or light enough to perch on the flower structures.

== Plant adaptations ==
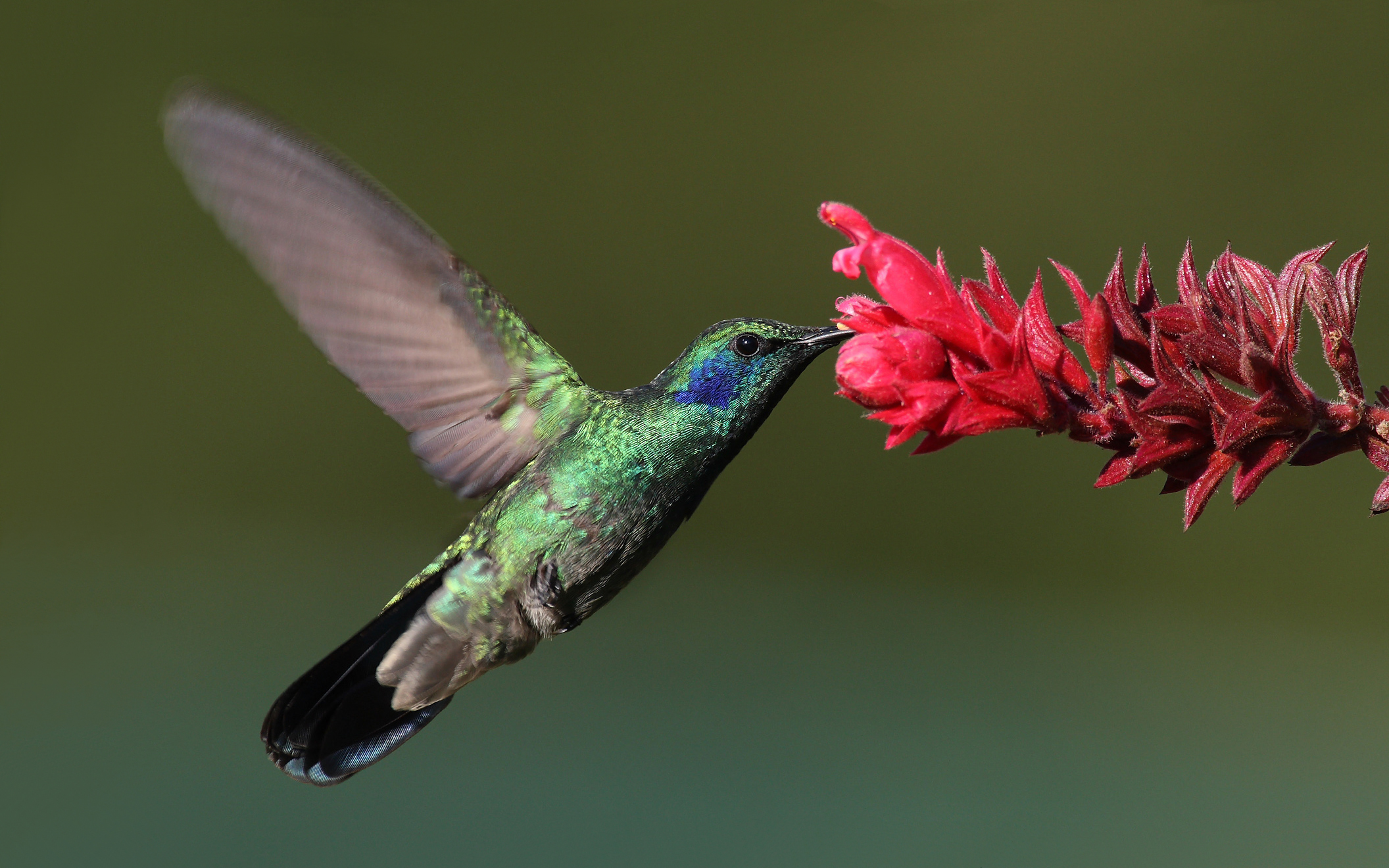
A lesser violetear

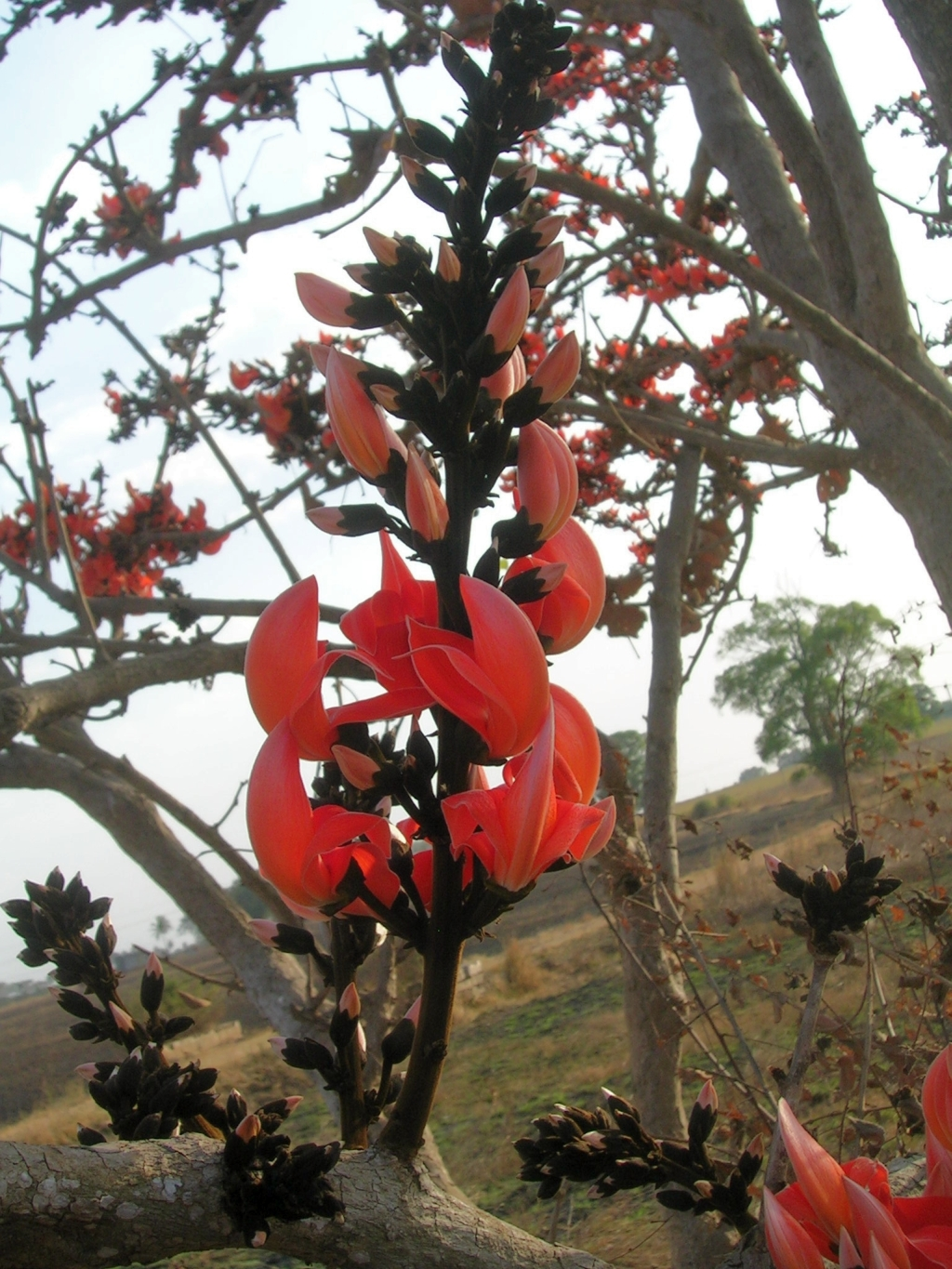
Inflorescences of Butea allow birds to perch on the stalk

Plant adaptations for ornithophily can be grouped primarily into those that attract and facilitate pollen transfer by birds, and those that exclude other groups, primarily insects, protecting against 'theft' of nectar and pollen. The ovules of bird flowers also tend to have adaptations that protect them from damage during vigorous foraging by hard bird bills.

One of the general adaptation patterns is the red flower color for many plant species. The pollinator, birds, are tetrachromats, and one type of the single cone has specific opsin to detect long-wavelength light (below about 600 nm). Therefore, birds have red photoreceptors and are sensitive to red color, and red flower colors can have a strong contrast with green leaf background. Better bird attraction is thus the primary reason behind the red color adaptation. Moreover, flowers of generalist bird-pollinated species from the New World have purer red colors than those from the Old World, which often have a secondary reflectance peak around shorter-wavelength region. The secondary peak reduces the contrast of red color with the background and the avoidance of insects (higher risk of nectar robbing), decreasing the efficiency of pollination.

The flowers of generalist bird-pollinated plant species differ from those pollinated by specialized birds, such as hummingbirds or sunbirds by lacking long corolla tubes and having brush-like, exserted stamens. Most bird pollinated flowers are red and have a lot of nectar. They also tend to be unscented. Flowers with generalist pollinators tend to have dilute nectar but those that have specialist pollinators such as hummingbirds or sunbirds tend to have more concentrated nectar. The nectar of ornithophilous flowers vary in the sugar composition, with hexoses being high in passerine pollinated species while those that are insect pollinated tend to be sucrose rich. Hummingbird pollinated flowers however tend to be sucrose rich.

Different plants have also developed specific adaptations for bird pollination. Many plants of the family Loranthaceae have explosive flowers that shower pollen on a bird that forages near it. They are associated mainly with flowerpeckers in the family Dicaeidae. In Australia, some species of Banksia have flowers that open in response to bird actions thereby reducing the wastage of pollen. In tropical dry forests in southern India, ornithophilous flowers were found to bloom mainly in the hot dry season. Calceolaria uniflora, a species of Scrophularaceae from South America, has a special fleshy appendage on the lower lip of the flower that is rich in sugar. This is fed on by the least seedsnipe (Thinocorus rumicivorus) and in the process the birds brush pollen onto their head and transfer them to other flowers.

The rat's tail babiana (Babiana ringens) produces a strong stalk within the inflorescence that serves as a perch for the malachite sunbird as it visits the flower. Heliconias have special sticky threads that help in the adhesion of pollen to smooth structures such as the bill of a hummingbird. Some African orchids of the genus Disa have pollinaria that stick to the feet of visiting sunbirds.

Plants need to protect against nectar and pollen being taken by non-pollinators. Such animals are sometimes classified as thieves, which simply remove resources without pollinating, and robbers, which damage the flower to access resources. Flowers specialized for pollination by long-billed birds may be especially vulnerable to theft. For example, some bees and birds that cannot reach down the long tubes of bird pollinated flowers simply pierce the flower at the base to obtain nectar, without pollinating.

== Bird adaptations ==
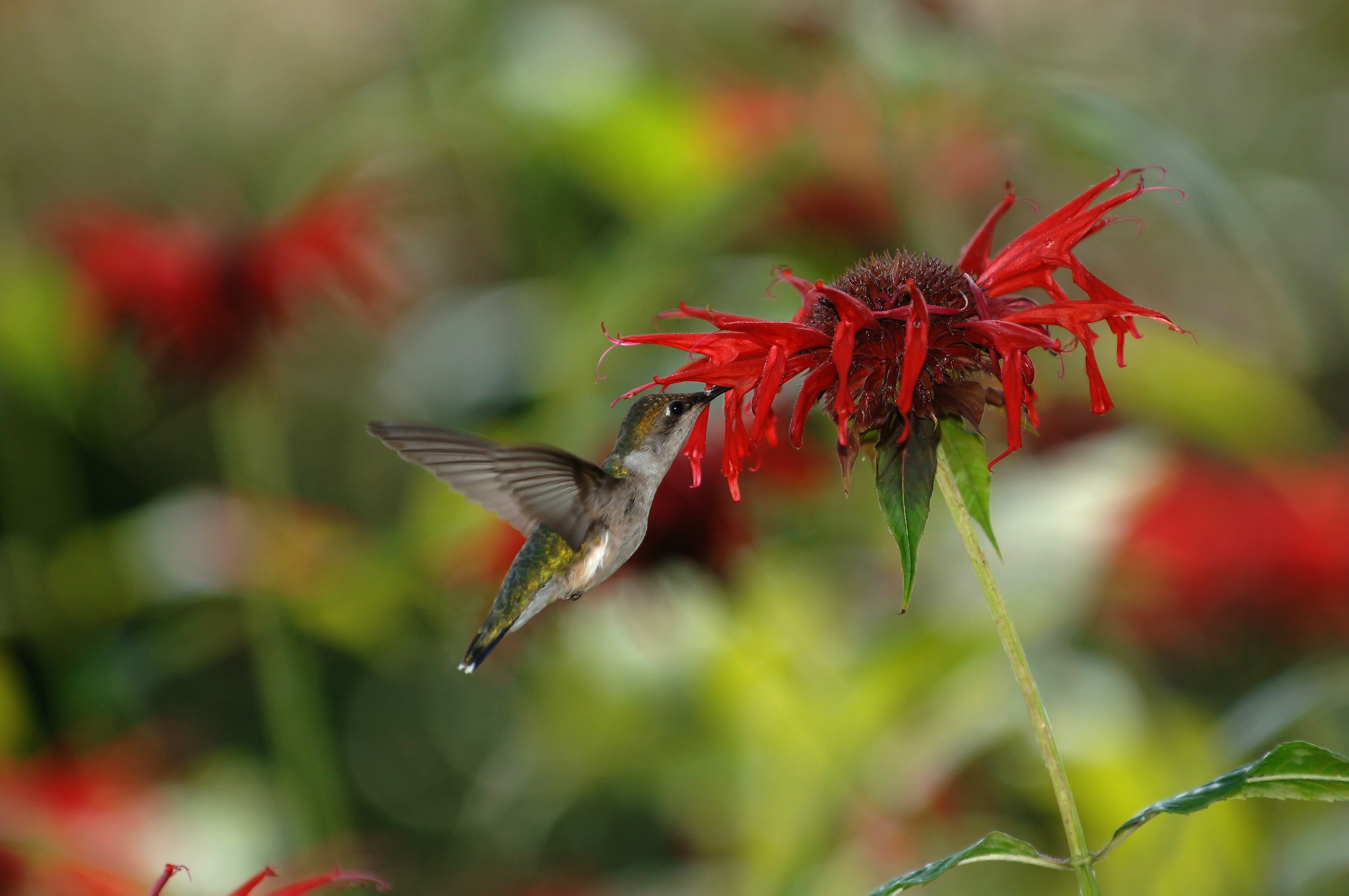
Ruby-throated hummingbird (Archilochus colubris) at scarlet beebalm flowers (Monarda didyma)

The main families of specialized nectar feeding birds that are involved in ornithophily are the hummingbirds (Trochilidae), sunbirds (Nectariniidae), and the honey-eaters (Meliphagidae). Other important bird groups include those in the families the Icteridae, the honeycreepers (Thraupidae, Carduelinae), white-eyes (Zosteropidae) and the South African sugar-birds (Promeropidae). Birds may obtain nectar either by perching or by hovering with the latter mainly found in the hummingbirds and sunbirds. Within the hummingbirds, two kinds of foraging are noted with non-territorial "hermit" hummingbirds which forage longer distances and the territorial non-hermits.

Hummingbirds have the ability to digest sucrose unlike many passerines that prefer hexoses (fructose and glucose). Starlings and their relatives will completely avoid sucrose. Nectar feeding birds typically have a mechanism to quickly excrete excess water. They may have to drink four to five times their body mass of liquid during the day to obtain enough energy. Hummingbirds are capable of excreting nitrogenous wastes as ammonia since they can afford more water loss than birds that feed on low-moisture food sources. Hummingbirds and sunbirds also have special anatomical and physiological adaptations that allow them to quickly excrete excess water. Hummingbirds are also able to turn off their kidney function at night.

In some birds such as white-eyes, the pollen dusted by the plants on the forehead of the birds may increase the wear of these feathers leading to increased moulting and replacement.

== Patterns in the evolution of ornithophily ==
Coevolution is the influence of closely associated species on each other in their evolution. Key - 1: Two different species of flower allow hummingbirds with both short and long beaks to thrive. 2: The red flower species goes extinct, causing the short-beaked birds to lose their food source, because they can’t feed on the bigger flowers. 3: The short-beaked hummingbirds are less fit, and die out, leaving only long-beaked hummingbirds.

About 7000 neotropical plant species are hummingbird-pollinated in contrast to about 129 species of North American plants that have evolved ornithophilous associations. Nearly a fourth of the 900 species of the genus Salvia are bird-pollinated in Central and South America and a few also occur in South Africa. Tropical China and the adjacent Indochinese countries harbor relatively few bird-pollinated flowers, among them is Rhodoleia championii, a member of the family Hamamelidaceae, which at any one site can be visited and pollinated by up to seven species of nectar-foraging birds, including Japanese white-eyes (Zosterops japonicus, Zosteropidae) and fork-tailed sunbirds (Aethopyga christinae, Nectariniidae).

Hummingbirds rely on nectar for energy, and ornithophilous flowers need hummingbirds’ assistance with pollination in order to reproduce. While the birds are feeding, pollen sticks to their beaks, which will rub off on the next flower they visit, pollinating it. Over time, the co-dependence on one another causes the co-evolution of pollination syndromes. For example, different species of hummingbirds have differently shaped beaks, presumably to allow them to drink nectar from the flowers around them. It is widely believed that short-billed hummingbirds drink from wider flowers with short petals, and hummingbirds with longer bills have close relationships with flowers with long, narrow corollas. Most of the time, long-billed species have access to both short and long flowers, but they often avoid short flowers to avoid competition. Further, hummingbirds with curved bills will forage at straight-petaled flowers, but straight-billed birds are less likely to visit curved flowers. Ornithophilous flowers pollinated by hummingbirds often have reproductive structures that are vertically oriented. This creates a favorable upright body position for hummingbirds during feeding, one that allows them to sufficiently flap their wings for hovering. Hummingbirds prefer to visit larger and taller floral displays, and it has been proven and confirmed through many studies that birds prefer flowers with red or pink petals over other colors.

Bird pollination is considered as a costly strategy for plants and it evolves only where there are particular benefits for the plant. High altitude ecosystems that lack insect pollinators, those in dry regions or isolated islands tend to favour the evolution of ornithophily, most by specialized nectarivorous birds, such as hummingbirds or sunbirds. Plants pollinated by generalist birds are most diverse in tropical and subtropical lowlands with a pronounced climatic seasonality. These plants are mostly large, woody species that produce a large number of open flowers at the same time in contrast to the mostly small shrubs and herbs that are pollinated by specialized nectarivorous birds. Since generalist bird-pollinated plants are mostly self-incompatible they needed to adapt to pollinators that mostly provide outcrossing, such as generalist birds. These birds mostly feed on arthropods, fruits or seeds even if much nectar is available and therefore move a lot through the forest. By this activity they often move between nectar-providing plants and provide outcrossing. Generalist bird-pollinated plants even evolved deterring mechanisms against specialized nectarivorous birds and bees since these groups tend to establish feeding territories within one tree and thus most conduct self-pollination.

On islands however, generalist bird pollination did not evolve to avoid self-pollination but adapted to a reliable pollinator since bees and butterflies are rare just as on montane forests.

== Migration and flowering synchrony ==
Time of flowering is often used to mark the start of spring in temperate climate zones. Recently, studies have consistently found that plants respond to increasing temperatures by flowering earlier. Strong coevolution between hummingbirds and flowers has led to an adaptive specialization outcome in which important behaviors of both hummingbirds and flowers become synchronized. Because hummingbirds depend heavily on nectar, it is very possible that their migration is correlated with the time of flowering of flower species. For specialist hummingbird species, flowering phenology is extremely important for survival during and following fall migration. For example, the migratory route of the S. rufus is linked to the florescence of a unique collection of flower species. S. rufus prefer S. iodantha flowers. Studies have found that the presence of S. rufus is coupled with the flowering of S. iodantha in specific locations. Time of flowering is therefore significant for the survival of S. rufus during fall migration. Similarly, peak flowering of Impatiens capensis flowers corresponds to the peak migration time of the Ruby-Throated Hummingbird.

== Other associations ==
Several mite species (mainly in the genera Proctolaelaps, Tropicoseius and Rhinoseius, family Ascidae) have evolved a phoretic mode of life, climbing into the nostrils of hummingbirds that visit flowers and hitching a ride to other flowers where they can feed on the nectar. Hummingbird flower mites favour plants in the families of Heliconiaceae, Costaceae, Zingiberaceae, Amaryllidaceae, Rubiaceae, Apocynaceae, Bromeliaceae, Gesneriaceae, Lobeliaceae and Ericaceae, members of which are associated with hummingbirds.

== See also ==
- Zoophily (pollination by vertebrates)
