= Ascoidea =

Ascoidea may refer to:

- Ascoidea (fungus), a genus of fungi in the family Ascoideaceae
- Ascoidea (mite), a superfamily of mites in the order Mesostigmata
