= Arctoseius euventralis =

Scientific classification
- Domain: Eukaryota
- Kingdom: Animalia
- Phylum: Arthropoda
- Subphylum: Chelicerata
- Class: Arachnida
- Order: Mesostigmata
- Family: Ascidae
- Genus: Arctoseius
- Species: A. euventralis

Binomial name
- Arctoseius euventralis Karg, 1998

Species of mite

Arctoseius euventralis is a species of mite in the family Ascidae.
