= Arctoseius austriacus =

Scientific classification
- Domain: Eukaryota
- Kingdom: Animalia
- Phylum: Arthropoda
- Subphylum: Chelicerata
- Class: Arachnida
- Order: Mesostigmata
- Family: Ascidae
- Genus: Arctoseius
- Species: A. austriacus

Binomial name
- Arctoseius austriacus Willmann, 1949

Species of mite

Arctoseius austriacus is a species of mite in the family Ascidae.
