= Arctoseius venustulus =

Scientific classification
- Domain: Eukaryota
- Kingdom: Animalia
- Phylum: Arthropoda
- Subphylum: Chelicerata
- Class: Arachnida
- Order: Mesostigmata
- Family: Ascidae
- Genus: Arctoseius
- Species: A. venustulus

Binomial name
- Arctoseius venustulus (Berlese, 1917)

Species of mite

Arctoseius venustulus is a species of mite in the family Ascidae.
