= Arctoseius cetratus =

Scientific classification
- Domain: Eukaryota
- Kingdom: Animalia
- Phylum: Arthropoda
- Subphylum: Chelicerata
- Class: Arachnida
- Order: Mesostigmata
- Family: Ascidae
- Genus: Arctoseius
- Species: A. cetratus

Binomial name
- Arctoseius cetratus (Sellnick, 1940)

Species of mite

Arctoseius cetratus is a species of mite in the family Ascidae.
