= Arctoseius tschernovi =

Scientific classification
- Domain: Eukaryota
- Kingdom: Animalia
- Phylum: Arthropoda
- Subphylum: Chelicerata
- Class: Arachnida
- Order: Mesostigmata
- Family: Ascidae
- Genus: Arctoseius
- Species: A. tschernovi

Binomial name
- Arctoseius tschernovi Makarova, 2000

Species of mite

Arctoseius tschernovi is a species of mite in the family Ascidae. It is found in Europe.
