= Hyatella =

Hyatella or Hyattella may refer to:

- Hyattella (sponge), a genus of sponges in the family Spongiidae
- Hyatella, a genus of arachnid in the family Ascidae, synonym of Lasioseius
- Hyatella, a genus of bivalves in the family Hiatellidae, synonym of Hiatella
