= Arctoseius kolymensis =

Scientific classification
- Kingdom: Animalia
- Phylum: Arthropoda
- Subphylum: Chelicerata
- Class: Arachnida
- Order: Mesostigmata
- Family: Ascidae
- Genus: Arctoseius
- Species: A. kolymensis

Binomial name
- Arctoseius kolymensis Makarova & Petrova, 1992

Species of mite

Arctoseius kolymensis is a species of mite in the family Ascidae.
