= Arctoseius minutus =

Scientific classification
- Domain: Eukaryota
- Kingdom: Animalia
- Phylum: Arthropoda
- Subphylum: Chelicerata
- Class: Arachnida
- Order: Mesostigmata
- Family: Ascidae
- Genus: Arctoseius
- Species: A. minutus

Binomial name
- Arctoseius minutus (Halbert, 1915)

Species of mite

Arctoseius minutus is a species of mite in the family Ascidae. It is found in Europe.
