= Arctopsis =

Scientific classification
- Domain: Eukaryota
- Kingdom: Animalia
- Phylum: Arthropoda
- Subphylum: Chelicerata
- Class: Arachnida
- Order: Mesostigmata
- Family: Ascidae
- Genus: Arctopsis; Athias-Henriot, 1973

Genus of mites

Arctopsis is a genus of mites in the family Ascidae.

== Species ==
- Arctopsis inexpectatus Athias-Henriot, 1973
