= Anephiasca castrii =

Scientific classification
- Kingdom: Animalia
- Phylum: Arthropoda
- Subphylum: Chelicerata
- Class: Arachnida
- Order: Mesostigmata
- Family: Ascidae
- Genus: Anephiasca
- Species: A. castrii

Binomial name
- Anephiasca castrii Athias-Henriot, 1969

Species of mite

Anephiasca castrii is a species of mite in the family Ascidae.
