= Laelaptoseius =

Scientific classification
- Kingdom: Animalia
- Phylum: Arthropoda
- Subphylum: Chelicerata
- Class: Arachnida
- Order: Mesostigmata
- Family: Ascidae
- Genus: Laelaptoseius; Womersley, 1960

Genus of mites

Laelaptoseius is a monotypic genus of mites in the family Ascidae, endemic to New Zealand. The sole species is Laelaptoseius novaezelandiae.
