= Gamasellodes =

Scientific classification
- Kingdom: Animalia
- Phylum: Arthropoda
- Subphylum: Chelicerata
- Class: Arachnida
- Order: Mesostigmata
- Family: Ascidae
- Genus: Gamasellodes; Athias-Henriot, 1961

Genus of mites

Gamasellodes is a genus of mites in the family Ascidae.

== Species ==
- Gamasellodes adrianae Walter, 2003
- Gamasellodes andhraensis Bhattacharyya, 2003
- Gamasellodes bicolor (Berlese, 1918)
- Gamasellodes claudiae Walter, 2003
- Gamasellodes ericae Walter, 2003
- Gamasellodes hildae Jordaan, 1988
- Gamasellodes islandicus Bhattacharyya & Sanyal, 2003
- Gamasellodes plaire Halliday, Walter & Lindquist, 1998
- Gamasellodes spinosus Bhattacharyya & Sanyal, 2003
- Gamasellodes sternalis Bhattacharyya & Sanyal, 2002
- Gamasellodes vermivorax Walter, 1987
- Gamasellodes vulgatior Athias-Henriot, 1961
