= Protogamasellus =

Scientific classification
- Kingdom: Animalia
- Phylum: Arthropoda
- Subphylum: Chelicerata
- Class: Arachnida
- Order: Mesostigmata
- Family: Ascidae
- Genus: Protogamasellus; Karg, 1962

Genus of mites

Protogamasellus is a genus of mites in the family Ascidae.

== Species ==
- Protogamasellus angustiventris (Athias Henriot, 1961)
- Protogamasellus ascleronodulus Shcherbak & Petrova, 1987
- Protogamasellus biscleronodulus Shcherbak & Petrova, 1987
- Protogamasellus cognatus (Athias Henriot, 1961)
- Protogamasellus elongatus Shcherbak & Petrova, 1987
- Protogamasellus evansi (Karg, 2000)
- Protogamasellus hibernicus Evans, 1982
- Protogamasellus indica Bhattacharyya, Sanyal & Bhattacharya, 2000
- Protogamasellus keralaensis Bhattacharyya, Sanyal & Bhattacharya, 2000
- Protogamasellus longipellis (Karg, 2000)
- Protogamasellus massula (Athias Henriot, 1961)
- Protogamasellus mica (Athias Henriot, 1961)
- Protogamasellus minimus Jordaan, 1988
- Protogamasellus minor
- Protogamasellus paradioscorus Nasr, Afifi & Hassan, 1988
- Protogamasellus primitivus Karg, 1962
- Protogamasellus scuticalis Genis, Loots & Ryke, 1967
- Protogamasellus similiscuticalis Bhattacharyya, Sanyal & Bhattacharya, 2000
- Protogamasellus singularis (Karg, 1962)
- Protogamasellus sternalis Nasr, Afifi & Hassan, 1988
