= Ectoantennoseius =

Scientific classification
- Kingdom: Animalia
- Phylum: Arthropoda
- Subphylum: Chelicerata
- Class: Arachnida
- Order: Mesostigmata
- Family: Ascidae
- Genus: Ectoantennoseius; Walter, 1998

Genus of mites

Ectoantennoseius is a genus of mites in the family Ascidae.

== Species ==
- Ectoantennoseius kitchingi Walter, 1998
