= Neojordensia =

Scientific classification
- Kingdom: Animalia
- Phylum: Arthropoda
- Subphylum: Chelicerata
- Class: Arachnida
- Order: Mesostigmata
- Family: Ascidae
- Genus: Neojordensia; Evans, 1957

Genus of mites

Neojordensia is a genus of mites in the family Ascidae.

== Species ==
- Neojordensia asetosa Kandil, 1979
- Neojordensia lativentris Karg, 1982
- Neojordensia lawrencei (Evans, 1957)
- Neojordensia levis (Oudemans & Voigts, 1904)
