= Africoseius =

Scientific classification
- Kingdom: Animalia
- Phylum: Arthropoda
- Subphylum: Chelicerata
- Class: Arachnida
- Order: Mesostigmata
- Family: Ascidae
- Genus: Africoseius; Krantz, 1962

Genus of mites

Africoseius is a genus of mites in the family Ascidae.

== Species ==
- Africoseius areolatus Krantz, 1962
