= Paraproctolaelaps =

Scientific classification
- Kingdom: Animalia
- Phylum: Arthropoda
- Subphylum: Chelicerata
- Class: Arachnida
- Order: Mesostigmata
- Family: Ascidae
- Genus: Paraproctolaelaps; Bregetova, 1977

Genus of mites

Paraproctolaelaps is a genus of mites in the family Ascidae.

== Species ==
- Paraproctolaelaps zhongweiensis Bai & Gu, 1994
