= Blattisocius dentriticus =

Scientific classification
- Domain: Eukaryota
- Kingdom: Animalia
- Phylum: Arthropoda
- Subphylum: Chelicerata
- Class: Arachnida
- Order: Mesostigmata
- Family: Blattisociidae
- Genus: Blattisocius
- Species: B. dentriticus

Binomial name
- Blattisocius dentriticus (Berlese, 1918)

Species of mite

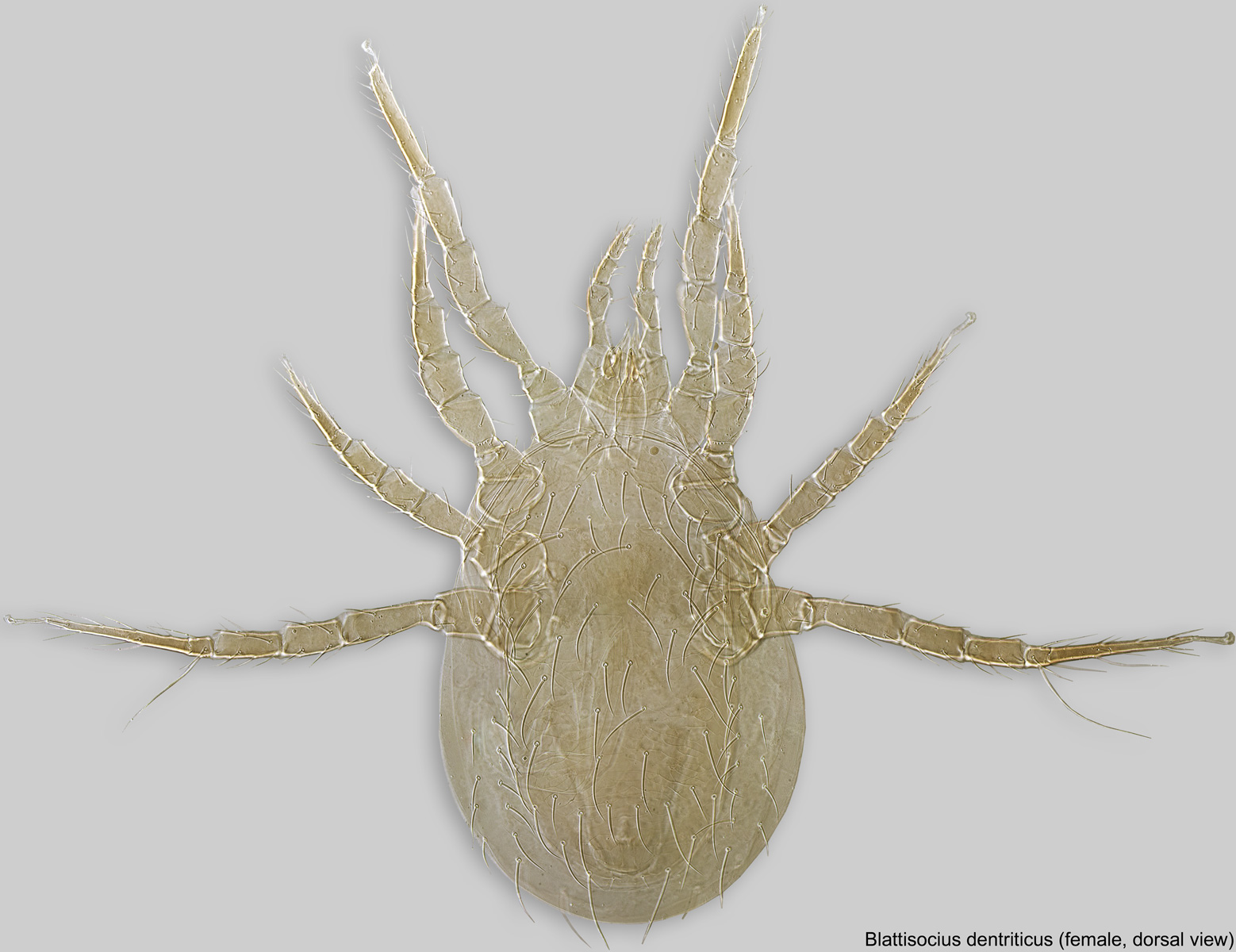
Blattisocius dentriticus female

Blattisocius dentriticus is a species of mites in the family Blattisociidae. It was described by Berlese in 1918.
