= Rettenmeyerius =

Scientific classification
- Kingdom: Animalia
- Phylum: Arthropoda
- Subphylum: Chelicerata
- Class: Arachnida
- Order: Mesostigmata
- Family: Ascidae
- Genus: Rettenmeyerius; Elzinga, 1998

Genus of mites

Rettenmeyerius is a genus of mites in the family Ascidae.

== Species ==
- Rettenmeyerius agnesae Elzinga, 1998
- Rettenmeyerius carli Elzinga, 1998
- Rettenmeyerius marianae Elzinga, 1998
- Rettenmeyerius plaumanni Elzinga, 1998
- Rettenmeyerius schneirlai Elzinga, 1998
