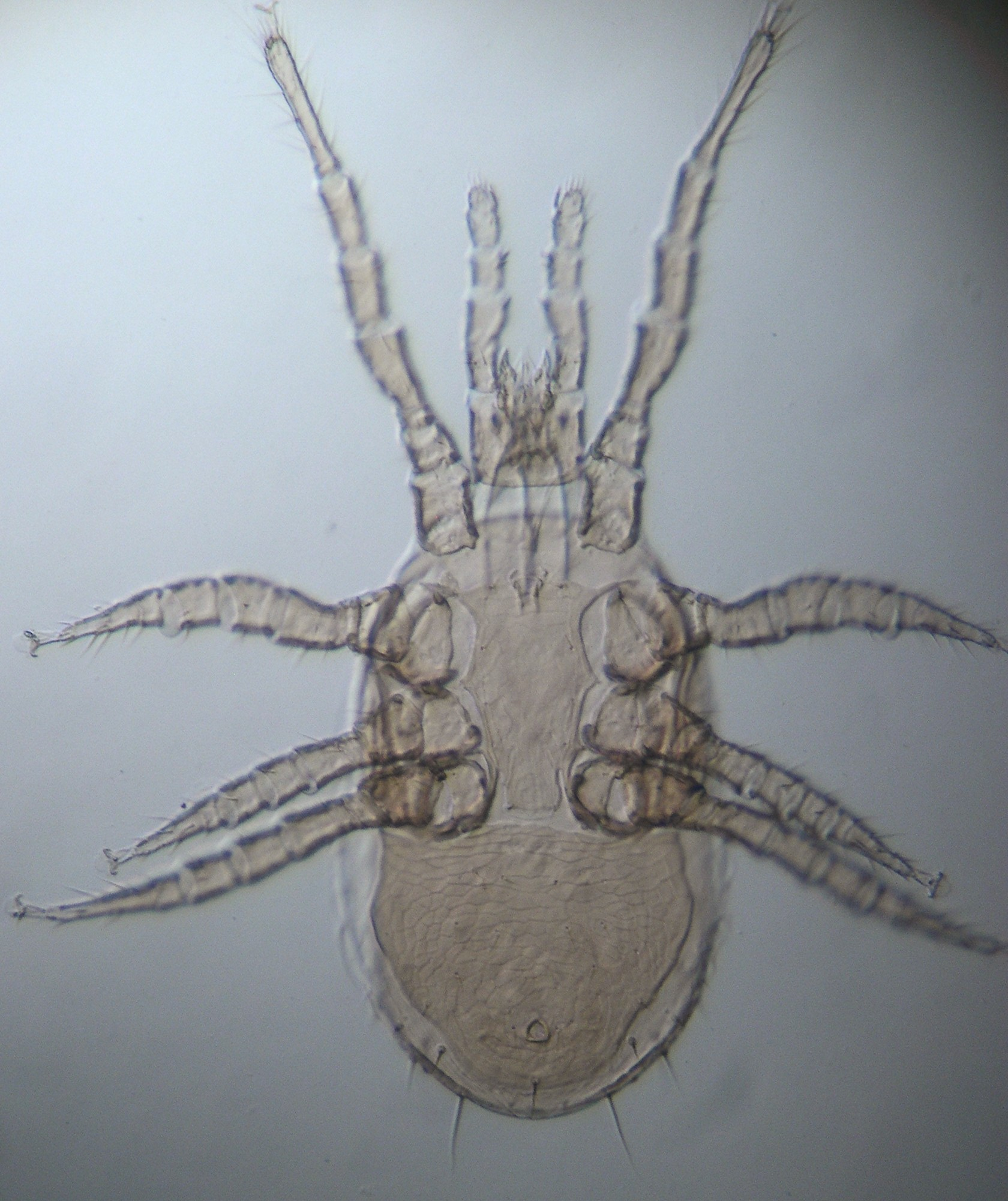
- Arctoseius magnanalis

Scientific classification
- Domain: Eukaryota
- Kingdom: Animalia
- Phylum: Arthropoda
- Subphylum: Chelicerata
- Class: Arachnida
- Order: Mesostigmata
- Family: Ascidae
- Genus: Arctoseius; Thor, 1930

= Arctoseius =

Genus of mites

Arctoseius is a genus of mites in the family Ascidae.

== Species ==
- Arctoseius austriacus Willmann, 1949
- Arctoseius babenkoi Makarova, 2000
- Arctoseius cetratus Sellnick, 1940
- Arctoseius eremita (Berlese, 1918)
- Arctoseius euventralis Karg, 1998
- Arctoseius ibericus Willmann, 1949
- Arctoseius kolymensis Makarova & Petrova, 1992
- Arctoseius lateroincisus Thor, 1930
- Arctoseius latoanalis Karg, 1998
- Arctoseius magnanalis Evans, 1958
- Arctoseius memnon Halliday, Walter & Lindquist, 1998
- Arctoseius minutus (Halbert, 1915)
- Arctoseius miranalis Makarova, 2000
- Arctoseius nikolskyi Makarova & Petrova, 1992
- Arctoseius productus Makarova, 2000
- Arctoseius semiscissus (Berlese, 1892)
- Arctoseius tajmyricus Petrova & Makarova, 1991
- Arctoseius tschernovi Makarova, 2000
- Arctoseius venustulus (Berlese, 1916)
