= Xenoseius =

Scientific classification
- Kingdom: Animalia
- Phylum: Arthropoda
- Subphylum: Chelicerata
- Class: Arachnida
- Order: Mesostigmata
- Family: Ascidae
- Genus: Xenoseius; Lindquist & Evans, 1965

Genus of mites

Xenoseius is a genus of mites in the family Ascidae.

== Species ==
- Xenoseius clayi (Evans & Hyatt, 1960)
- Xenoseius elizae Halliday, Walter & Lindquist, 1998
