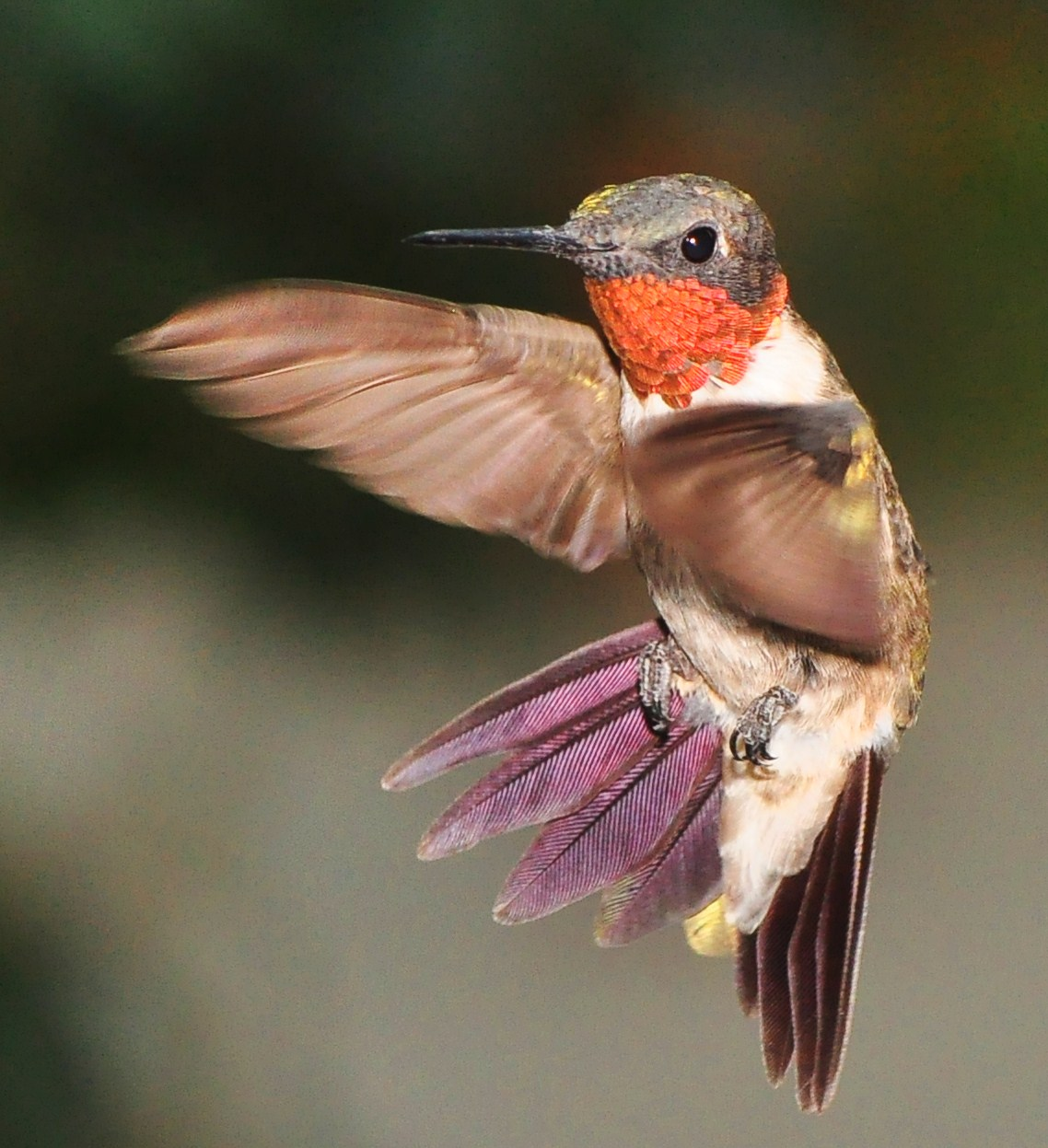
- Male
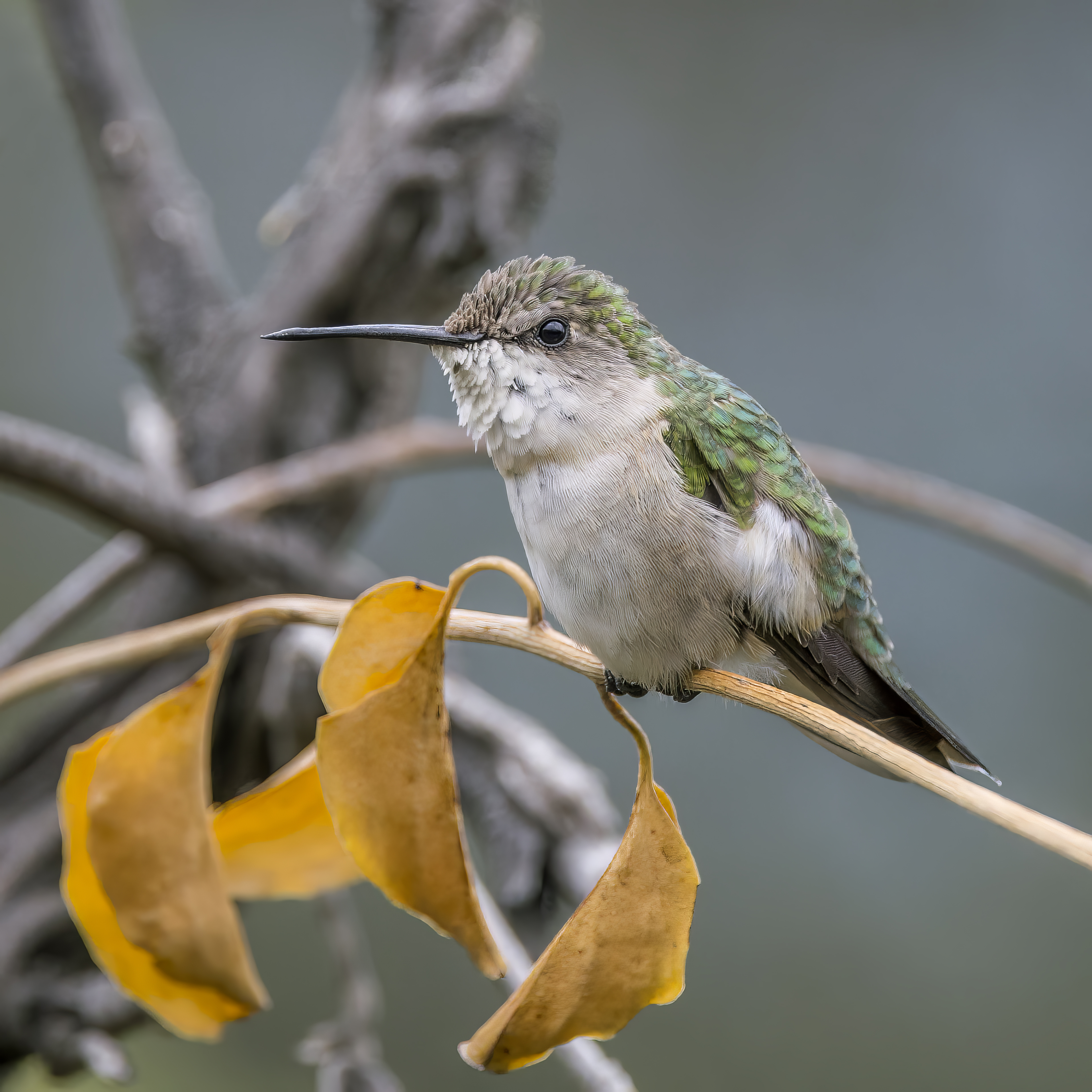
- Female

Conservation status
- Least Concern (IUCN 3.1)
- CITES Appendix II

Scientific classification
- Kingdom: Animalia
- Phylum: Chordata
- Class: Aves
- Order: Apodiformes
- Family: Trochilidae
- Genus: Archilochus
- Species: A. colubris

Binomial name
- Archilochus colubris (Linnaeus, 1758)
- Approximate distribution map Breeding Migration Non-breeding

Synonyms
- Trochilus colubris Linnaeus, 1758

= Ruby-throated hummingbird =

Species of bird

The ruby-throated hummingbird (Archilochus colubris) is a species of hummingbird that generally spends the winter in Central America, Mexico, and Florida, and migrates to Canada and other parts of Eastern North America for the summer to breed. It is the most common hummingbird in eastern North America, having population estimates of about 35 million in 2021.

== Taxonomy ==
The ruby-throated hummingbird was formally described by the Swedish naturalist Carl Linnaeus in 1758 in the tenth edition of his Systema Naturae under the binomial name Trochilus colubris. Linnaeus based his description on the earlier account by Mark Catesby in his The Natural History of Carolina, Florida and the Bahama Islands that had been published in 1729 and that by George Edwards in his A Natural History of Uncommon Birds that had been published in 1743. The type locality is South Carolina. The specific epithet colubris is from the Spanish colibrí meaning "hummingbird". The ruby-throated hummingbird is now placed in the genus Archilochus that was introduced in 1854 by the German naturalist Ludwig Reichenbach. The species is monotypic: no subspecies are recognised.

== Description ==
This hummingbird is from 7 to 9 cm (2.8 to 3.5 in) long and has an 8 to 11 cm (3.1 to 4.3 in) wingspan. Weight can range from 2 to 6 g (0.071 to 0.212 oz), with males averaging 3.4 g (0.12 oz) against the slightly larger female which averages 3.8 g (0.13 oz). Adults are metallic green above and grayish white below, with near-black wings. Their bill, at up to 2 cm (0.79 in), is long, straight, and slender.

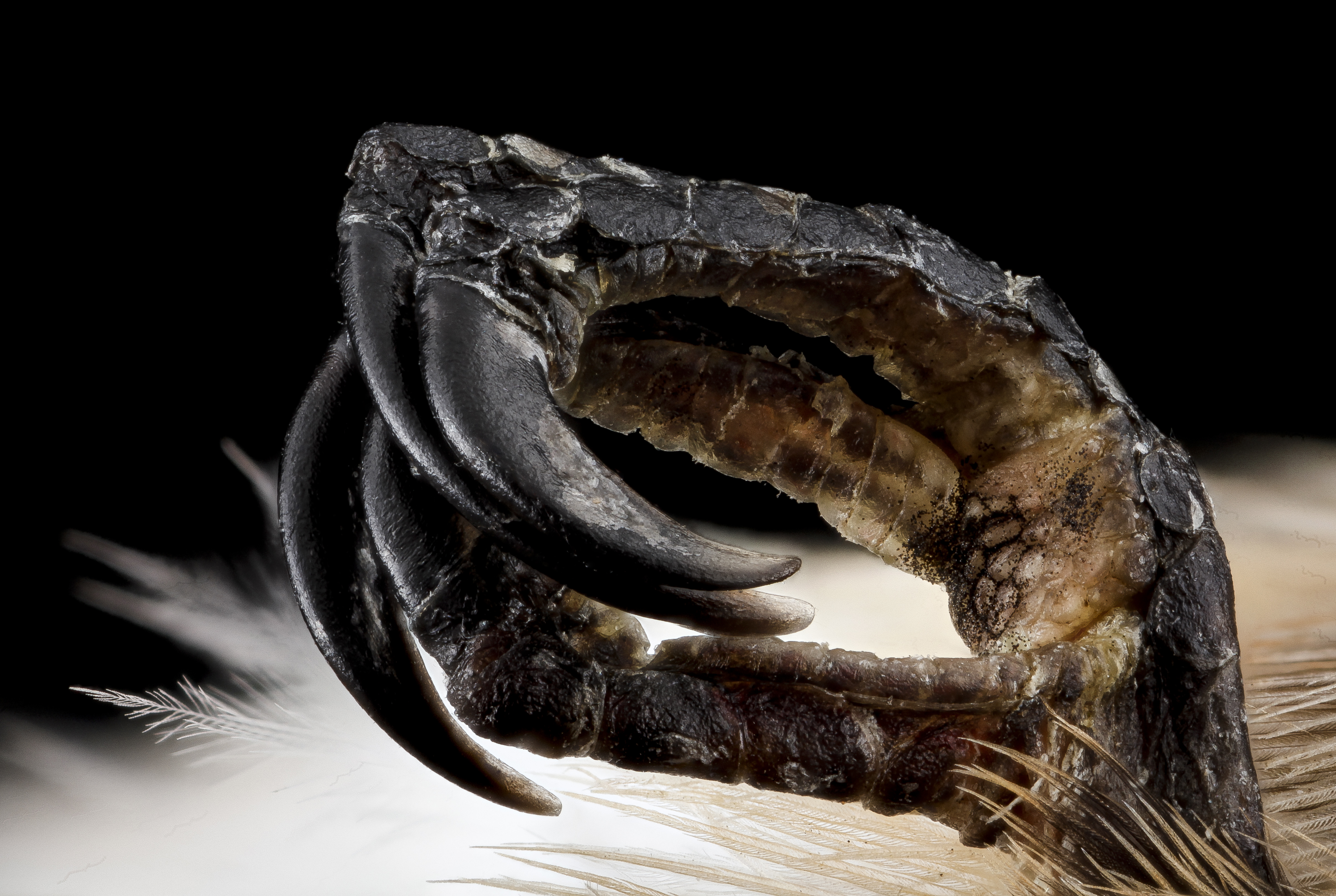
Close-up of toe arrangement in a ruby-throated hummingbird foot, showing three claw-like toes forward and one backward.

Hummingbird legs are short and have feet with three toes pointing forward and one backward – the hallux. The toes are formed as claws (image) with ridged inner surfaces to aid gripping onto flower stems or petals. The middle toe is around 0.6 cm (0.24 in). The ruby-throated hummingbird can only shuffle to move along a branch, although it can scratch-preen with its feet.

The species is sexually dimorphic. The adult male has a gorget (throat patch) of iridescent ruby red bordered narrowly with velvety black on the upper margin and a forked black tail with a faint violet sheen. The red iridescence is highly directional and appears dull black from many angles. The female has a notched tail with outer feathers banded in green, black, and white and a white throat that may be plain or lightly marked with dusky streaks or stipples. Males are smaller than females and have slightly shorter bills. Juvenile males resemble adult females, though usually with heavier throat markings. The plumage is molted once a year on the wintering grounds, beginning in early fall and ending by late winter.

=== Population and status ===
As of 2021, there were 34–36 million ruby-throated hummingbirds over their eastern North American breeding range, making this species the most populous of North American hummingbirds. Despite substantial population growth from 1970 through the early 21st century, numbers of ruby-throated birds declined by 17% over the census reported in 2021. According to the International Union for Conservation of Nature Red List of Threatened Species in 2023, ruby-throated hummingbirds are listed as least-concern for risk of extinction, while numerous other common North American hummingbirds are in significant decline.

=== Vocalization ===
Archilochus colubris call
Chirping of a ruby-throated hummingbird (Archilochus colubris)

The vocalizations of ruby-throated hummingbirds are rapid, squeaky chirps, which are used primarily for threats. For example, males may vocalize to warn another male that has entered his territory.

During the courtship displays, the male makes a rapid tik-tik tik-tik tik-tik sound with his wings. The sound is produced both during the shuttle display, at each end of the side-to-side flight. Also, the sound is made during dive displays. A second, rather faint, repeated whining sound is sometimes produced with the outer tail-feathers during the dive, as the male flies over the female, spreading and shutting the tail as he does so.

== Distribution and habitat ==
The breeding habitat is throughout most of the Eastern United States and south-central and southeastern Canada in deciduous and pine forests and forest edges, orchards, and gardens. The female builds a nest in a protected location in a shrub or a tree. Of all hummingbirds in the United States, this species has the largest breeding range.

The ruby-throated hummingbird is migratory, spending most of the winter in Florida, southern Mexico and Central America, as far south as extreme western Panama, and the West Indies. During migration, some birds embark on a nonstop 900-mile journey across the Gulf of Mexico and Caribbean from Panama or Mexico to the eastern United States. The bird breeds throughout the eastern United States, east of the 100th meridian, and in southern Canada, particularly Ontario, in eastern and mixed deciduous and broadleaved forest. In winter, it is seen mostly in Mexico and Florida.

During migration southward in autumn along the northern coast of the Gulf of Mexico, older male and female birds were better prepared for long-distance flight than first-year birds by having higher body weights and larger fuel loads.

== Behavior and ecology ==
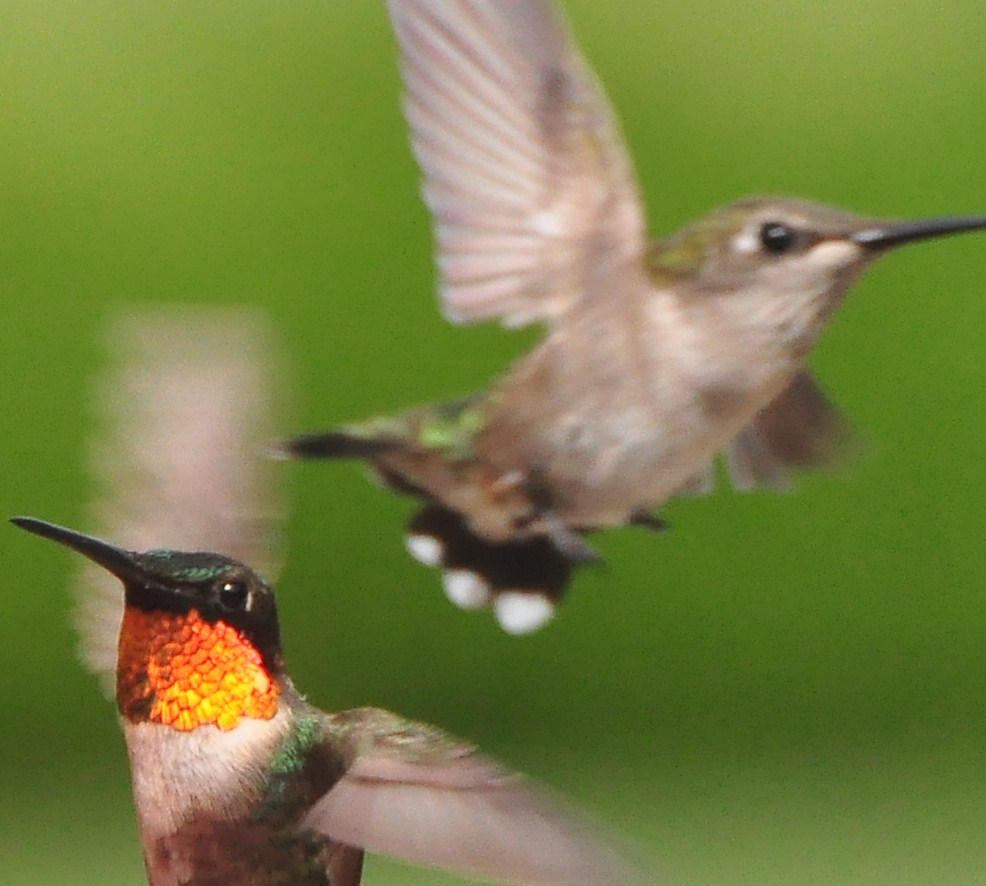
Male (lower left) displaying its prominent gorget and a female ruby-throated hummingbird

Ruby-throated hummingbirds are solitary. Adults of this species are not social, other than during courtship (which lasts a few minutes); the female also cares for her offspring. Both males and females of any age are aggressive toward other hummingbirds. They may defend territories, such as a feeding territory, attacking and chasing other hummingbirds that enter.

As part of their spring migration, portions of the population fly from the Yucatan Peninsula of Mexico across the Gulf of Mexico, arriving first in Florida and Louisiana. This feat is impressive, as an 800 km (500 mi), non-stop flight over water would seemingly require a caloric energy that far exceeds an adult hummingbird's body weight of 3 g (0.11 oz). However, researchers discovered the tiny birds can double their fat mass in preparation for their Gulf crossing, then expend the entire calorie reserve from fat during the 20-hour non-stop crossing when food and water are unavailable.

Hummingbirds have one of the highest metabolic rates of any animal, with heart rates up to 1260 beats per minute, breathing rate of about 250 breaths per minute even at rest, and oxygen consumption of about 4 ml oxygen/g/hour at rest. During flight, hummingbird oxygen consumption per gram of muscle tissue is approximately 10 times higher than that seen for elite human athletes.

They feed frequently while active during the day. When temperatures drop, particularly on cold nights, they may conserve energy by entering hypothermic torpor.

=== Flight ===
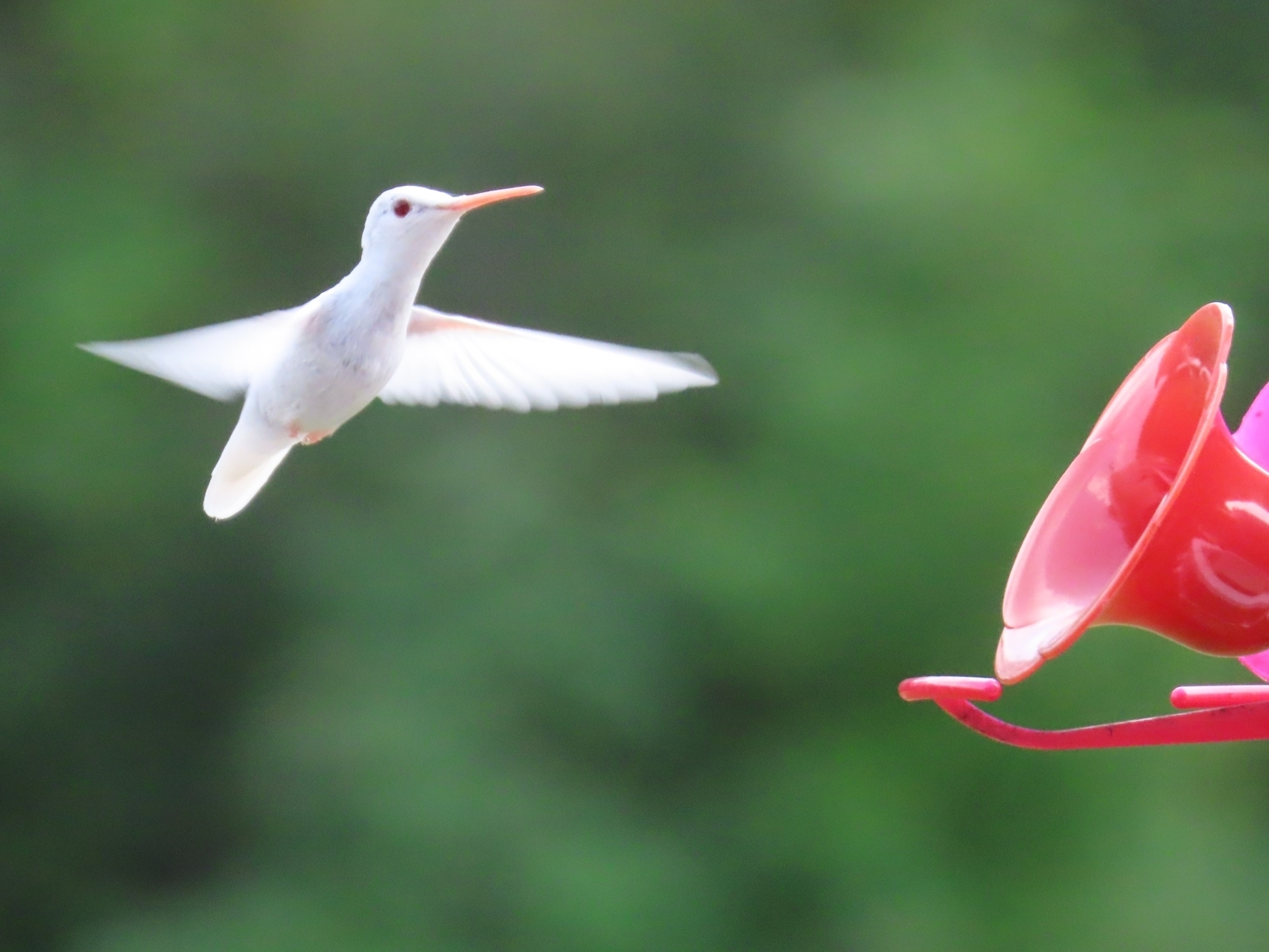
Albino individual at a feeder, in Ontario

Hummingbirds have many skeletal and flight muscle adaptations which allow great agility in flight. Muscles make up 25–30% of their body weight, and they have long, blade-like wings that, unlike the wings of other birds, connect to the body only from the shoulder joint. This adaptation allows the wing to rotate almost 180°, enabling the bird to fly not only forward but backward, and to hover in mid-air, flight capabilities that are similar to insects and unique among birds.

The main wing bone, the humerus, is specifically adapted for hovering flight. Hummingbirds have a relatively short humerus with proportionally massive deltoid-pectoral muscles which permit pronounced wing supination during upstroke when hovering.

A hummingbird's ability to hover is due to its small mass, high wingbeat frequency and relatively large margin of mass-specific power available for flight. Several anatomical features contribute further, including proportionally massive major flight muscles (pectoralis major and supracoracoideus) and wing anatomy that enables the bird to leave its wings extended yet turned over (supine) during the upstroke. This generates lift that supports body weight and maneuvering.

Hummingbirds achieve ability to support their weight and hover from wing beats creating lift on the downstroke of a wing flap and also on the upstroke in a ratio of 75%:25%, respectively, similarly to an insect. Hummingbirds and insects gain lift during hovering partially through inversion of their cambered wings during an upstroke. During hovering, hummingbird wings beat up to 80 times per second.

=== Food and feeding ===
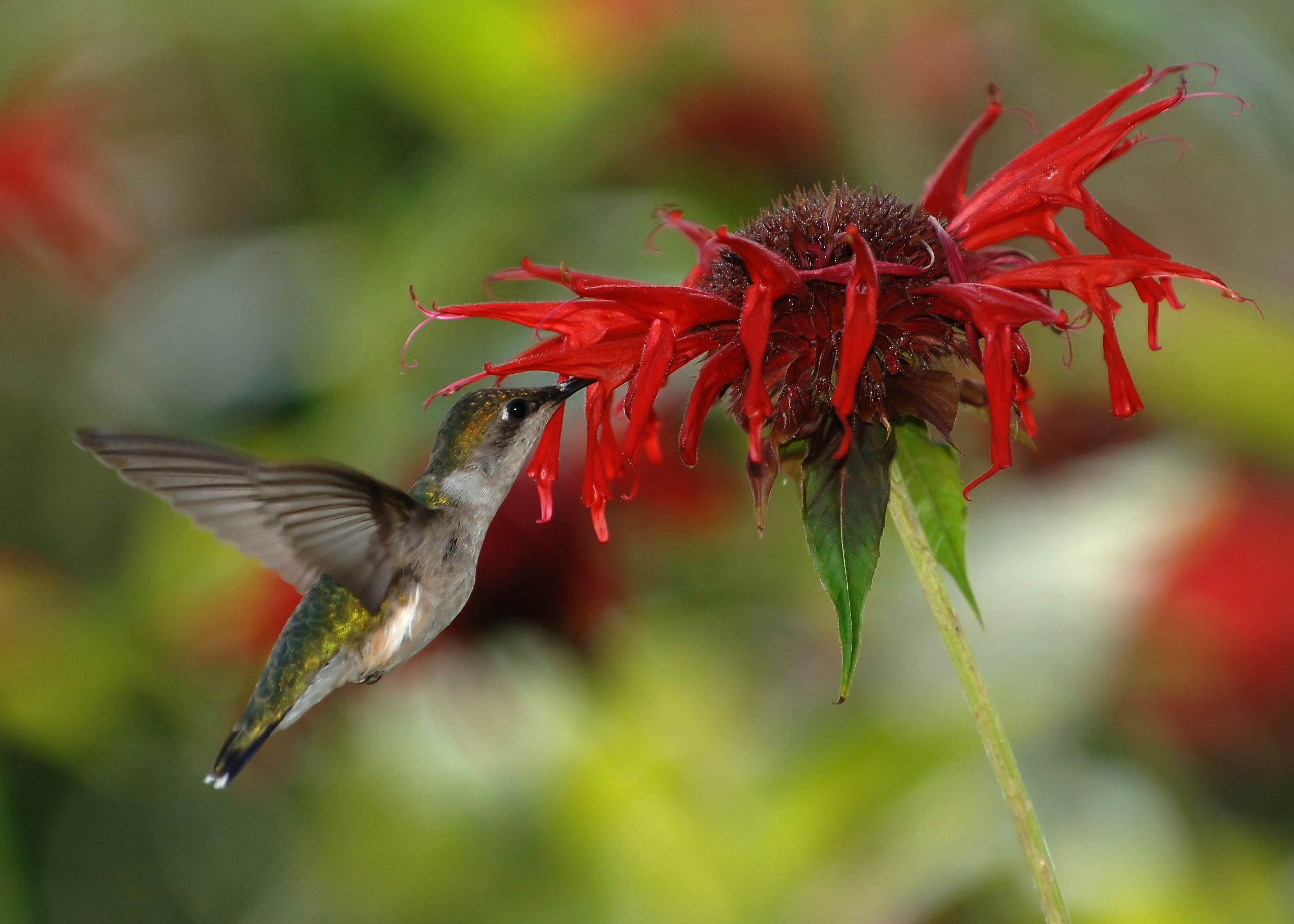
Female feeding on nectar from scarlet beebalm (Monarda didyma)

Nectar from flowers and flowering trees, as well as small insects and spiders, are its main food. Although hummingbirds are well known to feed on nectar, small arthropods are an important source part of protein, minerals, and vitamins in the diet of adult hummingbirds. Hummingbirds show a slight preference for red, orange, and bright pink tubular flowers as nectar sources, though flowers not adapted to hummingbird pollination (e.g., willow catkins) are also visited. Their diet may also occasionally include sugar-rich tree sap taken from sapsucker wells. The birds feed from flowers using a long, extendable tongue and catch insects on the wing or glean them from flowers, leaves, bark, and spiders' webs.

Young birds are fed insects for protein since nectar is an insufficient source of protein for the growing birds.

=== Breeding ===
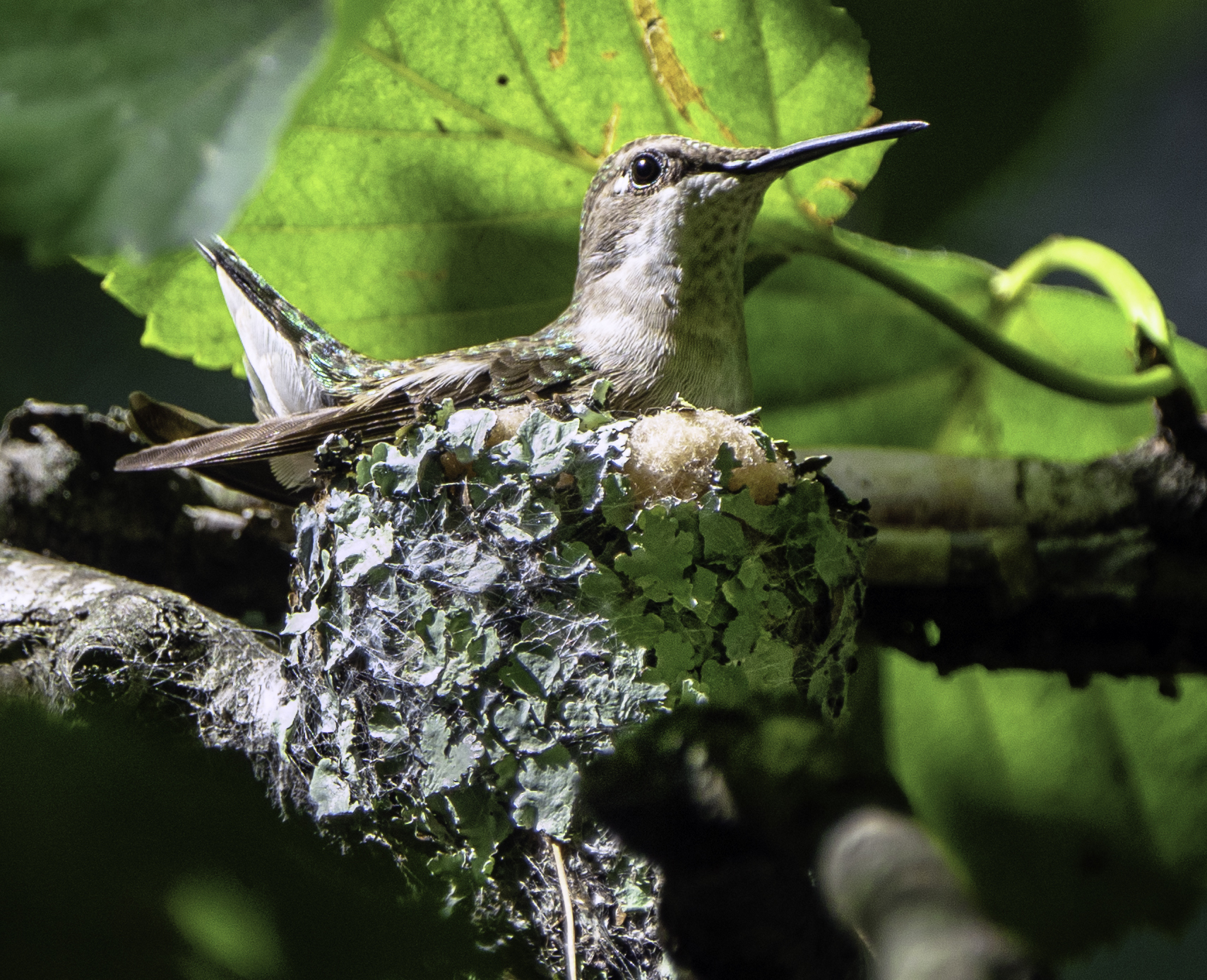
Female ruby-throated hummingbird on nest

As typical for their family, ruby-throated hummingbirds are thought to be polygynous. Polyandry and polygynandry may also occur. They do not form breeding pairs, with males departing immediately after the reproductive act and females providing all parental care.

Males arrive at the breeding area in the spring and establish a territory before the females arrive. When the females return, males court females that enter their territory by performing courtship displays. They perform a "dive display" rising 2.45–3.1 m (8.0–10.2 ft) above and 1.52–1.82 m (5.0–6.0 ft) to each side of the female. If the female perches, the male begins flying in very rapid horizontal arcs less than 0.5 m (1.6 ft) in front of her. If the female is receptive to the male, she may give a call and assume a solicitous posture with her tail feathers cocked and her wings drooped.

The nest is usually constructed on a small, downward-sloping tree limb 3.1 to 12.2 m (10 to 40 ft) feet above the ground. Favored trees are usually deciduous, such as oak, hornbeam, birch, poplar or hackberry, although pines have also been used. Nests have even been found on loops of chain, wire, and extension cords. The nest is composed of bud scales, with lichen on the exterior, bound with spider's silk, and lined with fibers such as plant down (often dandelion or thistle down) and animal hair. Most nests are well camouflaged. Old nests may be occupied for several seasons, but are repaired annually. As in all known hummingbird species, the female alone constructs the nest and cares for the eggs and young.

Females lay two (with a range of 1 to 3) white eggs about 12.9 mm × 8.5 mm (0.51 in × 0.33 in) in size and produce one to two broods each summer. They brood the chicks over a period of 12 to 14 days, by which point they are feathered and homeothermic. The female feeds the chicks from 1 to 3 times every hour by regurgitation, usually while the female continues hovering. When they are 18 to 22 days old, the young leave the nest and make their first flight.

== Longevity and mortality ==
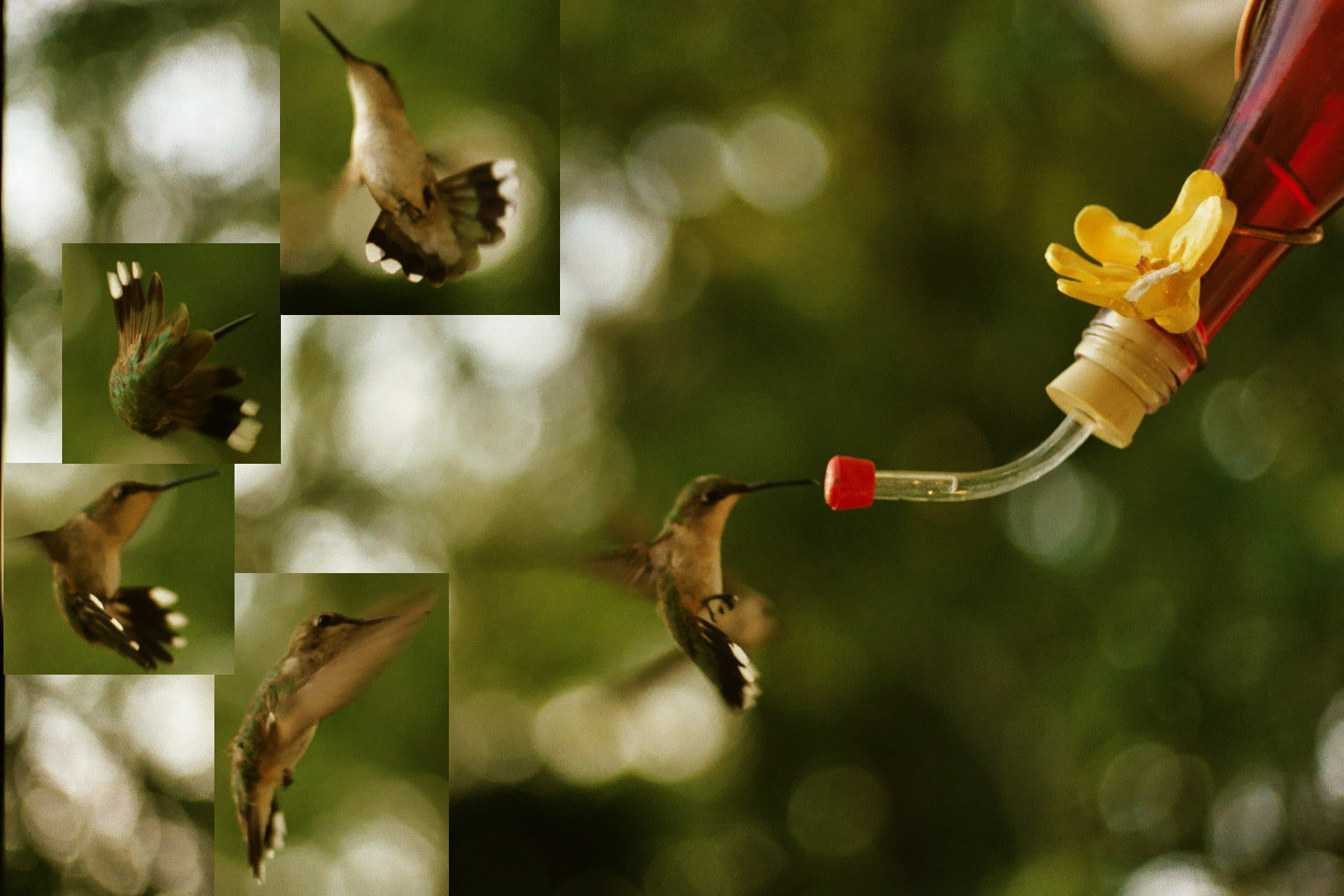
Female ruby-throated hummingbird taking various defensive and evasive actions around a man-made feeder.

The oldest known ruby-throated hummingbird to be banded was 9 years and 1 month of age. Almost all hummingbirds of 7 years or more in age are females, with males rarely surviving past 5 years of age. Reasons for higher mortality in males may include loss of weight during the breeding season due to the high energetic demands of defending a territory followed by energetically costly migration.

A variety of animals prey on hummingbirds given the opportunity. Due to their small size, hummingbirds are vulnerable even to passerine birds and other animals which generally feed on insects. On the other hand, only very swift predators can capture them and a free-flying adult hummingbird is too nimble for most predators. Chief among their predators are the smaller, swifter raptors like sharp-shinned hawks, merlins, American kestrels and Mississippi kites as well as domestic cats, loggerhead shrikes and even greater roadrunners, all of which are likely to ambush the hummingbird while it sits or sleeps on a perch or are distracted by breeding or foraging activities. Predatory lizards and black ratsnakes may also prey on the species, especially on its tropical wintering grounds. Even large, predatory invertebrates have preyed on ruby-throated hummingbirds, including praying mantises (which have been seen to ambush adult hummingbirds at hummingbird feeders on more than one occasion), orb-weaver spiders, and green darners. Blue jays are common predators of nests, as are several other corvids in addition to some icterids, bats, squirrels and chipmunks.

== Gallery ==
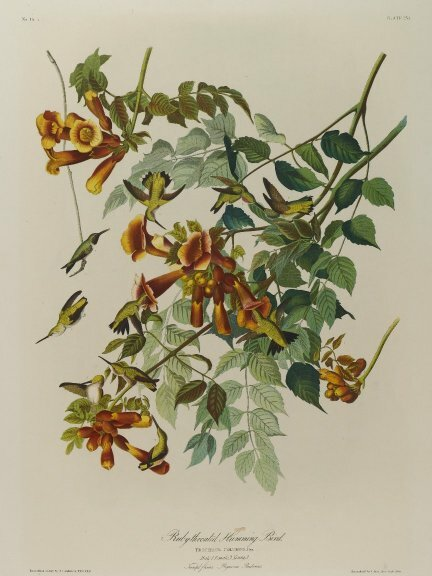
Brooklyn Museum - Ruby-throated hummingbird and trumpet creeper (Campsis radicans) - John J. Audubon

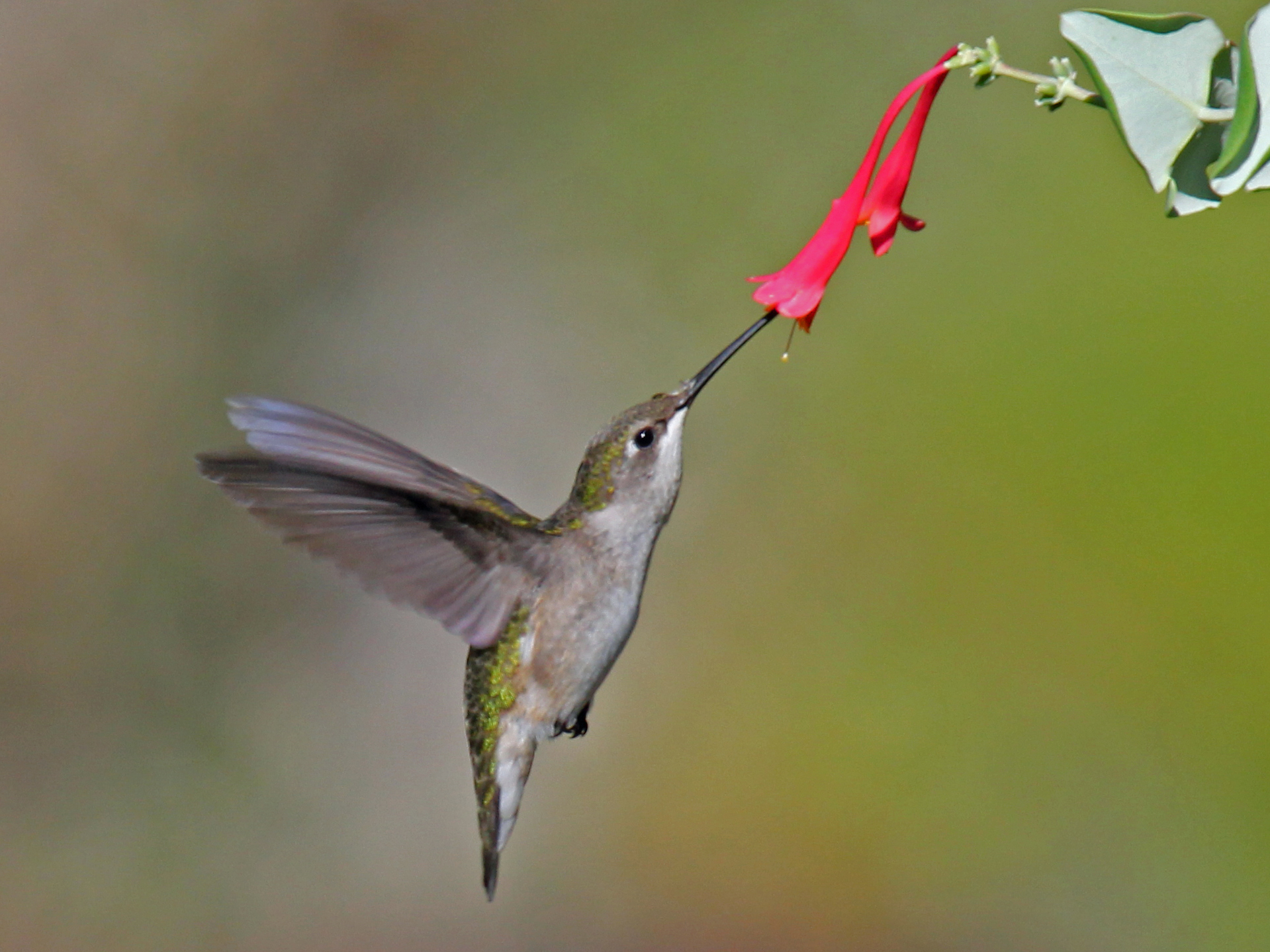
Female ruby-throated hummingbird nectaring on coral honeysuckle (Lonicera sempervirens), North Carolina

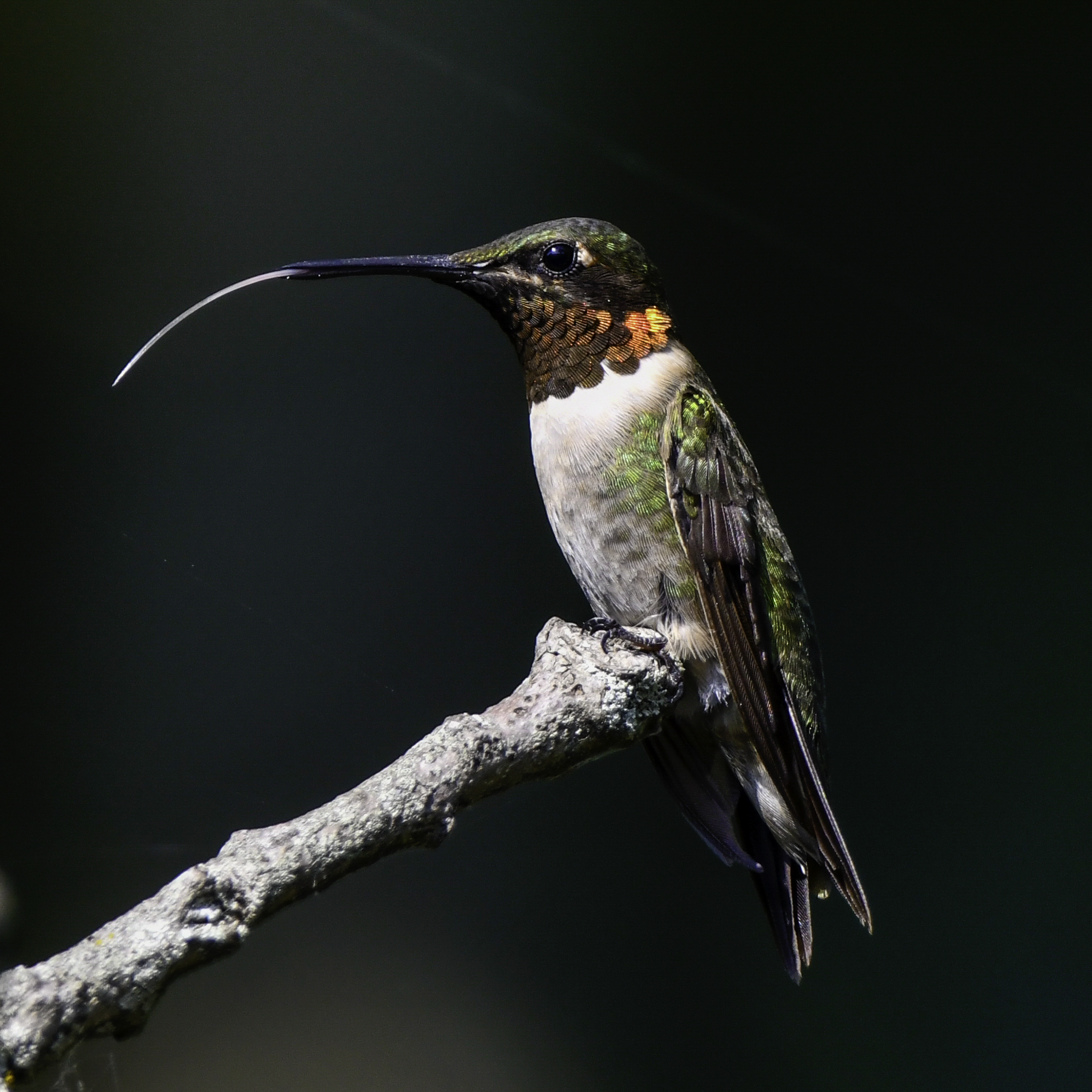
Male ruby-throated hummingbird perched on a branch, displaying its tongue, East Texas

Nest building
