= Diseius =

Scientific classification
- Kingdom: Animalia
- Phylum: Arthropoda
- Subphylum: Chelicerata
- Class: Arachnida
- Order: Mesostigmata
- Family: Ascidae
- Genus: Diseius; Lindquist & Evans, 1965

Genus of mites

Diseius is a genus of mites in the family Ascidae.

== Species ==
- Diseius ulmi (Hirschmann, 1962)

== Distribution ==
Diseius are found generally living in colonies on tree bark.

== Description ==
It has a completely divided dorsal shield without transverse lines extending across the surface. There is a podonotal shield with thirteen pairs of setae, an opisthonotal shield with twelve pairs of setae, a small anal shield with only circumanal setae, and a paranal setae inserted closer to the posterior margin of the anus than to the anterior margin.
