= Zerconopsis =

Scientific classification
- Kingdom: Animalia
- Phylum: Arthropoda
- Subphylum: Chelicerata
- Class: Arachnida
- Order: Mesostigmata
- Family: Ascidae
- Genus: Zerconopsis; Hull, 1918

Genus of mites

Zerconopsis is a genus of mites in the family Ascidae, characterised by the presence of paddle-shaped setae on the back.

== Species ==
- Zerconopsis heilongjiangensis Ma & Yin, 1998
- Zerconopsis muestairi (Schweizer, 1949)
- Zerconopsis pristis Halliday, Walter & Lindquist, 1998
- Zerconopsis remiger (Kramer, 1876)
- Zerconopsis slovacus Masan, 1998
- Zerconopsis yichunensis Ma & Yin, 1998
