= Plesiosejus =

Scientific classification
- Kingdom: Animalia
- Phylum: Arthropoda
- Subphylum: Chelicerata
- Class: Arachnida
- Order: Mesostigmata
- Family: Ascidae
- Genus: Plesiosejus; Evans, 1960

Genus of mites

Plesiosejus is a genus of mites in the family Ascidae.

== Species ==
- Plesiosejus italicus (Berlese, 1905)
