= Anystipalpus percicola =

Scientific classification
- Domain: Eukaryota
- Kingdom: Animalia
- Phylum: Arthropoda
- Subphylum: Chelicerata
- Class: Arachnida
- Order: Mesostigmata
- Family: Laelapidae
- Genus: Anystipalpus
- Species: A. percicola

Binomial name
- Anystipalpus percicola Berlese, 1911

Species of mite

Anystipalpus percicola is a species of mite in the family Laelapidae.
