= Leioseius =

Scientific classification
- Kingdom: Animalia
- Phylum: Arthropoda
- Subphylum: Chelicerata
- Class: Arachnida
- Order: Mesostigmata
- Family: Ascidae
- Genus: Leioseius; Berlese, 1916

Genus of mites

Leioseius is a genus of mites in the family Ascidae.

== Species ==
- Leioseius australis Luxton, 1984
- Leioseius basis Karg, 1994
- Leioseius bicolor (Berlese, 1918)
- Leioseius changbaiensis Yin & Bei, 1991
- Leioseius crassipes (Berlese, 1910)
- Leioseius dolichotrichus Ma-Li-ming, 2002
- Leioseius elongatus Evans, 1958
- Leioseius favosus (Berlese, 1910)
- Leioseius minusculus Berlese, 1905
- Leioseius mirabilis Nikolsky, 1981
- Leioseius naglitschi Karg, 1965
- Leioseius setosulus Berlese, 1916
- Leioseius vallaensis Luxton, 1989
