= Iphidozercon =

Scientific classification
- Kingdom: Animalia
- Phylum: Arthropoda
- Subphylum: Chelicerata
- Class: Arachnida
- Order: Mesostigmata
- Family: Ascidae
- Genus: Iphidozercon; Berlese, 1903

Genus of mites

Iphidozercon is a genus of mites in the family Ascidae.

== Species ==
- Iphidozercon gibbus (Berlese, 1903)
- Iphidozercon poststigmatus Gwiazdowicz, 2003
- Iphidozercon validus Karg, 1996
