= Aceoseius =

Scientific classification
- Kingdom: Animalia
- Phylum: Arthropoda
- Subphylum: Chelicerata
- Class: Arachnida
- Order: Mesostigmata
- Family: Ascidae
- Genus: Aceoseius; Sellnick, 1941

Genus of mites

Aceoseius is a genus of mites in the family Ascidae.

== Species ==
- Aceoseius muricatus (C.L. Koch, 1839)
