= Melichares =

Scientific classification
- Kingdom: Animalia
- Phylum: Arthropoda
- Subphylum: Chelicerata
- Class: Arachnida
- Order: Mesostigmata
- Family: Ascidae
- Genus: Melichares; Hering, 1838

Genus of mites

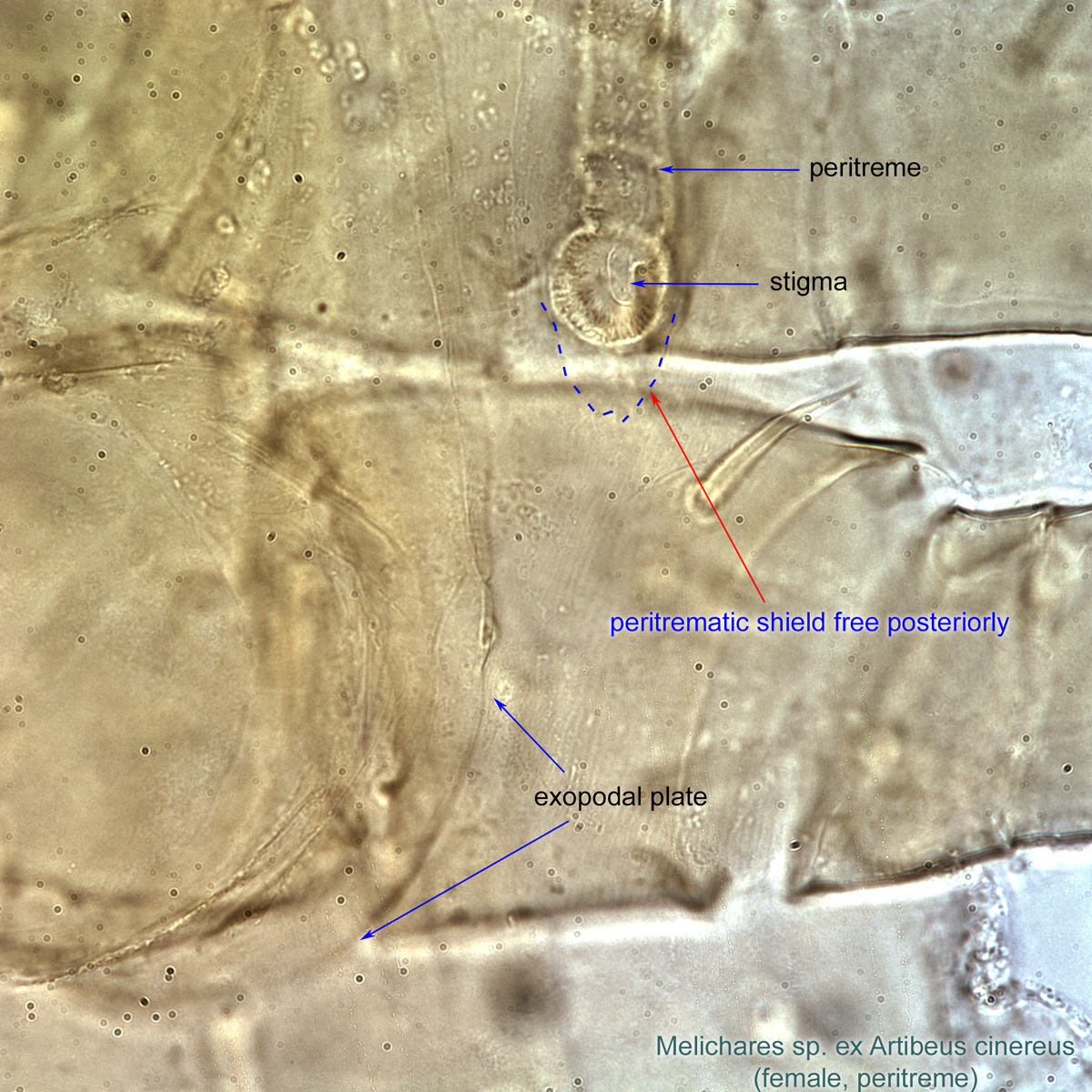

Melichares is a genus of mites in the family Ascidae.

== Species ==
- Melichares aciculatus (Ishikawa, 1968)
- Melichares agilis Hering, 1838
- Melichares algonquian (Lindquist & King-Wan-W, 1991)
- Melichares californicus (Lindquist & King-Wan-W, 1991)
- Melichares crassispinus Ma, Zhang & Li, 2003
- Melichares disparisetus (Lindquist & King-Wan-W, 1991)
- Melichares mexicanus (Lindquist & King-Wan-W, 1991)
- Melichares monochami (Lindquist, 1962)
- Melichares nipponensis (Lindquist & King-Wan-W, 1991)
- Melichares sibiriensis Davydova, 1988
- Melichares squamosus (Lindquist & King-Wan-W, 1991)
