= Mycolaelaps =

Scientific classification
- Kingdom: Animalia
- Phylum: Arthropoda
- Subphylum: Chelicerata
- Class: Arachnida
- Order: Mesostigmata
- Family: Ascidae
- Genus: Mycolaelaps; Lindquist, 1995

Genus of mites

Mycolaelaps is a genus of mites in the family Ascidae.

== Species ==
- Mycolaelaps maxinae Lindquist, 1995
