= Cheiroseiulus =

Scientific classification
- Kingdom: Animalia
- Phylum: Arthropoda
- Subphylum: Chelicerata
- Class: Arachnida
- Order: Mesostigmata
- Family: Ascidae
- Genus: Cheiroseiulus; G. O. Evans & A. S. Baker, 1991

Genus of mites

Cheiroseiulus is a genus of mites in the family Ascidae.

== Species ==
- Cheiroseiulus crassipes Ahmed-Ramadan, 1998
- Cheiroseiulus longisetosus Ahmed-Ramadan, 1998
- Cheiroseiulus punctum Ahmed-Ramadan, 1998
- Cheiroseiulus reniformis G. O. Evans & A. S. Baker, 1991
- Cheiroseiulus spinosus Ahmed-Ramadan, 1998
