= Adhaerenseius =

Scientific classification
- Kingdom: Animalia
- Phylum: Arthropoda
- Subphylum: Chelicerata
- Class: Arachnida
- Order: Mesostigmata
- Family: Ascidae
- Genus: Adhaerenseius; G. C. Loots & P. D. Theron, 1992

Genus of mites

Adhaerenseius is a genus of mites in the family Ascidae.

== Species ==
- Adhaerenseius floralis G. C. Loots & P. D. Theron, 1992
