= Orolaelaps =

Scientific classification
- Kingdom: Animalia
- Phylum: Arthropoda
- Subphylum: Chelicerata
- Class: Arachnida
- Order: Mesostigmata
- Family: Ascidae
- Genus: Orolaelaps de Leon, 1963

Genus of mites

Orolaelaps is a genus of mites in the family Ascidae.

== Species ==
- Orolaelaps quisqualis de Leon, 1963
