= Hoploseius =

Scientific classification
- Kingdom: Animalia
- Phylum: Arthropoda
- Subphylum: Chelicerata
- Class: Arachnida
- Order: Mesostigmata
- Family: Ascidae
- Genus: Hoploseius; Berlese, 1914

Genus of mites

Hoploseius is a genus of mites in the family Ascidae.

== Species ==
- Hoploseius andamanensis Bhattacharyya, 2002
- Hoploseius australianus Walter, 1998
- Hoploseius cometa (Berlese, 1910)
- Hoploseius mariae Gwiazdowicz, 2002
- Hoploseius sitalaensis Bhattacharyya, 1977
