= Anystipalpus =

Scientific classification
- Kingdom: Animalia
- Phylum: Arthropoda
- Subphylum: Chelicerata
- Class: Arachnida
- Order: Mesostigmata
- Family: Laelapidae
- Genus: Anystipalpus; Berlese, 1911

Genus of mites

Anystipalpus is a genus of mites in the family Ascidae.

== Species ==
- Anystipalpus percicola Berlese, 1911
