= Zercoseius =

Scientific classification
- Kingdom: Animalia
- Phylum: Arthropoda
- Subphylum: Chelicerata
- Class: Arachnida
- Order: Mesostigmata
- Family: Ascidae
- Genus: Zercoseius; Berlese, 1916

Genus of mites

Zercoseius is a genus of mites in the family Ascidae.

== Species ==
- Zercoseius paliger (Berlese, 1916)
- Zercoseius spathuliger (Leonardi, 1899)
