= Proctogastrolaelaps =

Scientific classification
- Kingdom: Animalia
- Phylum: Arthropoda
- Subphylum: Chelicerata
- Class: Arachnida
- Order: Mesostigmata
- Family: Ascidae
- Genus: Proctogastrolaelaps; McGraw & Farrier, 1969

Genus of mites

Proctogastrolaelaps is a genus of mites in the family Ascidae.

== Species ==
- Proctogastrolaelaps libris McGraw & Farrier, 1969
