= Xanthippe (mite) =

Scientific classification
- Kingdom: Animalia
- Phylum: Arthropoda
- Subphylum: Chelicerata
- Class: Arachnida
- Order: Mesostigmata
- Family: Ascidae
- Genus: Xanthippe; Naskrecki & Colwell, 1995

Genus of mites

Xanthippe is a genus of mites in the family Ascidae.

== Species ==
- Xanthippe clavisetosa Naskrecki & Colwell, 1995
- Xanthippe hendersoni Naskrecki & Colwell, 1995
