= Cheiroseius =

Scientific classification
- Kingdom: Animalia
- Phylum: Arthropoda
- Subphylum: Chelicerata
- Class: Arachnida
- Order: Mesostigmata
- Family: Ascidae
- Genus: Cheiroseius; Berlese, 1916

Genus of mites

Cheiroseius is a genus of mites in the family Ascidae.

== Species ==
- Cheiroseius aciculatus (Evans & Hyatt, 1960)
- Cheiroseius aequalis (Schweizer, 1961)
- Cheiroseius alpestris Berlese, 1916
- Cheiroseius antennatus Karg, 1979
- Cheiroseius appendicis Karg, 1998
- Cheiroseius areolacus McDaniel & Bolen, 1983
- Cheiroseius basileus (Schweizer, 1961)
- Cheiroseius biarcuatus Karg, 1998
- Cheiroseius borealis (Berlese, 1904)
- Cheiroseius borii (Ishikawa, 1969)
- Cheiroseius brevipes Karg, 1977
- Cheiroseius brevivermis Karg, 1998
- Cheiroseius cascadensis (de Leon, 1964)
- Cheiroseius cassiteridum (Evans & Hyatt, 1960)
- Cheiroseius creber Karg, 1977
- Cheiroseius curtipes (Halbert, 1923)
- Cheiroseius cyclanalis Ma, 2000
- Cheiroseius dentatissimus Karg, 1996
- Cheiroseius eutarsalis Karg, 1998
- Cheiroseius feideri Solomon, 1985
- Cheiroseius ferratus Karg, 1981
- Cheiroseius flagellatus Karg, 1979
- Cheiroseius floridianus (de Leon, 1964)
- Cheiroseius foliatus Karg, 1996
- Cheiroseius frenatus Karg, 1998
- Cheiroseius furcatus Karg, 1973
- Cheiroseius glaber (Berlese, 1886)
- Cheiroseius granulosus Karg, 1998
- Cheiroseius greeneae (de Leon, 1964)
- Cheiroseius guthriei (Ewing, 1913)
- Cheiroseius handschini (Schweizer, 1949)
- Cheiroseius inguinalis Karg, 1977
- Cheiroseius insculptus (Keegan, 1946)
- Cheiroseius kargi Gwiazdowicz, 2002
- Cheiroseius koehleri Karg, 1994
- Cheiroseius laelaptoides (Berlese, 1887)
- Cheiroseius latocorpus Karg, 1998
- Cheiroseius latoventris Karg, 1998
- Cheiroseius levicuspidis Karg, 1998
- Cheiroseius longipes (Willmann, 1951)
- Cheiroseius mackerrasae (Womersley, 1956)
- Cheiroseius mutilus (Berlese, 1916)
- Cheiroseius nasutus Karg, 1981
- Cheiroseius neocorniger (Oudemans, 1903)
- Cheiroseius nepalensis (Evans & Hyatt, 1960)
- Cheiroseius nodosus (Evans & Hyatt, 1960)
- Cheiroseius ocularis Karg, 1998
- Cheiroseius parbatensis (Evans & Hyatt, 1960)
- Cheiroseius phillipi Jordaan, Loots & Theron, 1987
- Cheiroseius plumacuspidis Karg, 1998
- Cheiroseius porulatus Karg, 1996
- Cheiroseius reptantus Karg, 1998
- Cheiroseius salicorniae (Willmann, 1949)
- Cheiroseius saltatorius Karg, 1998
- Cheiroseius sayanicus Bregetova, 1977
- Cheiroseius serratus (Halbert, 1915)
- Cheiroseius severnensis Jordaan, Loots & Theron, 1987
- Cheiroseius signatus (Evans & Hyatt, 1960)
- Cheiroseius sinicus Yin & Bei, 1991
- Cheiroseius siphonophorus Karg, 1998
- Cheiroseius squamofili Karg, 1994
- Cheiroseius squamosus Karg, 1977
- Cheiroseius taoanensis Ma, 1996
- Cheiroseius tennesseensis (de Leon, 1964)
- Cheiroseius tetrados Karg, 1998
- Cheiroseius tosanus (Ishikawa, 1969)
- Cheiroseius trifurcatus Karg, 1998
- Cheiroseius trilobus Karg, 1981
- Cheiroseius trispinosus Karg, 1981
- Cheiroseius trupchumi (Schweizer, 1961)
- Cheiroseius tuberculatus (Evans & Hyatt, 1960)
- Cheiroseius unguiculatus (Berlese, 1887)
- Cheiroseius viduus C.L. Koch, 1839
- Cheiroseius wuwenzheni Ma-Liming, 1996
