= Ascoidea (mite) =

Scientific classification
- Kingdom: Animalia
- Phylum: Arthropoda
- Subphylum: Chelicerata
- Class: Arachnida
- Order: Mesostigmata
- Infraorder: Gamasina
- Superfamily: Ascoidea

Superfamily of mites

Ascoidea is a superfamily of mites. As of March 2022, four families are listed by the Integrated Taxonomic Information System:

- Ameroseiidae
- Antennochelidae
- Ascidae
- Melicharidae
