= Orthadenella =

Scientific classification
- Kingdom: Animalia
- Phylum: Arthropoda
- Subphylum: Chelicerata
- Class: Arachnida
- Order: Mesostigmata
- Family: Ascidae
- Genus: Orthadenella; Athias-Henriot, 1973

Genus of mites

Orthadenella is a genus of mites in the family Ascidae.

== Species ==
- Orthadenella lawrencei (Evans, 1957)
