= Platyseius =

Scientific classification
- Kingdom: Animalia
- Phylum: Arthropoda
- Subphylum: Chelicerata
- Class: Arachnida
- Order: Mesostigmata
- Family: Ascidae
- Genus: Platyseius; Berlese, 1916

Genus of mites

Platyseius is a genus of mites in the family Ascidae.

== Species ==
- Platyseius capillatus Berlese, 1916
- Platyseius cupensis Halliday, Walter & Lindquist, 1998
- Platyseius flagellatus Karg, 1994
- Platyseius horridus (Evans & Hyatt, 1960)
- Platyseius leleupi van-Driel, Loots & Marais, 1977
- Platyseius subglaber (Oudemans, 1903)
