= Arrhenoseius =

Scientific classification
- Kingdom: Animalia
- Phylum: Arthropoda
- Subphylum: Chelicerata
- Class: Arachnida
- Order: Mesostigmata
- Family: Ascidae
- Genus: Arrhenoseius; Walter & Lindquist, 2001

Genus of mites

Arrhenoseius is a genus of mites in the family Ascidae.

== Species ==
- Arrhenoseius gloriosus Walter & Lindquist, 2001
