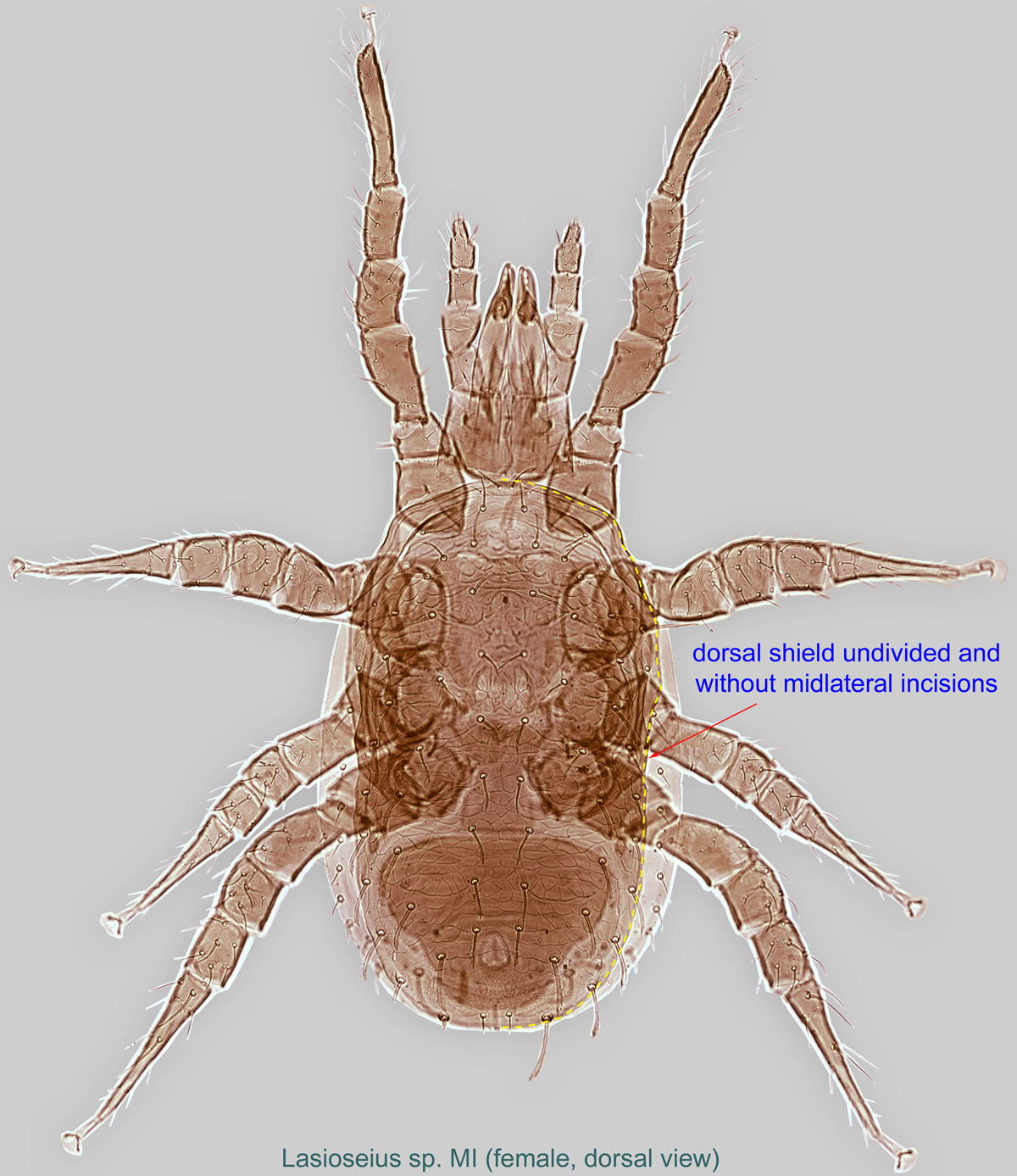
- Female Lasioseius

Scientific classification
- Kingdom: Animalia
- Phylum: Arthropoda
- Subphylum: Chelicerata
- Class: Arachnida
- Order: Mesostigmata
- Family: Ascidae
- Genus: Lasioseius; Berlese, 1916

= Lasioseius =

Genus of mites

Lasioseius is a genus of mites in the family Ascidae.

== Species ==
- Lasioseius albatus (Parvez, Iqbal & Akbar, 2000)
- Lasioseius americanella de Leon, 1964
- Lasioseius analis Evans, 1958
- Lasioseius arboreus Chant, 1963
- Lasioseius athiasae Nawar & Nasr, 1991
- Lasioseius athiashenriotae de Leon, 1963
- Lasioseius berlesei (Oudemans, 1938)
- Lasioseius bilineatus Karg, 1975
- Lasioseius bispinosus Evans, 1958
- Lasioseius boommai Womersley, 1956
- Lasioseius boomsmai Womersley, 1956
- Lasioseius chelaserratus Naeem, Dobkin & OConnor, 1985
- Lasioseius cinnyris Fain & Mariaux, 1991
- Lasioseius confusus Evans, 1958
- Lasioseius corticeus Lindquist, 1971
- Lasioseius cortisimilis Karg, 1994
- Lasioseius cuppa Walter & Lindquist, 1997
- Lasioseius cynari Chant, 1963
- Lasioseius daanensis Ma, 1996
- Lasioseius dentatus (Fox, 1946)
- Lasioseius dentroctoni Chant, 1963
- Lasioseius drosophili Chant, 1963
- Lasioseius dupliramus Karg, 1994
- Lasioseius elegans Fain, Hyland & Aitken, 1977
- Lasioseius epicriodopsis de Leon, 1963
- Lasioseius epicrioides (Krantz, 1962)
- Lasioseius euarmatus Karg, 1994
- Lasioseius eupodis Karg, 1994
- Lasioseius extremus (Daneshvar, 1987)
- Lasioseius faustus (Parvez, Iqbal & Akbar, 2000)
- Lasioseius fenchihuensis Tseng, 1978
- Lasioseius fimetorum Karg, 1971
- Lasioseius fissurae Karg, 1980
- Lasioseius fissuratus Berlese, 1916
- Lasioseius floralis Karg, 1976
- Lasioseius formosus Westerboer, 1963
- Lasioseius furcisetus Athias Henriot, 1959
- Lasioseius garambae Krantz, 1962
- Lasioseius glomerulus Karg, 1979
- Lasioseius grandis Berlese, 1916
- Lasioseius inconspicuus Westerboer, 1962
- Lasioseius indicus Bhattacharyya, Sanyal & Bhattacharya, 2000
- Lasioseius japonicus Ehara, 1965
- Lasioseius jilinensis Ma, 1996
- Lasioseius kargi Kandil, 1980
- Lasioseius kinikinik Walter & Lindquist, 1989
- Lasioseius krantzi Chant, 1963
- Lasioseius kshamae Bhattacharyya, 2003
- Lasioseius lacunosus Westerboer, 1963
- Lasioseius lanciolatus Chant, 1963
- Lasioseius lendis (Parvez, Iqbal & Akbar, 2000)
- Lasioseius leptoscuti Karg, 1994
- Lasioseius liaohaorongae Ma-Liming, 1996
- Lasioseius lindquisti Nasr & Abou-Awad, 1987
- Lasioseius malacca Gupta & Paul, 1992
- Lasioseius manyarae Hurlbutt, 1972
- Lasioseius matthyssei Chant, 1963
- Lasioseius mcgregori Chant, 1963
- Lasioseius medius Gu-Yiming & Guo-Xiangu, 1994
- Lasioseius meridionalis Chant, 1963
- Lasioseius mirabilis Christian & Karg, 1992
- Lasioseius mouchei Loots, 1980
- Lasioseius multidentatus Karg, 1994
- Lasioseius multisetus Chant, 1963
- Lasioseius multispathus Gu & Huang, in Gu, Wang & Huang 1990
- Lasioseius mumai de Leon, 1963
- Lasioseius nambirimae Krantz, 1962
- Lasioseius nomus Athias Henriot, 1959
- Lasioseius oblongus (Ewing, 1909)
- Lasioseius oculus Karg, 1980
- Lasioseius ometes (Oudemans, 1903)
- Lasioseius ometisimilis Westerboer, 1963
- Lasioseius operculi Karg, 1980
- Lasioseius oryzaephilus Koshanova, 1987
- Lasioseius parabispinosus Kandil, 1980
- Lasioseius paraconfusus Li, Yang & Li, 2000
- Lasioseius parberlesei Bhattacharyya, 1968
- Lasioseius paucispathus Gu & Wang, in Gu, Wang & Huang 1990
- Lasioseius pellitus Karg, 1994
- Lasioseius penicilliger Berlese, 1916
- Lasioseius peritremus Nasr & Abou-Awad, 1987
- Lasioseius peterfuldi Ohmer, Fain & Schuchmann, 1991
- Lasioseius phytoseioides Chant, 1963
- Lasioseius plumatus Karg, 1980
- Lasioseius podocinoides Berlese, 1916
- Lasioseius porulosus de Leon, 1963
- Lasioseius praevius Gu-Yiming & Guo-Xiangu, 1994
- Lasioseius punctatus Gu & Huang, in Gu, Wang & Huang 1990
- Lasioseius punjabensis Bhattacharyya & Sanyal, 2002
- Lasioseius pusillus Berlese, 1916
- Lasioseius qiamensis Gu & Huang, in Gu, Wang & Huang 1990
- Lasioseius qinghaiensis Wang & Li, 2001
- Lasioseius quadrisetosus Chant, 1960
- Lasioseius quandong Walter & Lindquist, 1997
- Lasioseius queenslandicus (Womersley, 1956)
- Lasioseius reticulatus Bhattacharyya, 1968
- Lasioseius rostratus Karg, 1996
- Lasioseius rugosa (Halliday, 1995)
- Lasioseius safroi (Ewing, 1920)
- Lasioseius sagittarius Ishikawa, 1975
- Lasioseius sahai Bhattacharyya, Sanyal & Bhattacharya, 2000
- Lasioseius saltatus Karg, 1980
- Lasioseius scapulatus Kennett, 1958
- Lasioseius schizopilus Gu & Huang, in Gu, Wang & Huang 1990
- Lasioseius scilliticus Tseng, 1978
- Lasioseius sewai Nasr & Abou-Awad, 1987
- Lasioseius similis Berlese, 1916
- Lasioseius sinensis Bei & Yin, 1995
- Lasioseius sisiri Bhattacharyya, Sanyal & Bhattacharya, 1998
- Lasioseius spatulus Gu & Wang, in Gu, Wang & Huang 1990
- Lasioseius spectabilis de Leon, 1973
- Lasioseius subterraneus Chant, 1963
- Lasioseius sugawarai Ehara, 1964
- Lasioseius taiwanicus Tseng, 1978
- Lasioseius tetraspinosus Karg, 1980
- Lasioseius thermophilus Willmann, 1942
- Lasioseius traveni Walter & Lindquist, 1997
- Lasioseius triangularis Bhattacharyya & Sanyal, 2002
- Lasioseius tridentis Karg, 1979
- Lasioseius trifurcipilus Gu & Guo, 1996
- Lasioseius trigonus Karg, 1994
- Lasioseius tuberculatus Karg, 1980
- Lasioseius wangi Ma, 1988
- Lasioseius wondjina Walter & Lindquist, 1997
- Lasioseius yini Bai, Fang & Chen, 1995
- Lasioseius youcefi Athias Henriot, 1959
- Lasioseius zaluckii Walter & Lindquist, 1997
- Lasioseius zerconoides Willmann, 1954
- Lasioseius zicsii Kandil, 1980
