= Tropicoseius =

Scientific classification
- Kingdom: Animalia
- Phylum: Arthropoda
- Subphylum: Chelicerata
- Class: Arachnida
- Order: Mesostigmata
- Family: Ascidae
- Genus: Tropicoseius; Baker & Yunker, 1964

Genus of mites

Tropicoseius is a genus of mites in the family Ascidae.

== Species ==
- Tropicoseius adsimilis (Fain & Hyland, 1980)
- Tropicoseius analis (Fain & Hyland, 1980)
- Tropicoseius bellavistensis (Wiese & Fain, 1993)
- Tropicoseius berryi Naskrecki & Colwell, 1998
- Tropicoseius bisacculatus (Fain, Hyland & Aitken, 1977)
- Tropicoseius carlosalberti (Wiese & Fain, 1993)
- Tropicoseius cervus Naskrecki & Colwell, 1998
- Tropicoseius chazdonae Naskrecki & Colwell, 1998
- Tropicoseius chlorestes (Fain, Hyland & Aitken, 1977)
- Tropicoseius columbiensis (Fain & Hyland, 1980)
- Tropicoseius colwelli (Hunter, 1972)
- Tropicoseius erioxynon Naskrecki & Colwell, 1998
- Tropicoseius fidelis (OConnor, Colwell & Naeem, 1997)
- Tropicoseius fuentesi Naskrecki & Colwell, 1998
- Tropicoseius kaliszewskii Naskrecki & Colwell, 1998
- Tropicoseius klepticos (OConnor, Colwell & Naeem, 1997)
- Tropicoseius kressi Naskrecki & Colwell, 1998
- Tropicoseius naeemi Naskrecki & Colwell, 1998
- Tropicoseius ochoai Naskrecki & Colwell, 1998
- Tropicoseius ornatus (Fain & Hyland, 1980)
- Tropicoseius perezgloriae (Wiese & Fain, 1993)
- Tropicoseius phoreticus (Fain, Hyland & Aitken, 1977)
- Tropicoseius rowelli Naskrecki & Colwell, 1998
- Tropicoseius steini Naskrecki & Colwell, 1998
- Tropicoseius trinitatis (Fain, Hyland & Aitken, 1977)
- Tropicoseius uniformis (Fain, Hyland & Aitken, 1977)
