= Rhinoseius =

Scientific classification
- Kingdom: Animalia
- Phylum: Arthropoda
- Subphylum: Chelicerata
- Class: Arachnida
- Order: Mesostigmata
- Family: Ascidae
- Genus: Rhinoseius; Baker & Yunker, 1964

Genus of mites

Rhinoseius is a genus of mites in the family Ascidae.

== Species ==
- Rhinoseius androdon Fain & Hyland, 1980
- Rhinoseius antioquiensis Fain & Hyland, 1980
- Rhinoseius bakeri (Dusbabek & Cerny, 1970)
- Rhinoseius bisacculatus Fain, Hyland & Aitken, 1977
- Rhinoseius braziliensis Baker & Yunker, 1964
- Rhinoseius caucaensis Ohmer, Fain & Schuchmann, 1991
- Rhinoseius changensis (Baker & Yunker, 1964)
- Rhinoseius chiriquensis (Baker & Yunker, 1964)
- Rhinoseius chocoensis Wiese & Fain, 1996
- Rhinoseius eisenmanni (Baker & Yunker, 1964)
- Rhinoseius epoecus Colwell & Naeem, 1979
- Rhinoseius erro (Baker & Yunker, 1964)
- Rhinoseius eutoxeres Fain & Hyland, 1980
- Rhinoseius fairchildi (Baker & Yunker, 1964)
- Rhinoseius haplophaedia Ohmer, Fain & Schuchmann, 1991
- Rhinoseius heliconiae (Baker & Yunker, 1964)
- Rhinoseius luteyni Naskrecki & Colwell, 1998
- Rhinoseius mathewsoni Hyland, Fain & Moorhouse, 1978
- Rhinoseius nadachowskyi Wiese & Fain, 1993
- Rhinoseius pastorae Wiese & Fain, 1993
- Rhinoseius peregrinator (Baker & Yunker, 1964)
- Rhinoseius phaethornis Fain, Hyland & Aitken, 1977
- Rhinoseius phoreticus Fain, Hyland & Aitken, 1977
- Rhinoseius rafinskii Micherdzinski & Lukoschus, 1980
- Rhinoseius richardsoni Hunter, 1972
- Rhinoseius tiponi Baker & Yunker, 1964
- Rhinoseius trinitatis Fain, Hyland & Aitken, 1977
- Rhinoseius ucumariensis Wiese & Fain, 1993
- Rhinoseius uniformis Fain, Hyland & Aitken, 1977
- Rhinoseius venezuelensis (Baker & Yunker, 1964)
- Rhinoseius waidei Fain & Hyland, 1980
- Rhinoseius wetmorei (Baker & Yunker, 1964)
