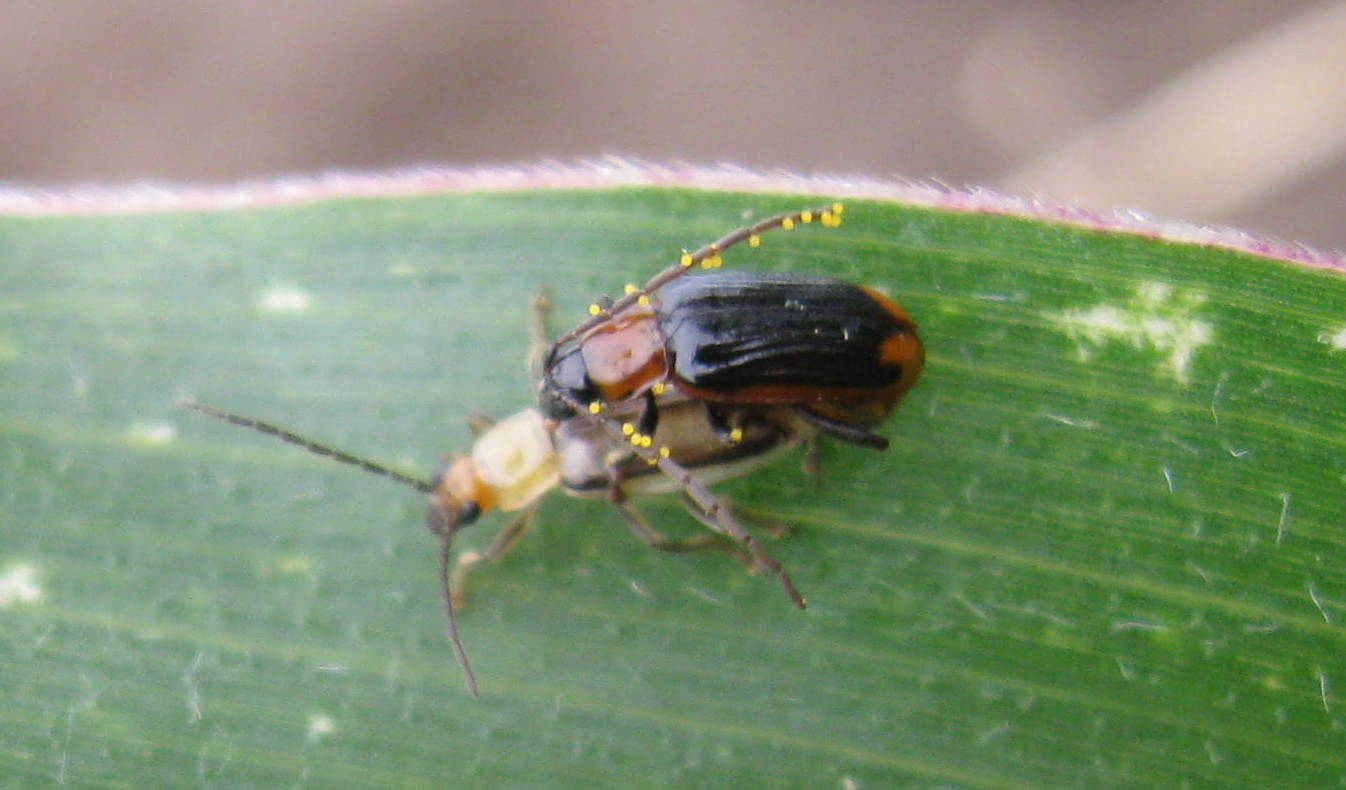

Scientific classification
- Kingdom: Animalia
- Phylum: Arthropoda
- Subphylum: Chelicerata
- Class: Arachnida
- Order: Mesostigmata
- Family: Ascidae
- Genus: Proctolaelaps; Berlese, 1923

= Proctolaelaps =

Genus of mites

Proctolaelaps is a genus of mites in the family Ascidae.

== Species ==
- Proctolaelaps antennatus Karg, 1985
- Proctolaelaps arctorotundus Nikolsky, 1984
- Proctolaelaps aurora (Vitzthum, 1925)
- Proctolaelaps australis C.Stone, 1988
- Proctolaelaps basis Karg, 1979
- Proctolaelaps belemensis Fain, Hyland & Aitken, 1977
- Proctolaelaps bicaudatus Karg, 1994
- Proctolaelaps bickleyi (Bram, 1956)
- Proctolaelaps bloemfonteinensis Hanekom, Loots & Theron, 1988
- Proctolaelaps certator OConnor, Colwell & Naeem, 1991
- Proctolaelaps chalybura Dusbabek & Capek, 2007
- Proctolaelaps coffeae Karg, in Karg & Rodriguez 1985
- Proctolaelaps contactus Karg, 1985
- Proctolaelaps contentiosus OConnor, Colwell & Naeem, 1991
- Proctolaelaps cotumex OConnor, Colwell & Naeem, 1991
- Proctolaelaps cubanus Karg, in Karg & Rodriguez 1985
- Proctolaelaps de Leoni Mawar, Childers & Abou-Setta, 1991
- Proctolaelaps debensis Jordaan & Loots, 1987
- Proctolaelaps diffissus Karg, 1976
- Proctolaelaps drosophilae Karg, Baker & Jenkinson, 1995
- Proctolaelaps eccoptogasteris Vitzthum, 1923
- Proctolaelaps euserratus Karg, 1994
- Proctolaelaps glaucis Fain, Hyland & Aitken, 1977
- Proctolaelaps holmi Halliday, 2001
- Proctolaelaps hystrix (Vitzthum, 1923)
- Proctolaelaps jurgatus OConnor, Colwell & Naeem, 1991
- Proctolaelaps kielczewskii Wisniewski, 1980
- Proctolaelaps lobatus De Leon, 1963
- Proctolaelaps longichelicerae Ma-Liming, 1996
- Proctolaelaps longisetosa (Postner, 1951)
- Proctolaelaps mermillion OConnor, Colwell & Naeem, 1991
- Proctolaelaps mexicanus Hyland, Fain & Moorhouse, 1978
- Proctolaelaps micropiloides Karg, 1994
- Proctolaelaps moseri Wisniewski, 1980
- Proctolaelaps naskreckii Dusbabek & Halicaek, 2007
- Proctolaelaps nauphoetae (Womersley, 1956)
- Proctolaelaps nesbitti (Womersley, 1956)
- Proctolaelaps novineus El-Banhawy & Nasr, 1986
- Proctolaelaps opilionis Karg, 1994
- Proctolaelaps orbicularis Karg, 1985
- Proctolaelaps oribatoides Karg, 1979
- Proctolaelaps productus Berlese, 1923
- Proctolaelaps pruni Karg, 1988
- Proctolaelaps pseudofiseri Nikolsky, 1984
- Proctolaelaps pygmaeus (J. Müller, 1859)
- Proctolaelaps rabulatus OConnor, Colwell & Naeem, 1991
- Proctolaelaps rectangularis Karg, 1985
- Proctolaelaps reticulatosimilis Bhattacharyya, Sanyal & Bhattacharya, 1998
- Proctolaelaps roodeplaatensis Hanekom, Loots & Theron, 1988
- Proctolaelaps slovacus Masan, 1998
- Proctolaelaps spencerae Domrow, 1979
- Proctolaelaps spiralis Hyland, Fain & Moorhouse, 1978
- Proctolaelaps striatus Westerboer, 1963
- Proctolaelaps threnetes Dusbabek & Literak, 2007
- Proctolaelaps ventrianalis Karg, 1971
- Proctolaelaps yinchuanensis Bai, Yin & Gu, 1993
