= Ascidae =

Ascidae Temporal range: Palaeogene–present

Scientific classification
- Kingdom: Animalia
- Phylum: Arthropoda
- Subphylum: Chelicerata
- Class: Arachnida
- Order: Mesostigmata
- Superfamily: Ascoidea
- Family: Ascidae; Oudemans, 1905

Family of mites

Ascidae is a family of mites in the order Mesostigmata.

== Description ==
Ascidae are mites characterised by: seta st4 usually on unsclerotised cuticle, peritrematic shield broadly connected to exopodal shield beside coxa IV, fixed cheliceral digit with setiform pilus dentilis and movable cheliceral digit usually with two teeth, sternal shield with three pairs of lyrifissures and the third pair usually on the shield's posterior margin, genital shield truncate to convex posteriorly (tapering in some Antennoseius), with an anal shield bearing only circumanal setae (rare) or a ventrianal shield bearing additionally up to seven pairs of setae, and spermathecal apparatus laelapid-type.

This family is morphologically similar to Blattisociidae and Melicharidae, and these families were formerly included within Ascidae.

== Life cycle ==
The life cycle of Ascidae consists of the stages egg, larva, protonymph, deutonymph and adult. Each stage has a duration measurable in days. The total lifespan is similarly short, being on average 27 days in Arctoseius semiscissus and 19 days in Proctolaelaps deleoni.

== Ecology ==
Ascidae include epedaphic species that hunt on the soil surface in the litter layer. These prey on other small arthropods, particularly springtails (Collembola). Nematophagy (consumption of nematodes) is also prevalent in soil-dwelling Ascidae.

Other habitats from which Ascidae have been collected include under bark of dead trees, on small mammals, and in nests of birds and mammals.

Though mostly terrestrial, some ascids live on wet plants and detritus and on the water surface of marginal freshwater habitats. These walk about on the surface film and feed on the floating egg masses of nematocerous flies such as mosquitoes.

Ascidae can disperse to new environments via phoresis: riding on larger arthropods. Species of Arctoseius are phoretic on adults of mushroom sciarid fly, Lycoriella auripila (whose eggs and larvae they consume), while aquatic ascids are phoretic on adult crane flies.

== Zoogeography ==
Ascidae occur in many countries and regions. The highest numbers of species, endemic species and genera occur in the Palearctic. On the other hand, the most speciose genus, Asca, has the most species in the Neotropical and Oriental regions. Ascidae is believed to have originated from the Palearctic.

== Genera ==
- Aceoseius Sellnick, 1941
- Adhaerenseius G. C. Loots & P. D. Theron, 1992
- Africoseius Krantz, 1962
- Anephiasca Athias-Henriot, 1969
- Antennoseius Berlese, 1916
- Anystipalpus Berlese, 1911
- Arctopsis Athias-Henriot, 1973
- Arctoseius Thor, 1930
- Arrhenoseius Walter & Lindquist, 2001
- Asca von Heyden, 1826
- Blattisocius Keegan, 1944
- Cheiroseiulus G. O. Evans & A. S. Baker, 1991
- Cheiroseius Berlese, 1916
- Diseius Lindquist & Evans, 1965
- Ectoantennoseius Walter, 1998
- Gamasellodes Athias-Henriot, 1961
- Hoploseius Berlese, 1914
- Iphidozercon Berlese, 1903
- Laelaptoseius Womersley, 1960
- Lasioseius Berlese, 1916
- Leioseius Berlese, 1916
- Melichares Hering, 1838
- Mycolaelaps Lindquist, 1995
- Neojordensia Evans, 1957
- Orolaelaps de Leon, 1963
- Orthadenella Athias-Henriot, 1973
- Paraproctolaelaps Bregetova, 1977
- Platyseius Berlese, 1916
- Plesiosejus Evans, 1960
- Proctogastrolaelaps McGraw & Farrier, 1969
- Proctolaelaps Berlese, 1923
- Protogamasellus Karg, 1962
- Rettenmeyerius Elzinga, 1998
- Rhinoseius Baker & Yunker, 1964
- Tropicoseius Baker & Yunker, 1964
- Xanthippe Naskrecki & Colwell, 1995
- Xenoseius Lindquist & Evans, 1965
- Zerconopsis Hull, 1918
- Zercoseius Berlese, 1916
