= ACSA =

Acsa or ACSA may refer to:

== Acronyms ==
- Acquisition and Cross-Servicing Agreement
- Airports Company South Africa, a South African airport operator
- American CueSports Alliance, although their official acronym is simply "ACS"
- American Czech and Slovak Association, facilitating Czech and Slovak relations with the US
- Anglican Church of Southern Africa, the Anglican province covering Southern Africa
- Anvil City Science Academy, a school in Alaska, US
- Apple Certified System Administrator, an Apple Computer certification program
- Army of the Confederate States of America, the "regular army" component of the Confederate States Army
- Association of Cardiothoracic Surgical Assistants, representing surgical assistants in cardiothoracics
- Australian Catholic Students Association
- AIDS council of South Australia, an advisor to the Sex Industry Network

== Places ==
- Acsa, a village in Pest County, Hungary

== See also ==
- ACSA-CAAH, Canadian Association for Adolescent Health
- Asca, a genus of mites
