= Wolters Kluwer =

Netherlands-based global professional services company

Wolters Kluwer N.V.
- Type: Public
- Traded as: Euronext Amsterdam: WKL; AEX component
- ISIN: NL0000395903; NL0006177032; US9778742059
- Industry: Software, information services
- Founded: 1968; 58 years ago
- Headquarters: Alphen aan den Rijn, Netherlands (global)
- Key people: Stacey Caywood (CEO)
- Products: Health, corporate services, finance, tax, accounting, law and regulatory software, services, workflow tools, and publications
- Revenue: €6.1 billion (2025)
- Operating income: 1,735,000,000 euro (2025)
- Net income: 1,225,000,000 euro (2025)
- Number of employees: 21,100 (2026)
- Website: wolterskluwer.com

Wolters Kluwer N.V. is a Dutch multinational company that provides information, software, and services for accountants, doctors, lawyers, and other professionals. The company serves legal, business, tax, accounting, finance, audit, risk, compliance, and healthcare markets.

Wolters Kluwer's product portfolio includes: UpToDate, CCH, Enablon, CT Corporation, Lippincott, CCH Tagetik, Inview, Brightflag, Ovid, and TeamMate.

The company's global headquarters are in Alphen aan den Rijn, Netherlands.

== History ==
=== Early history ===
Jan-Berend Wolters founded the Schoolbook publishing house in Groningen, Netherlands, in 1836. In 1858, the Noordhoff publishing house was founded alongside the Schoolbook publishing house. The two publishing houses merged in 1968. Wolters-Noordhoff merged with Information and Communications Union (ICU) in 1972 and took the name ICU. ICU acquired Croner in 1977, ICU changed its name to Wolters-Samsom in 1983. The company began serving foreign law firms and multinational companies in China in 1985. In 1987, Elsevier, the largest publishing house in the Netherlands, announced its intentions to buy up Kluwer's stock. Kluwer merged with Wolters-Samsom to fend off Elsevier's takeover bid and formed Wolters Kluwer. The merger made Wolters Kluwer the second-largest publishing house in the Netherlands.

After the merger, Wolters Kluwer began expanding internationally with the purchase of IPSOA Editore, Kieser Verlag, Technipublicaciones, and Tele Consulte in 1989. By the end of the year, Wolters Kluwer expanded its presence to Spain, West Germany and France. The company also launched LEX, its legal information system, in Poland. In 1989, 44% of the company's revenue was earned in foreign markets.

=== 1990s ===
The following year, Wolters Kluwer purchased J. B. Lippincott & Co. from HarperCollins. The company acquired Liber, a Swedish educational publishing company, in 1993. The following year, it established its first Eastern European subsidiary, IURA Edition, in Bratislava, Slovakia. The company acquired Jugend & Volk, Dalian, Fateco Fîrlag and Juristfîrlaget, Deutscher Kommunal-Verlag Dr. Naujoks & Behrendt, and Colex Data in 1995. Wolters Kluwer was operating in 16 countries and had approximately 8000 employees by the end of that year.

In 1994, Wolters Kluwer expanded its US legal business by acquiring Prentice Hall Law & Business from Simon & Schuster. In 1995, Wolters Kluwer acquired CT Corporation. The following year, it purchased CCH Inc., a tax and business materials publisher, for $1.9 billion. The purchase assisted in expanding the company's business in Asia because of CCH Inc.'s involvement in Australia, New Zealand, Japan, Singapore, and Hong Kong. It also purchased Little, Brown and Company's medical and legal division that year. John Wiley & Son's legal division was purchased in 1997. Waverly, Inc., Ovid Technologies, Inc. and Plenum Publishing Corporation were acquired in 1998 to develop Wolters Kluwer's medical and scientific publishing industry.

=== 2000s ===
In 2002, Wolters Kluwer sold Kluwer Academic Publishers to the private equity firms Cinven and Candover Investments. (It is now part of Springer). The company established its first three-year strategy to deliver sustained value to customers and shareholders in 2003. The New Delhi Wolters Kluwer Health office opened in 2006. In 2007, Wolters Kluwer Education was sold to Bridgepoint Capital. In September 2008, Wolters Kluwer acquired UpToDate, an evidence-based electronic clinical information resource. The following month, the company received a multi-year contract to provide prescription and patient-level data to the United States Food and Drug Administration. In 2009, Wolters Kluwer was named the "Best Place to Work" in Spain by the Great Place to Work Institute.

=== 2010s–2020s ===
Wolters Kluwer Deutschland, the German subsidiary of the company, launched Legal Tribune Online in April 2010. The online magazine, which provides German-language news and analysis about current developments in law and related subjects, ranked among the top 20 most visited online professional journals. In September of that year, Wolters Kluwer acquired FRSGlobal, a financial regulatory reporting and risk management firm.

The company acquired SASGAS, a provider of financial reporting software to banks in China, in October 2011. That December, Wolters Kluwer acquired Medknow, an open access publisher. Also in 2011, Wolters Kluwer sold its pharmaceutical industry-related Marketing and Publishing Service division to Springer Science+Business Media, which led to a workforce reduction at its facility in Ambler, Pennsylvania, eventually leading to the site's closure in 2013.

In 2012, Wolters Kluwer acquired Acclipse, an accounting software provider, and Finarch, makers of a platform for financial institutions to manage data, compliance, and risk. The company's health division tested technology to identify and treat sepsis in December. Wolters Kluwer acquired Health Language, a medical terminology management provider, in January 2013. In May 2013, the company acquired Prosoft Tecnologia, a Brazilian tax and accounting software provider. It also acquired CitizenHawk, an American online brand protection and global domain recovery company, in September 2013. That same month, Wolters Kluwer acquired Svenson, an Austrian regulatory reporting provider. This acquisition enabled both companies to assist Austrian banks and insurance companies in meeting national and international regulatory requirements.

The company became the fifth participant in the AAISalliance, an arrangement of information providers that make their services available for member insurance companies of the American Association of Insurance Services (AAIS) in April 2014. In May 2014, Wolters Kluwer launched UpToDate, a clinical decision support resource, in the United Kingdom. UpToDate was launched throughout Western Europe a month later. Wolters Kluwer acquired Datacert, a Houston, Texas-based enterprise legal management software and services provider in April 2014.

The company partnered with Anhembi Morumbi University, a private university in São Paulo, Brazil, to provide information and resources to healthcare students and professionals in June 2014. That same year, the company's CCH eSign software won the CPA Practice Advisor Magazine's Tax & Accounting Technology Innovation Award, as well as the Software and Information Industry Association's Best Enterprise Mobile Application Award. The company partnered with Broadridge Tax Services in August 2014 to facilitate tax reporting and reconciliation. In September, the company's UpToDate resource was released in Latin America. That month the company extended its partnership with the American Internal Revenue Service. The year 2014 marked the 15th year of their collaboration. In May 2016, the company acquired Enablon, a provider of sustainability and operational risk management software. Wolters Kluwer Legal & Regulatory sold Croner Group to Peninsula Business Services in 2016, and sold Croner-i to Peninsula in 2017.

In the United States, Wolters Kluwer's Legal & Regulatory Education (the education division of Wolters Kluwer Legal & Regulatory U.S.) published casebooks and legal textbooks through its Aspen Publisher's, Inc. marquee. In 2021, Transom Capital Group purchased the Education division for US$88 million, renaming the entire operation as the standalone Aspen Publishing.

In June 2022, Wolters Kluwer signed and completed an agreement to acquire Level Programs S.L., a provider of legal practice management software in Spain.

Wolters Kluwer launched new TeamMate+ for internal controls and assurance professionals on 17 July 2025.

== Operations ==
The company operates under five divisions as of 2026:

- Legal & Regulatory
- Tax & Accounting
- Health
- Financial & Corporate Compliance
- Corporate Performance & ESG

== Sustainability ==
Wolters Kluwer is listed on the Dow Jones Sustainability Index. The company received the Bronze Class Sustainability Award 2014 from RobecoSAM. Wolters Kluwer is recognized as one of the "Global 100 Most Sustainable Corporations in the World" by Corporate Knights.

== Lawsuits and criticism ==
In September 2024, Lucina Uddin, a neuroscience professor at UCLA, sued Wolters Kluwer along with five other academic journal publishers in a proposed class-action lawsuit, alleging that the publishers violated antitrust law by agreeing not to compete against each other for manuscripts and by denying scholars payment for peer review services.

In 2026, Retraction Watch published an investigation into the International Journal of Surgery, (which had been purchased by Wolters-Kluwer in 2022) which alleged that the journal had mandated during peer review that papers submitted to the journal cited papers published in the International Journal of Surgery by its editor Riaz Agha (a form of citation manipulation to boost the journal's ranking), as well as use a paid research registry that Agha owned. In response, Clarivate's widely used Web of Science database "paused coverage of new content" from the journal, and Wolters Kluwer removed the citation and registry requirements from the journal.

== See also ==
- Books in the Netherlands
- Croner Group (a subsidiary from 1977 to 2015)
- European Business Law Review
