= New County Hotel fire =

Fire in central Perth, Scotland

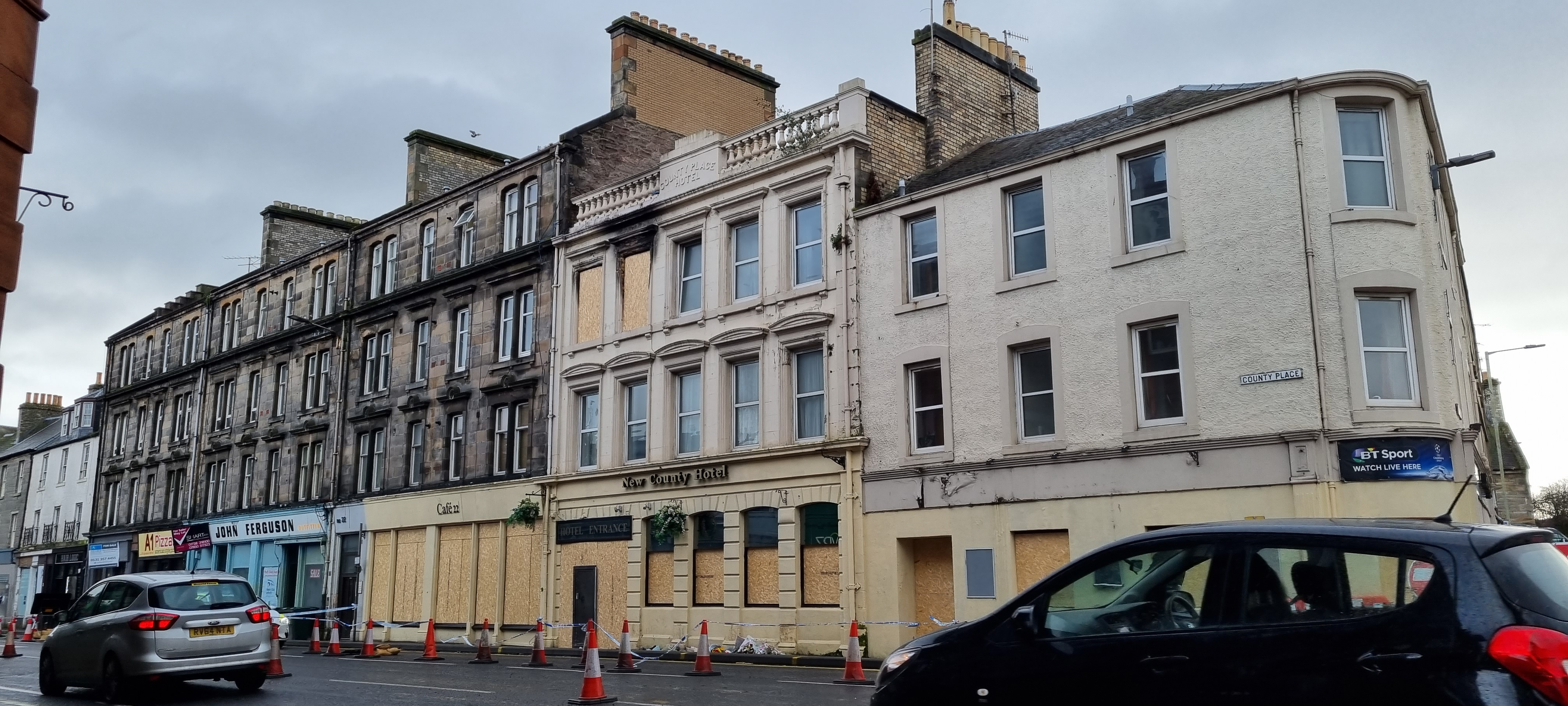
- The hotel around a month after the fire
- Date: 2 January 2023
- Location: Perth, Scotland; 56.3952°N 3.4359°W
- Deaths: 3
- Injuries: 11

On 2 January 2023, a fire broke out at New County Hotel in Perth, Scotland. It killed three people and one dog, and injured eleven other people.

== Background ==
New County Hotel (formerly County Place Hotel) is a three-star hotel on County Place in central Perth. The hotel had previously had a fire in August 2016. The fire was caused by a malfunctioning dishwasher; guests were evacuated and suffered no injuries.

The hotel is managed by the Edwin Hotels Group, which is owned by Rashid Hussain, a British businessman supposedly based in Dubai. Hussain previously owned the Melbourne Ardenlea, a hotel on the Isle of Wight that was shut after an official report stated there was risk of “serious personal injury with the danger of fire, explosion, gas leaks and carbon monoxide”. The hotel was later reopened.

On 12 December 2022, a fire safety audit was carried out at New County Hotel by the Croner Group on behalf of the Scottish Fire and Rescue Service. The audit said that the measures at the time were not substantial enough; they listed 29 issues with the building. The report included issues with emergency doors, escapes and lighting. The hotel was ordered to fix the issues within 28 days.

Perth and Kinross Council had previously issued three health and safety warnings to the hotel. The warnings highlighted problems with flooring and windows in the hotel.

Previous guests of the hotel had raised their own concerns about the safety of the hotel. Some said that the hotel had ignored previous warnings about risks, while others were concerned about fire safety due to cigarette butts being left in corridors. Deputy First Minister John Swinney had previously encouraged hotel guests to speak out about issues they found.

Fire death is relatively uncommon in Scotland. The fire at New County Hotel was the country's first case of fire death in over five years. The last case was the Cameron House fire, which killed two people in December 2017.

== Incident ==
Around 5:10 a.m. on 2 January 2023, reports were made to Police Scotland of a fire on the second floor of New County Hotel in Perth. Emergency services arrived at the hotel around 5:12 a.m., including 60 firefighters (in nine fire engines) and 21 ambulances. Police Scotland evacuated the 16 people from the hotel and two people from the surrounding buildings. Citizens were asked to avoid the area around the hotel. Fires were fully extinguished by 6:30 a.m., but two fire engines remained on site to check the hotel.

== Aftermath ==
Three people were confirmed dead from the incident, as well as a dog. The Scottish Ambulance Service treated eleven people for minor injuries. The bodies of the people killed were taken away from the site in a private ambulance before noon. Perth and Kinross Council closed four roads around the hotel to prevent further harm to civilians, impacting traffic flow due to the hotel's central location. The three victims were named on 6 January by Police Scotland.

The manager of New County Hotel filed an employment tribunal against Rashid Hussain following the fire. Hussain died in 2023, aged 59.

== Investigation ==
Police and Fire services started an investigation into the incident after gaining control of the fire. Police stated that a report would be sent to the procurator fiscal service. The Deputy Leader of Perth and Kinross council, Cllr. Eric Drysdale, urged people to stay away from the scene so the investigation could be successful.

In February 2025, it was reported that the investigation had extended to London, where they questioned a former employee of Hussain.
