= Insurance policy =

Contract between the insurer and the insured

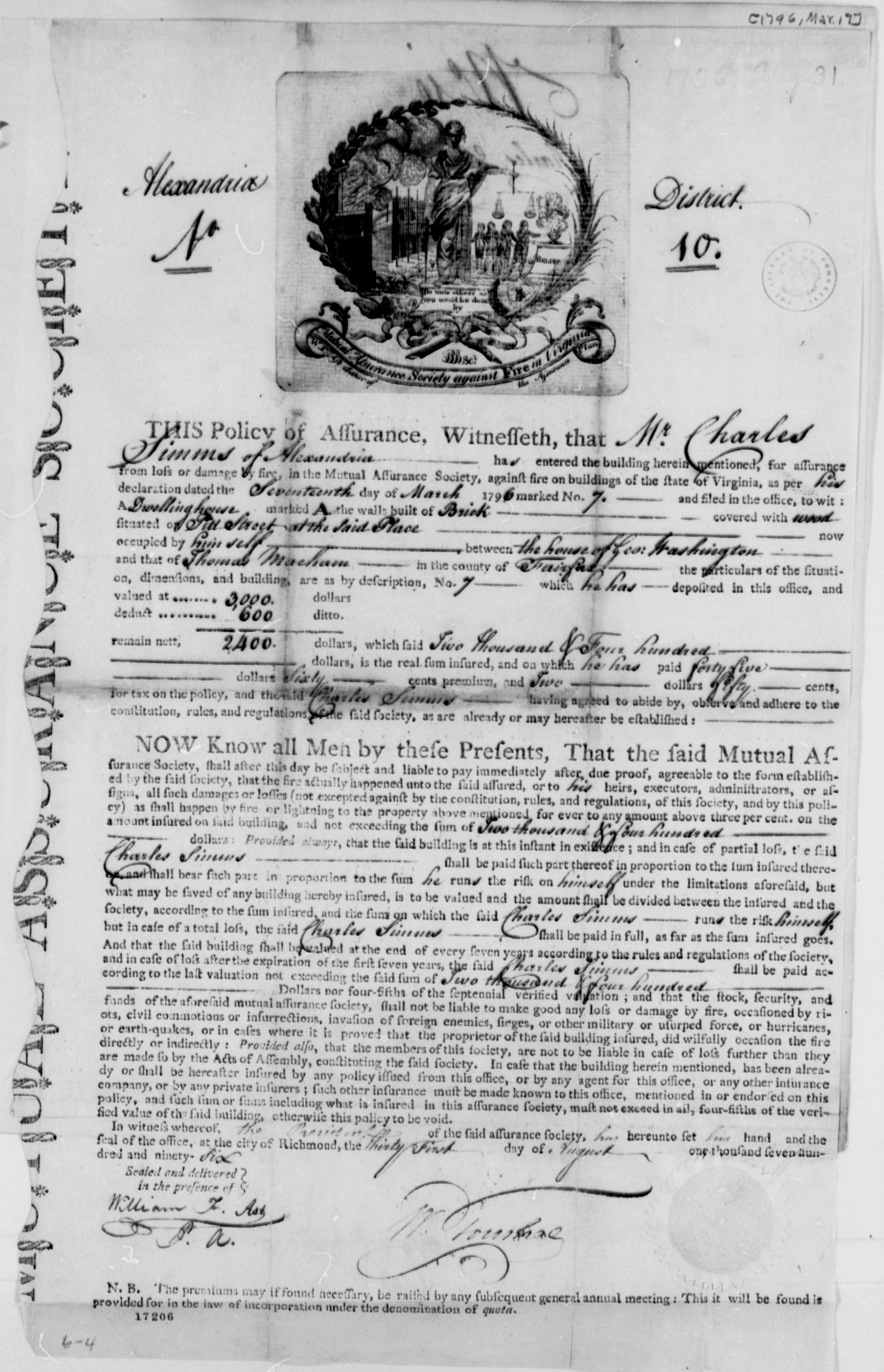
Charles Simms, March 17, 1796, Fire Insurance Policy

In insurance, the insurance policy is a contract (generally a standard form contract) between the insurer and the policyholder, which determines the claims which the insurer is legally required to pay. In exchange for an initial payment, known as the premium, the insurer promises to pay for loss caused by perils covered under the policy language.

Insurance contracts are designed to meet specific needs and thus have many features not found in many other types of contracts. Since insurance policies are standard forms, they feature boilerplate language which is similar across a wide variety of different types of insurance policies.

The insurance policy is generally an integrated contract, meaning that it includes all forms associated with the agreement between the insured and insurer. In some cases, however, supplementary writings such as letters sent after the final agreement can make the insurance policy a non-integrated contract. One insurance textbook states that generally "courts consider all prior negotiations or agreements ... every contractual term in the policy at the time of delivery, as well as those written afterward as policy riders and endorsements ... with both parties' consent, are part of the written policy". The textbook also states that the policy must refer to all papers which are part of the policy. Oral agreements are subject to the parol evidence rule, and may not be considered part of the policy if the contract appears to be whole. Advertising materials and circulars are typically not part of a policy. Oral contracts pending the issuance of a written policy can occur.

== General features ==
The insurance contract or agreement is a contract whereby the insurer promises to pay benefits to the insured or on their behalf to a third party if certain defined events occur. Subject to the "fortuity principle", the event must be uncertain. The uncertainty can be either as to when the event will happen (e.g. in a life insurance policy, the time of the insured's death is uncertain) or as to if it will happen at all (e.g. in a fire insurance policy, whether or not a fire will occur at all).

For individuals, separate insurance policies for home buildings and contents, travel, life cover and motor insurance are common. (Note: The UK charity Christian Aid suggested in 2019 that families could donate money to charities reflecting the number of distinct insurance policies they held.)

- Insurance contracts are generally considered contracts of adhesion because the insurer draws up the contract and the insured has little or no ability to make material changes to it. This is interpreted to mean that the insurer bears the burden if there is any ambiguity in any terms of the contract. Insurance policies are sold without the policyholder even seeing a copy of the contract. In 1970 Robert Keeton suggested that many courts were actually applying 'reasonable expectations' rather than interpreting ambiguities, which he called the 'reasonable expectations doctrine'. This doctrine has been controversial, with some courts adopting it and others explicitly rejecting it. In several United States jurisdictions, including California, Wyoming, and Pennsylvania, the insured is bound by clear and conspicuous terms in the contract even if the evidence suggests that the insured did not read or understand them.
- Insurance contracts are aleatory in that the amounts exchanged by the insured and insurer are unequal and depend upon uncertain future events. In contrast, ordinary non-insurance contracts are commutative in that the amounts (or values) exchanged are usually intended by the parties to be roughly equal. This distinction is particularly important in the context of exotic products such as finite risk insurance that contain "commutation" provisions.
- Insurance contracts are unilateral, meaning that only the insurer makes legally enforceable promises in the contract. The insured is not required to pay the premiums, but the insurer is required to pay the benefits under the contract if the insured has paid the premiums and met certain other basic provisions.
- Insurance contracts are governed by the principle of utmost good faith (uberrima fides), which requires both parties of the insurance contract to deal in good faith and in particular, imparts on the insured a duty to disclose all material facts that relate to the risk to be covered. This contrasts with the legal doctrine that covers most other types of contracts, caveat emptor (let the buyer beware). In the United States, the insured can sue an insurer in tort for acting in bad faith.

== Structure ==
Insurance contracts were traditionally written on the basis of every single type of risk (where risks were defined extremely narrowly), and a separate premium was calculated and charged for each. Only those individual risks expressly described or "scheduled" in the policy were covered; hence, those policies are now described as "individual" or "schedule" policies. This system of "named perils" or "specific perils" coverage proved to be unsustainable in the context of the Second Industrial Revolution, in that a typical large conglomerate might have dozens of types of risks to insure against. For example, in 1926, an insurance industry spokesman noted that a bakery would have to buy a separate policy for each of the following risks: manufacturing operations, elevators, teamsters, product liability, contractual liability (for a spur track connecting the bakery to a nearby railroad), premises liability (for a retail store), and owners' protective liability (for negligence of contractors hired to make any building modifications).

In 1941, the insurance industry began to shift to the current system where covered risks are initially defined broadly in an "all risk" or "all sums" insuring agreement on a general policy form (e.g., "We will pay all sums that the insured becomes legally obligated to pay as damages..."), then narrowed down by subsequent exclusion clauses (e.g., "This insurance does not apply to..."). If the insured desires coverage for a risk taken out by an exclusion on the standard form, the insured can sometimes pay an additional premium for an endorsement to the policy that overrides the exclusion.

Insurers have been criticized in some quarters for the development of complex policies with layers of interactions between coverage clauses, conditions, exclusions, and exceptions to exclusions. In a case interpreting one ancestor of the modern "products-completed operations hazard" clause, the Supreme Court of California complained:

The instant case presents yet another illustration of the dangers of the present complex structuring of insurance policies. Unfortunately the insurance industry has become addicted to the practice of building into policies one condition or exception upon another in the shape of a linguistic Tower of Babel. We join other courts in decrying a trend which both plunges the insured into a state of uncertainty and burdens the judiciary with the task of resolving it. We reiterate our plea for clarity and simplicity in policies that fulfill so important a public service.

== Parts of an insurance contract ==
The 69 printed conditions on the back of an 1882 fire-insurance policy issued by the Northern Insurance Society in the Russian Empire.

- Declarations - Identifies who is an insured, the insured's address, the insuring company, what risks or property are covered, the policy limits (amount of insurance), any applicable deductibles, the policy number, the policy period, and the premium amount. These are usually provided on a form that is filled out by the insurer based on the insured's application and attached on top of or inserted within the first few pages of the policy.
- Definitions - Defines important terms used in the rest of the policy.
- Insuring agreement - Describes the covered perils, or risks assumed, or nature of coverage. This is where the insurance company makes one or more express promises to indemnify the insured.
- Exclusions - Takes coverage away from the insuring agreement by describing property, perils, hazards or losses arising from specific causes which are not covered by the policy.
- Conditions - These are specific provisions, rules of conduct, duties, and obligations that the insured must comply with in order for coverage to incept or must remain in compliance with in order to keep coverage in effect. If policy conditions are not met, the insurer can deny the claim.
- Policy form - The definitions, insuring agreement, exclusions, and conditions are typically combined into a single integrated document called a policy form. Some insurers call it a coverage form or coverage part. When multiple coverage forms are packaged into a single policy, the declarations will state as much, and then there may be additional declarations specific to each coverage form. Traditionally, policy forms have been so rigidly standardized that they have no blank spaces to be filled in. Instead, they always expressly refer to terms or amounts stated in the declarations. If the policy needs to be customized beyond what is possible with the declarations, then the underwriter attaches endorsements or riders.
- Endorsements - Additional forms attached to the policy that modify it in some way, either unconditionally or upon the existence of some condition. Endorsements can make policies difficult to read for nonlawyers; they may revise, expand, or delete clauses located many pages earlier in one or more coverage forms, or even modify each other. Because it is very risky to allow nonlawyer underwriters to directly rewrite policy forms with word processors, insurers usually direct underwriters to modify them by attaching endorsements preapproved by counsel for various common modifications.
- Riders - A rider is used to convey the terms of a policy amendment and the amendment thereby becomes part of the policy. Riders are dated and numbered so that both insurer and policyholder can determine provisions and the benefit level. Common riders to group medical plans involve name changes, change to eligible classes of employees, change in level of benefits, or the addition of a managed care arrangement such as a Health Maintenance Organization or Preferred Provider Organization (PPO).
- Jackets - The term has several distinct and confusing meanings. In general, it refers to some set of standard boilerplate provisions which accompanies all policies at the time of delivery. Some insurers refer to a package of standard documents shared across an entire family of policies as a "jacket." Some insurers extend this to include policy forms, so that the only parts of the policy not part of the jacket are the declarations, endorsements, and riders. Other insurers use the term "jacket" in a manner closer to its ordinary meaning: a binder, envelope, or presentation folder with pockets in which the policy may be delivered, or a cover sheet to which the policy forms are stapled or which is stapled on top of the policy. The standard boilerplate provisions are then printed on the jacket itself.

== Industry standard forms ==
In the United States, property and casualty insurers typically use similar or even identical language in their standard insurance policies, which are drafted by advisory organizations such as the Insurance Services Office and the American Association of Insurance Services. This reduces the regulatory burden for insurers as policy forms must be approved by states; it also allows consumers to more readily compare policies, albeit at the expense of consumer choice. In addition, as policy forms are reviewed by courts, the interpretations become more predictable as courts elaborate upon the interpretation of the same clauses in the same policy forms, rather than different policies from different insurers.

In recent years, however, insurers have increasingly modified the standard forms in company-specific ways or declined to adopt changes to standard forms. For example, a review of home insurance policies found substantial differences in various provisions. In some areas such as directors and officers liability insurance and personal umbrella insurance there is little industry-wide standardization.

=== Manuscript policies and endorsements ===
For the vast majority of insurance policies, the only page that is heavily custom-written to the insured's needs is the declarations page. All other pages are standard forms that refer back to terms defined in the declarations as needed. However, certain types of insurance, such as media insurance, are written as manuscript policies, which are either custom-drafted from scratch or written from a mix of standard and nonstandard forms. By analogy, policy endorsements that are not written on standard forms or whose language is custom-written to fit the insured's particular circumstances are known as manuscript endorsements.
