= Thomas Schlich =

Historian of medicine

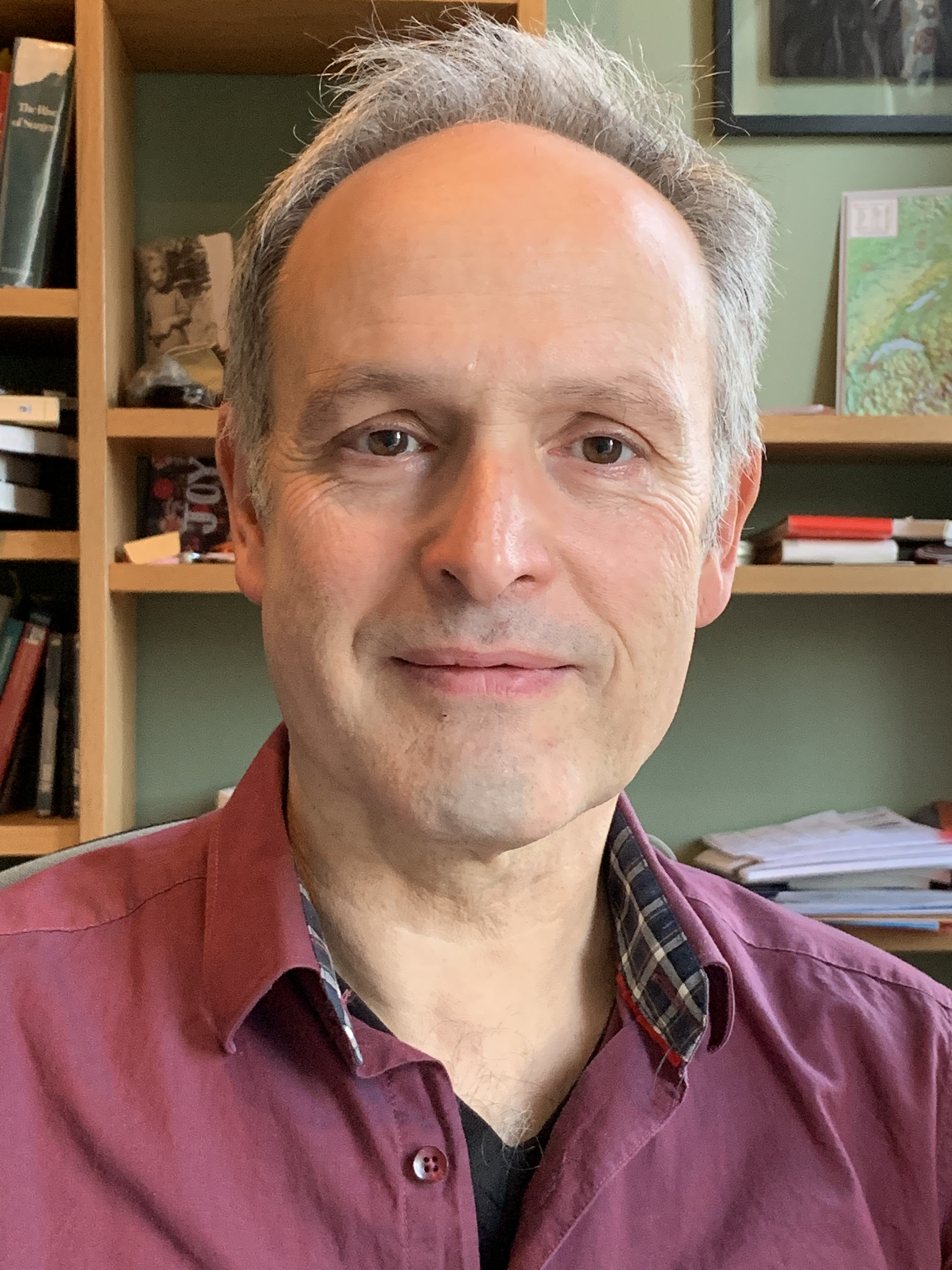
- Born: 8 June 1962 (age 64)
- Title: James McGill Professor

Academic background
- Education: University of Marburg; University of Freiburg

Academic work
- Discipline: History of medicine
- Institutions: University of Cambridge; University of Freiburg; McGill University

Thomas Schlich (born 8 June 1962) is a German-Canadian historian of medicine known for his work on the history of surgery.

== Education ==
Thomas Schlich studied medicine at the University of Marburg, Germany, and worked at the centre of internal medicine, department of Nephrology as a physician. He holds an MD research degree (1990) from the Philipps-University of Marburg, and was awarded habilitation (1998) by the Albert-Ludwigs-University of Freiburg.

== Career ==
In 1991/92 he spent a year at the Wellcome Unit for the History of Medicine, Department of History and Philosophy of Science, at the University of Cambridge, England. From 1992 to 1997 he was Research Officer at the Institute for the History of Medicine at the Robert Bosch Foundation in Stuttgart, Germany. From 1997 to 2000 he held the position of assistant professor at the Institute for the History of Medicine of the University of Freiburg, Germany. From 2000 to 2002 he held a Heisenberg Fellowship awarded by the German Research Council/Deutsche Forschungsgemeinschaft (DFG). In 2002 he moved to Montreal, Canada to take up a position as a professor at the Department of Social Studies of Medicine at McGill University, a position which he holds currently. He held a Canada Research Chair from 2002 to 2012 and has since then held the James McGill Professorship in the History of Medicine. He is department chair (head) of the Department Social Studies of Medicine (2021-).

Schlich has been a visiting scholar or professor at many institutions, including the Institute for the History of Medicine at the University of Giessen, Germany (2006), the Max Planck Institute for the History of Science, Berlin, Germany (2009/10), the École des Hautes Études en Sciences Sociales, University of Marseille, France (2016), and the Institut universitaire d’histoire de la médecine et de la santé publique, University of Lausanne, Switzerland (2016/17).

He has given various named and key note lectures, among them the Rausing Lecture in the History of Technology at Cambridge University and the Stanley R. Friesen Lecture in the History of Surgery at the University of Kansas, and the Biennial Kass Lecture in the History of Medicine at King's College London.

== Awards and honours ==
In 1991 he was awarded the prize conferred by the 'Universitätsbund Marburg' for the best dissertation on the subject of the history of the university, and the Harold Ellis Prize in 2007 awarded by the International Journal of Surgery. He is a Fellow of the Royal Society of Canada (FRSC) and a Fellow of the Canadian Academy of Health Sciences.

== Editorial board ==
He presently serves on the editorial boards the monograph series “Forschungen zur Kultur der Medizin. Geschichte – Theorie – Ethik” [Studies on Culture and Medicine. History – Theory – Ethics], Notes and Records: The Royal Society Journal of the History of Science.

== Research ==
His research interests include the history of modern medicine and science (18th-21st centuries), medicine and technology, history of medical innovation, and body history, with a special focus on the history of modern surgery (1800 to the present time).

Most of his recent publications contribute to his research project “Cutting into the Living Body: The Emergence of Modern Surgery, 1800-1914”. This research looks at two issues: the history of the rationale of modern surgery—why surgeons open up their patient's living bodies to restore their health; and the practices of modern surgery—how surgeons have learned to repair structures within the living body, and making sure that the patient survives.

== Selected publications ==
- Bruno J. Strasser and Thomas Schlich, The Mask. A History of Breathing Bad Air, New Haven: Yale University Press 2025. A history of masks protecting against bad air—in cities, factories, hospitals, and war trenches—exploring how our identities and beliefs shape the decision to wear a mask
- Marburger jüdische Chirurgie- und Medizinstudenten von 1800-1832. Herkunft - Berufsweg - Stellung in der Gesellschaft, Marburg: Elwert 1990; a collective biography of the first generation of Jewish medical students at the University of Marburg, Germany (1800–1833).
- Transplantation: Geschichte, Medizin, Ethik der Organverpflanzung, Munich: C.H. Beck 1998, ISBN 9783406433009. Concerning transplantation, its science, practice, and ethics.
- Surgery, Science and Industry: A Revolution in Fracture Care, 1950s-1990s, Houndsmills, Basingstoke: Palgrave 2002, ISBN 9780333993057. A case history of surgical innovation; explains how the technology of fixing broken bones with metal implants such as plates and screws (osteosynthesis) spread globally in the 1950s to 1990s, despite its technical complexity, scientific uncertainty and riskiness.
- The Origins of Organ Transplantation: The History of Surgical Organ Replacement, 1880s-1930s, Rochester, NY: University of Rochester Press, 2010, ISBN 9781580463539. The first comprehensive account of the origins of modern transplants; analyzes how doctors and scientists between 1880 and 1930 developed the rationale and the technology for performing surgical organ replacement.
- Editor with Christopher Crenner: Technological Change in Modern Surgery: Historical Perspectives on Innovation, Rochester, NY: University of Rochester Press, 2017, ISBN 9781580465946. The edited volume looks at various ways of explaining innovation in surgery by going beyond the conceptual framework of innovation history and considering the wider technological, social, cultural, and economic conditions.
- Palgrave Handbook of the History of Surgery (2018) (editor), ISBN 9781349952601. Covers the technical, social and cultural history of surgery. The individual entries in the handbook offer starting points for up-to-date information about an area in the history of surgery for research and general orientation. Written by 26 experts from 6 countries, the chapters discuss the essential topics of the field (such as anaesthesia, wound infection, instruments, specialization), specific domains areas (for example, cancer surgery, transplants, animals, war), but also innovative themes (women, popular culture, nursing, clinical trials) and make connections to other areas of historical research (such as the history of emotions, art, architecture, colonial history).
