= CAAH =

CAAH may refer to:

- Canadian Association for Adolescent Health, a multidisciplinary, non-profit advocacy organization based in Montreal, Quebec
- Community Action Against Homophobia, a community activist organisation based in Sydney, Australia
- Classical Archaeology and Ancient History, a three-year degree taken at the University of Oxford
