= European Business Law Review =

The European Business Law Review (ISSN 0959-6941) is a law journal covering business law, broadly defined and including both European Union law and the laws of the Member States and other European countries. It is published by Kluwer Law International.
