= Peninsula Building =

Coordinates: 53.4894°N 2.2412°W

The Peninsula Building
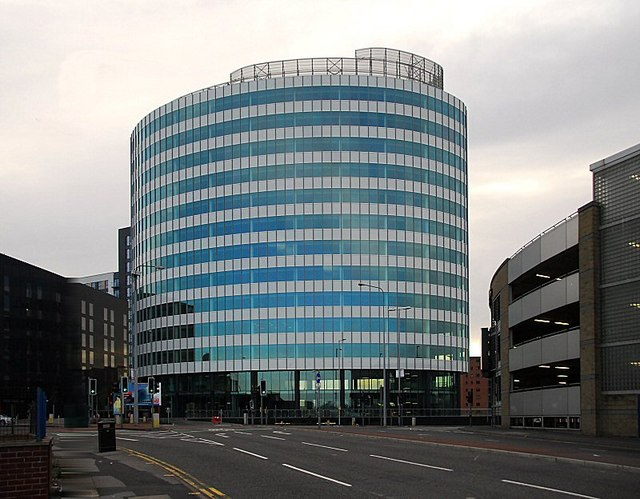
- Alternative names: City Park

General information
- Status: Completed
- Type: High rise
- Location: Manchester, England
- Current tenants: Peninsula Business Services
- Construction started: 2007
- Completed: September 2009
- Cost: £53 million

Height
- Height: 62.5 m (205 ft)

Technical details
- Floor count: 16 (4 garage levels)
- Floor area: 23,774 sq m

Design and construction
- Architect: The Manser Practice

The Peninsula Building is a high-rise commercial building in Manchester, England. The building is part of Manchester's Green Quarter, a regeneration project north-west of Manchester city centre.

== Background ==
Peninsula lies on the fringe of the city centre, opposite the Manchester Arena and Manchester Victoria station. Construction of the building began in 2007 and it opened in 2009. The Peninsula has a distinctive elliptical plan, and is clad in a glass and granite rainscreen. The building has a BREEAM rating of 'very good' and has on-site parking for up to 200 cars.

The building is the head office for Peninsula Business Services, whose subsidiary companies occupy all but one of the twelve office floors, with the British Transport Police being located on the seventh floor.

Peninsula subsidiary, BrightHR (previously called HRonline) occupy the ninth floor and an illuminated sign is visible through the front of the building. Until their demise, LateRooms.com occupied the top floors, employing 300 people at the building.

There is a vertical wind turbine on the roof of the building but this is not operational.

== See also ==
- NOMA, Manchester - a similar redevelopment scheme to the Green Quarter, adjacent to The Peninsula
