= Asca garmani =

Scientific classification
- Kingdom: Animalia
- Phylum: Arthropoda
- Subphylum: Chelicerata
- Class: Arachnida
- Order: Mesostigmata
- Family: Ascidae
- Genus: Asca
- Species: A. garmani

Binomial name
- Asca garmani Hurlbutt, 1963

Species of mite

Asca garmani is a species of mite in the family Ascidae.
