= Asca australica =

Scientific classification
- Domain: Eukaryota
- Kingdom: Animalia
- Phylum: Arthropoda
- Subphylum: Chelicerata
- Class: Arachnida
- Order: Mesostigmata
- Family: Ascidae
- Genus: Asca
- Species: A. australica

Binomial name
- Asca australica Womersley, 1956

Species of mite

Asca australica is a species of mite in the family Ascidae.
