= Asca chilensis =

Scientific classification
- Domain: Eukaryota
- Kingdom: Animalia
- Phylum: Arthropoda
- Subphylum: Chelicerata
- Class: Arachnida
- Order: Mesostigmata
- Family: Ascidae
- Genus: Asca
- Species: A. chilensis

Binomial name
- Asca chilensis Karg, 1977

Species of mite

Asca chilensis is a species of mite in the family Ascidae.

== Subspecies ==
These two subspecies belong to the species Asca chilensis:

- Asca chilensis chilensis
- Asca chilensis panamaensis Karg, 1977
