= Asca brevisetosa =

Scientific classification
- Domain: Eukaryota
- Kingdom: Animalia
- Phylum: Arthropoda
- Subphylum: Chelicerata
- Class: Arachnida
- Order: Mesostigmata
- Family: Ascidae
- Genus: Asca
- Species: A. brevisetosa

Binomial name
- Asca brevisetosa Wood, 1965

Species of mite

Asca brevisetosa is a species of mite in the family Ascidae.
