= Asca microplumosa =

Scientific classification
- Domain: Eukaryota
- Kingdom: Animalia
- Phylum: Arthropoda
- Subphylum: Chelicerata
- Class: Arachnida
- Order: Mesostigmata
- Family: Ascidae
- Genus: Asca
- Species: A. microplumosa

Binomial name
- Asca microplumosa Tseng, 1981

Species of mite

Asca microplumosa is a species of mite in the family Ascidae.
