= Association of Surgeons in Training =

UK organization

- Abbreviation: ASiT
- Formation: 1976
- Type: Professional organisation / Registered charity
- Legal status: Active
- Headquarters: United Kingdom and Ireland
- Region served: United Kingdom and Ireland
- Members: Over 2,700 surgical trainees

The Association of Surgeons in Training (ASiT) is an independent professional organisation with the stated aim of promoting excellence in surgical training. It represents over 2,700 surgical trainees from all ten surgical specialities at both regional and national levels in the United Kingdom and Ireland.

== History ==
ASiT was founded in 1976 as a forum for Senior Registrars to meet socially and discuss issues around training. It became a registered charity. ASiT is independent of the Surgical Royal Colleges, and is run by trainees, for trainees. ASiT collects input from both training organisations and the trainees, and works to improve communications between these groups whilst promoting excellence in surgical training. The organisation publishes recommendations for developing and improving surgical training, including the role of simulation.

The organisation is also vocal in the political sphere, publishing position statements and sitting on key panels and working groups for issues such as the European Working Time Directive, the Shape of Training Review and the reform of Health Education England. ASiT has a voice on the Joint Committee on Surgical Training, the Royal College of Surgeons of England Council, British Medical Association Junior Doctors Committee, and Academy of Royal Medical Colleges Trainee Doctors Group, in addition to many other Department of Health, NHS groups and specialist advisory committees. Through this, ASiT aims to improve the delivery of UK surgical training, and protect the interests and wellbeing of UK surgical trainees.

== Annual International Surgical Trainee Conference ==
ASiT organises an annual three-day international conference for doctors in surgical training with a range of pre-conference educational courses. Hosting nearly 800 delegates from the UK and abroad, it is an opportunity to discuss surgical training and present current research. Accepted abstracts are published in Elsevier's International Journal of Surgery. A conference was held in Belfast in March 2019.

Research prizes awarded include the ASiT Medal, and the SARS/ASIT Academic & Research Surgery Prize, in addition to numerous surgical specialty prizes. The ASiT Lecture is presented by a keynote speaker at the annual conference, and the Charity Gala Dinner party is the social focus for the weekend, raising money for medical charities.

== Silver Scalpel Award ==
The ASiT Silver Scalpel Award has been recognising excellence in surgical training since 2000, and is funded by Swann Morton. It is awarded annually to inspirational trainers who have scored highly across five categories: leadership, resourcefulness, training and development, professionalism, and communication.

== International Development Work ==
ASiT's 'Foundation Skills in Surgery' Course has been run throughout the UK and Ireland for several years, and teaches medical students and junior doctors the fundamental techniques required in surgery such as safe surgical practice, sterile technique, knot tying and suturing. From 2014, ASiT has begun delivering the course in international resource-poor settings ultimately aiming to develop sustainable, locally delivered training packages that can run independently of ASiT. The first teaching course was delivered in September 2014 in Kigali, Rwanda. The initiative has been supported by the Royal College of Surgeons in London and Glasgow.
