= Asca bicornis =

Scientific classification
- Domain: Eukaryota
- Kingdom: Animalia
- Phylum: Arthropoda
- Subphylum: Chelicerata
- Class: Arachnida
- Order: Mesostigmata
- Family: Ascidae
- Genus: Asca
- Species: A. bicornis

Binomial name
- Asca bicornis (Canestrini & Fanzago, 1887)

Species of mite

Asca bicornis is a species of mite in the family Ascidae. It is found in Europe.
