= Scalpel =

Sharp bladed instrument used for surgery

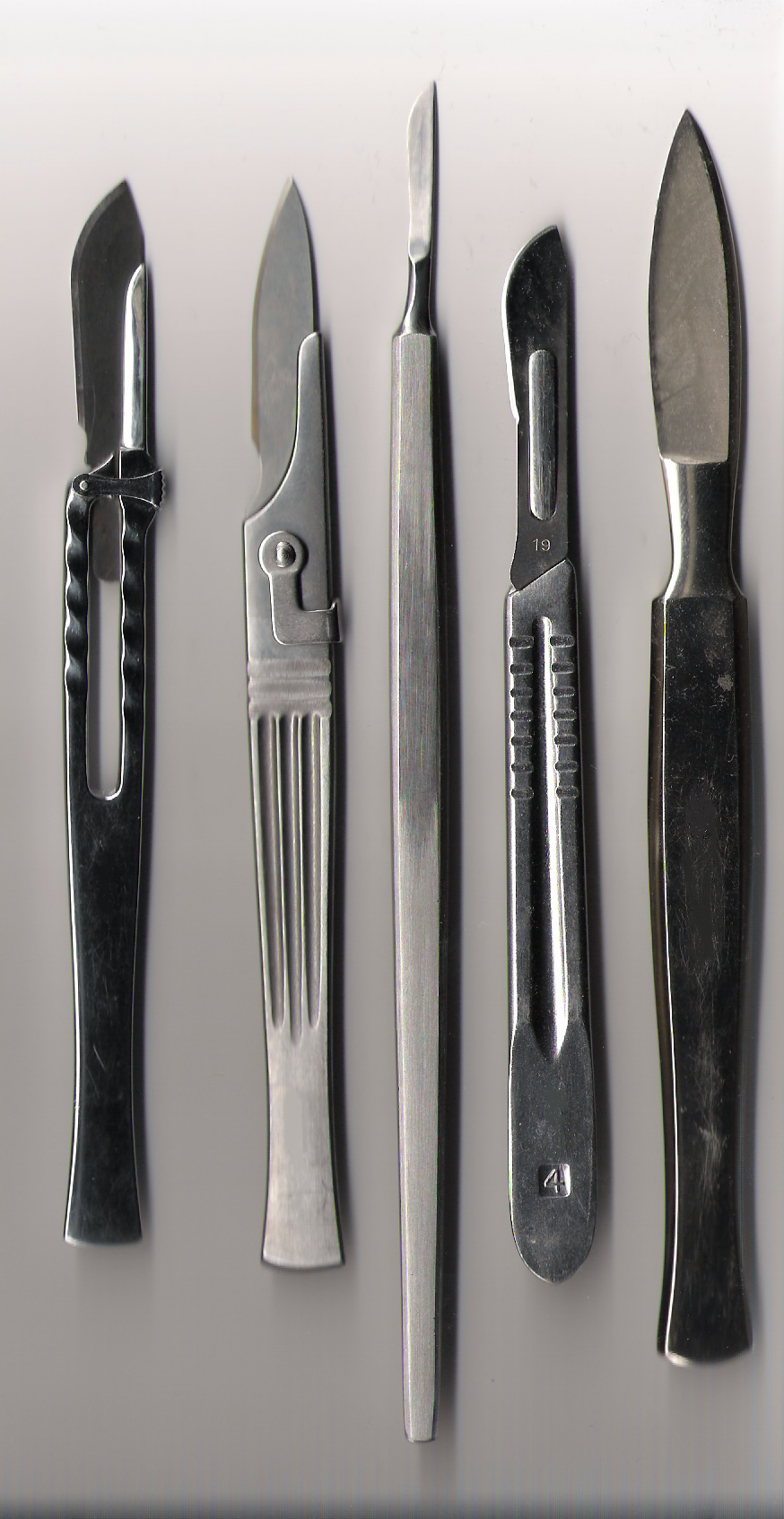
- Various scalpels. The first (from left), second, and fourth have replaceable blades. The fifth is a lancet.
- Classification: Cutting tool
- Used with: Stencil, surgery
- Related: Lancet, utility knife, laser scalpel

A scalpel or bistoury is a small and extremely sharp bladed instrument used for surgery, anatomical dissection, podiatry and various handicrafts. A lancet is a double-edged scalpel.

Scalpel blades are usually made of hardened and tempered steel, stainless steel, or high carbon steel; in addition, titanium, ceramic, diamond and even obsidian knives are not uncommon. For example, when performing surgery under MRI guidance, steel blades are unusable (the blades would be drawn to the magnets and would also cause image artifacts). Historically, the preferred material for surgical scalpels was silver. Scalpel blades are also offered by some manufacturers with a zirconium nitride–coated edge to improve sharpness and edge retention. Others manufacture blades that are polymer-coated to enhance lubricity during a cut.

Scalpels may be single-use disposable or re-usable. Re-usable scalpels can have permanently attached blades that can be sharpened or, more commonly, removable single-use blades. Disposable scalpels usually have a plastic handle with an extensible blade (like a utility knife) and are used once, then the entire instrument is discarded. Scalpel blades are usually individually packed in sterile pouches but are also offered non-sterile.

Alternatives to scalpels in surgical applications include electrocautery and lasers.

== History ==
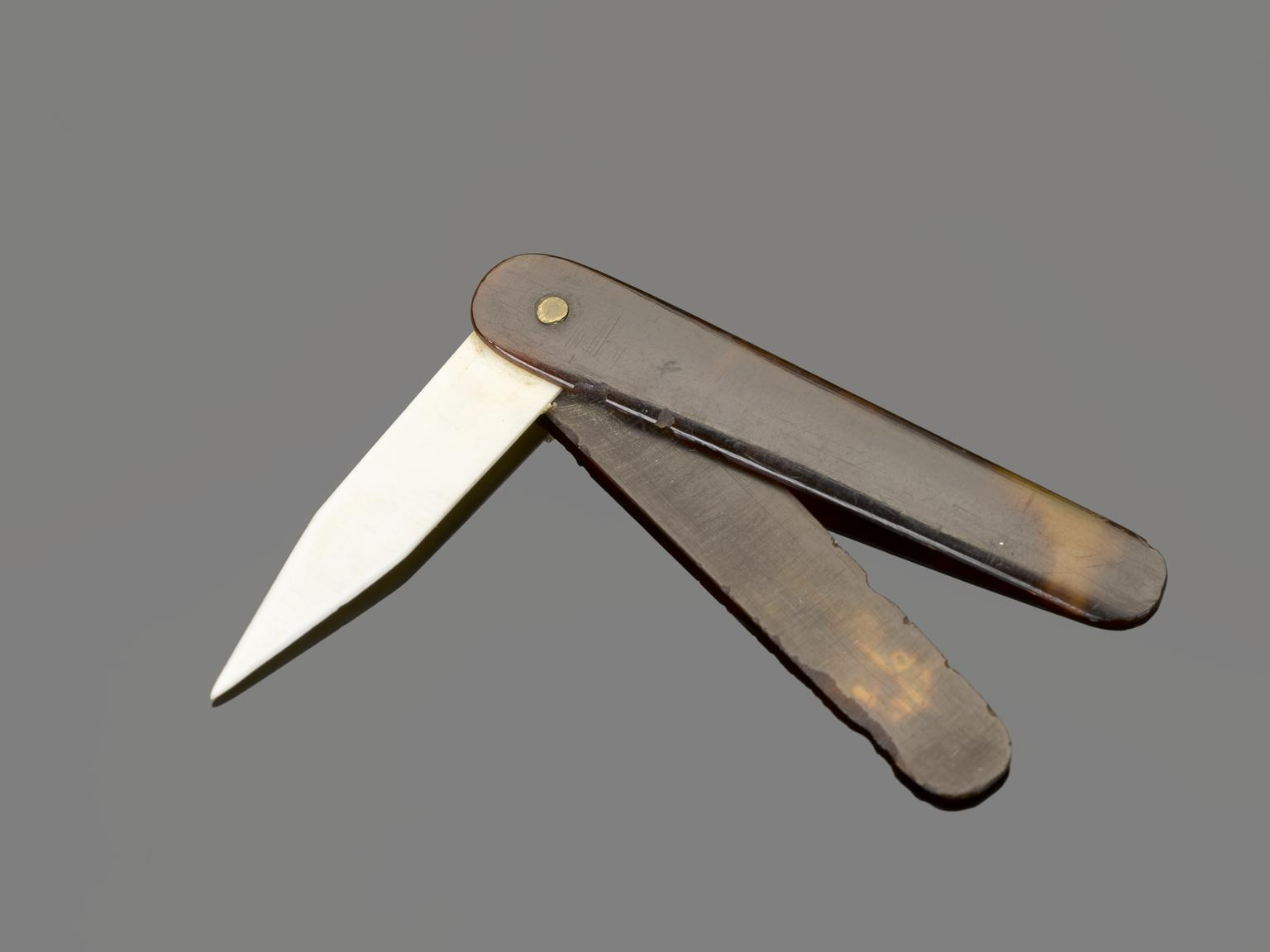
A lancet belonging to Edward Jenner

Obsidian scalpels older than 2100 BC have been found in a Bronze Age settlement in Turkey. Skulls from the same time and place show signs of brain surgery.

Ancient Egyptians made incisions for embalming with scalpels of sharpened obsidian, a material that is still in use. Modern obsidian scalpels are sharper than metal scalpels, and can safely be used on patients with metal allergies. While they are cheaper than diamond scalpels, which also have the benefits listed above, obsidian scalpels are significantly more fragile.

The first medical writings of ancient Greeks indicate they were commonly using tools identical to today's scalpels around 500 BC. The amphismela was an anatomical knife-edged on both sides. The term comes from the Greek αμφι (amphi, "on both sides"), and μελιζω (inside, "I cut").

Ancient Romans used more than 150 different surgical instruments, including scalpels.

10th century Arab-Spanish surgeon Albucasis invented a retractable scalpel.

The French used an amphismela in the 1701s.

South African scientists showed that a blunt scalpel caused sharp cuts if the blade was subjected to ultrasound. Applications might be in energy-saving paper cutting.

== Operation ==
Palmar grip

Pencil grip

In the palmar grip, also called the "dinner knife" grip, the handle is held with the second through fourth fingers and secured along the base of the thumb, with the index finger extended along the top rear of the blade and the thumb along the side of the handle. This grip is best for initial incisions and larger cuts.

In the pencil grip, best used for more accurate cuts with smaller blades (e.g. #15) and the #7 handle, the scalpel is held with the tips of the first and second fingers and the tip of the thumb with the handle resting on the fleshy base of the index finger and thumb.

== Types ==
=== Surgical ===
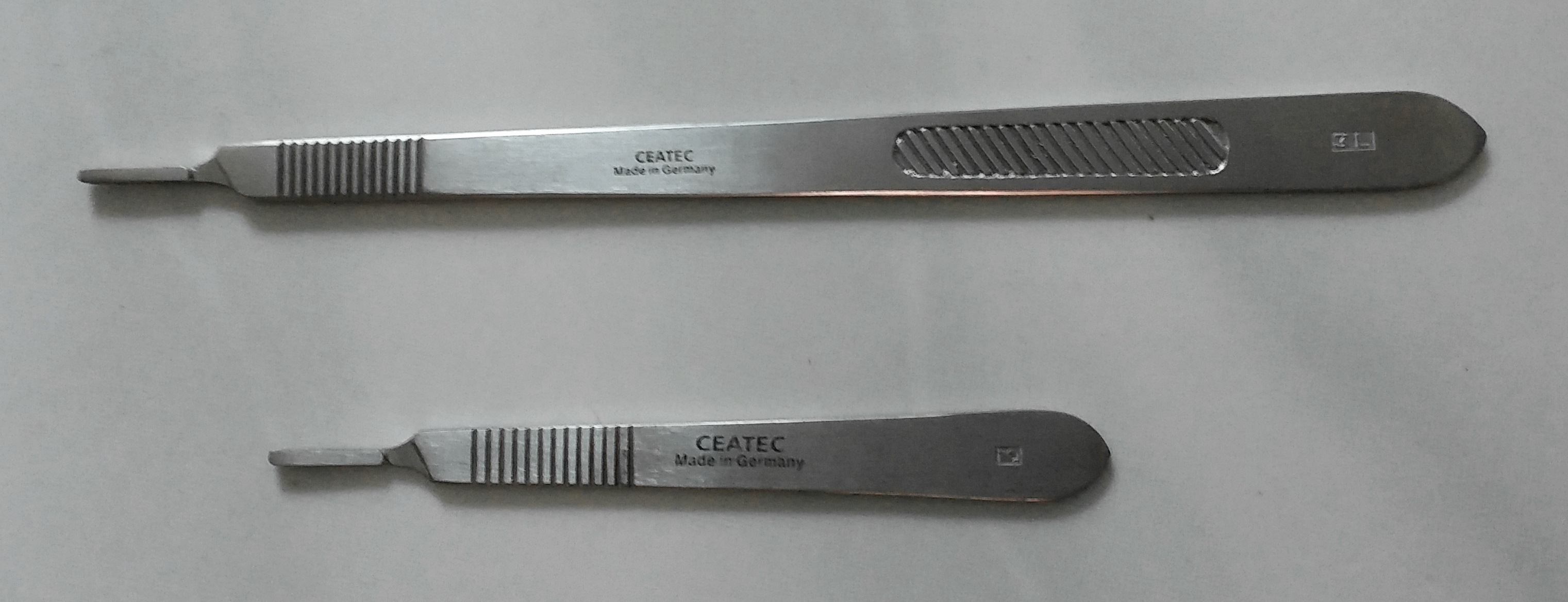
Reusable scalpel handles

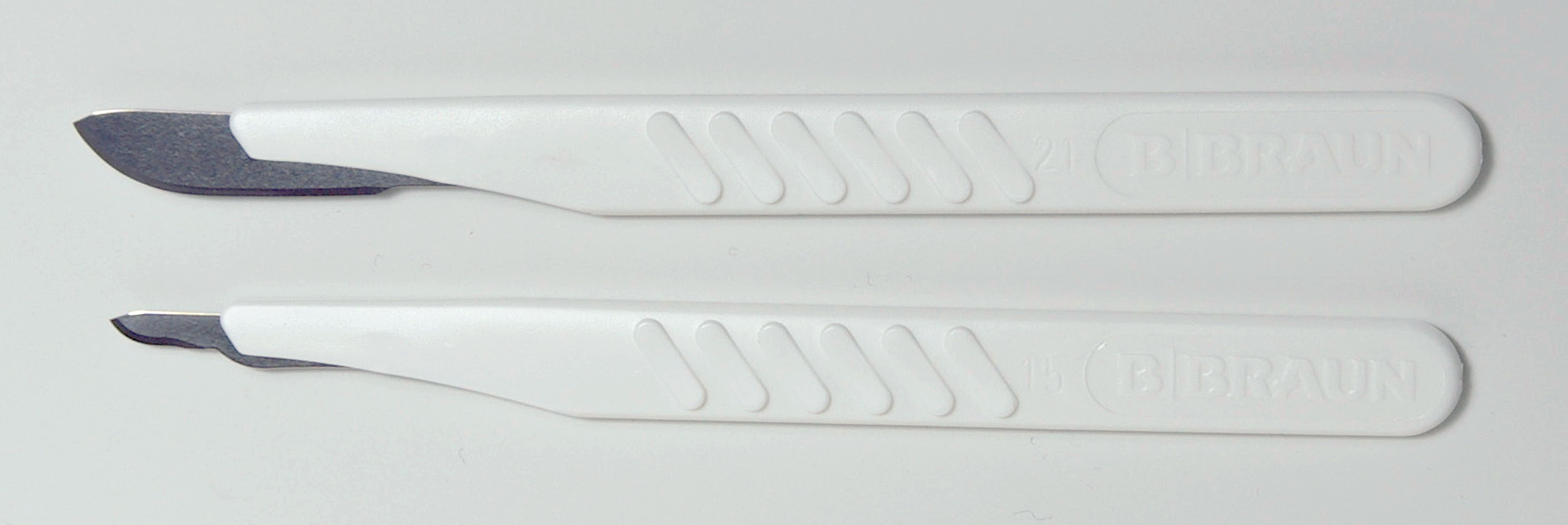
Disposable scalpels

Surgical scalpels consist of two parts, a blade and a handle. The handles are often reusable, with the blades being replaceable. In medical applications, each blade is only used once (sometimes just for a single, small cut).

The handle is also known as a "B.P. handle", named after Charles Russell Bard and Morgan Parker, founders of the Bard-Parker Company. Morgan Parker patented the 2-piece scalpel design in 1915 and Bard-Parker developed a method of cold sterilization that would not dull the blades, as did the heat-based method that was previously used.

The handle of medical scalpels come in several basic types. The first is a flat handle used in the #3 and #4 handles. The #7 handle is more like a long writing pen, rounded at the front and flat at the back. A #4 handle is larger than a #3. #5 handles are also common, and are round, with a patterning to ensure a non-slip grip. Blades are manufactured with a corresponding fitment size so that they fit on only one size handle. The following table of blades is incomplete and some blades listed may work with handles not specified here.

A lancet has a double-edged blade and a pointed end for making small incisions or drainage punctures.

=== Handicraft ===
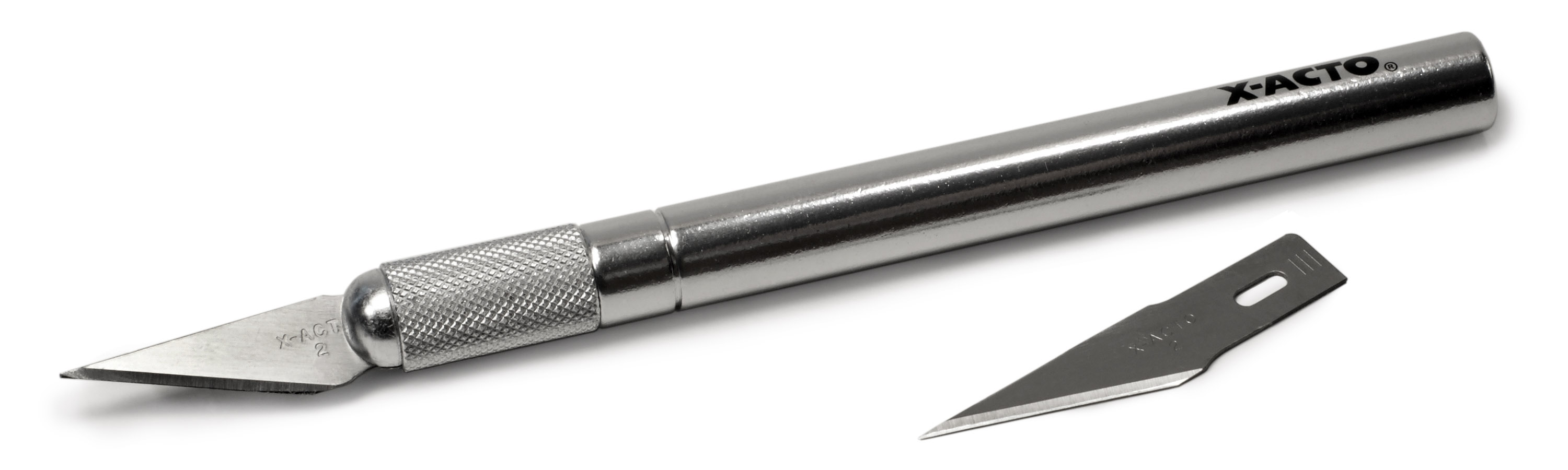
X-Acto knife

Graphical and model-making scalpels tend to have round handles, with textured grips (either knurled metal or soft plastic). The blade is usually triangular, flat and straight, allowing it to be run easily against a straightedge to produce straight cuts.

There are many kinds of graphic arts blades; the most common around the graphic design studio is the #11 blade which is very similar to a #11 surgical blade (q.v.). Other blade shapes are used for wood carving, cutting leather and heavy fabric.

== Blades ==
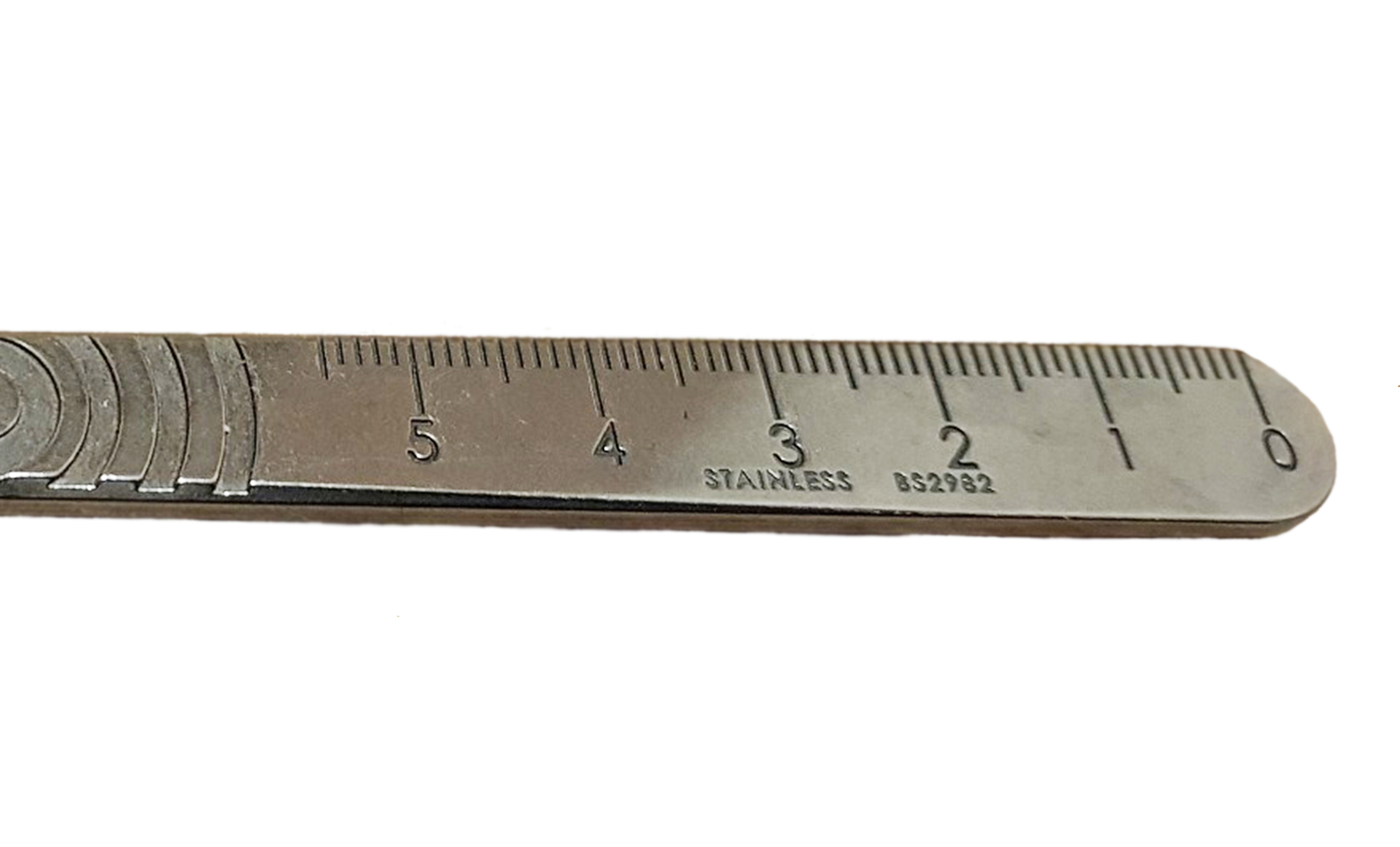
Graduated handle

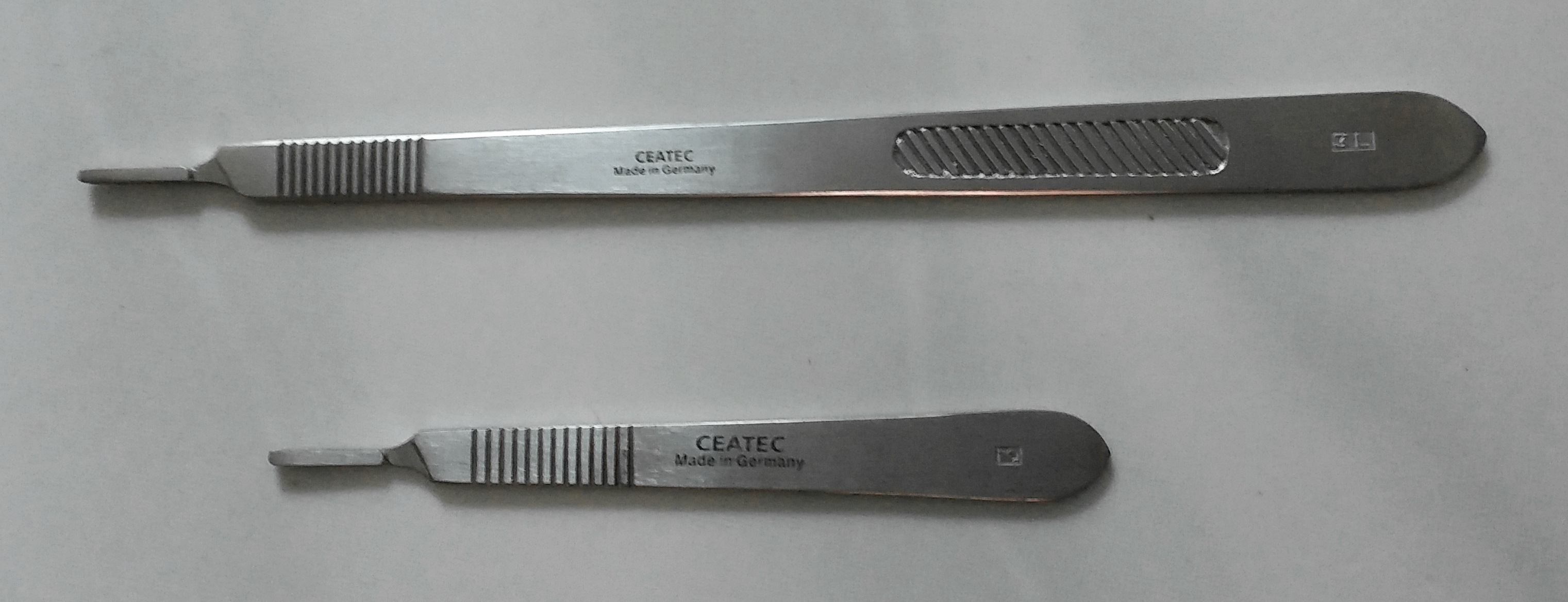
3 and 3 long handles

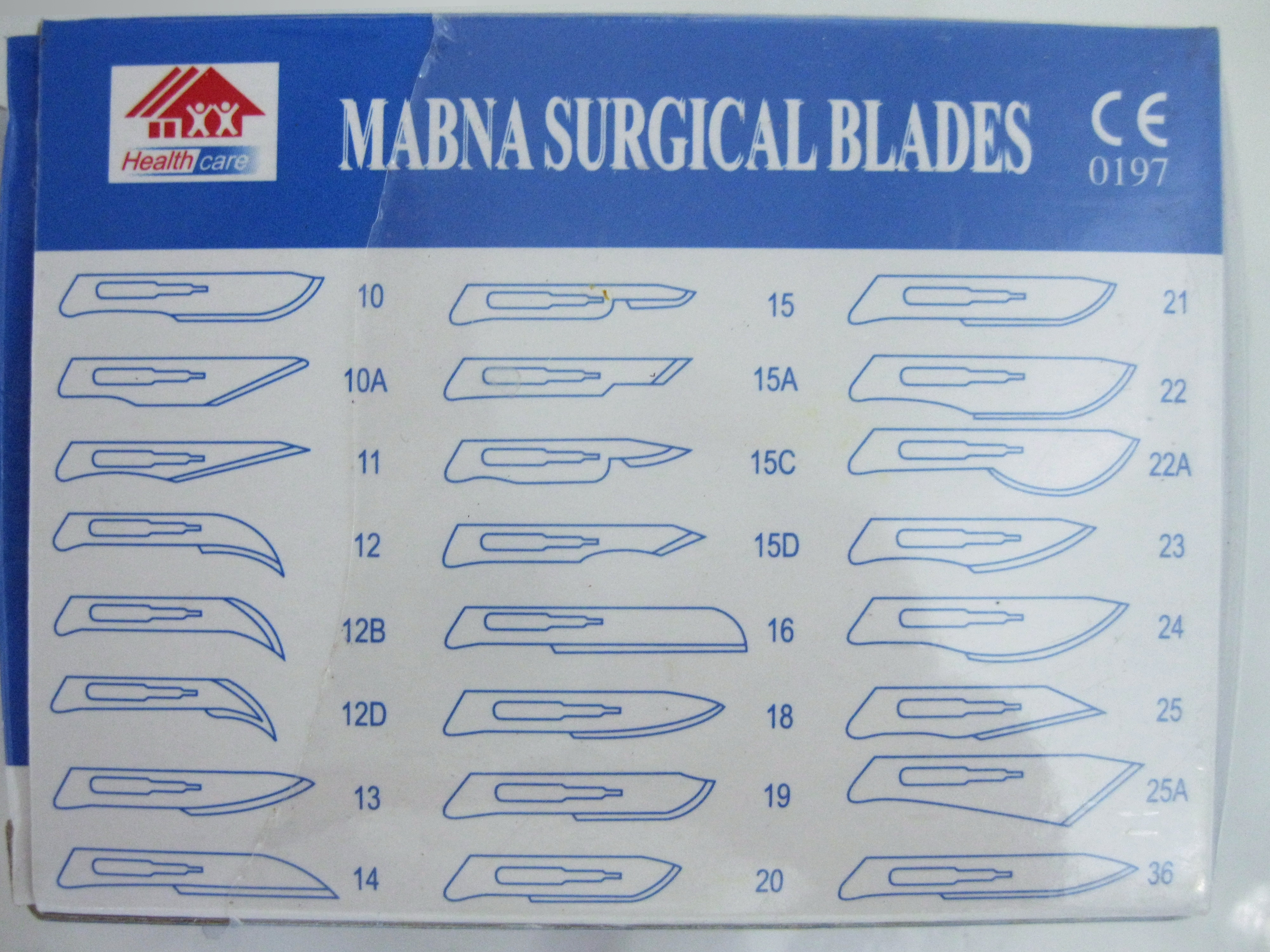
Some of the scalpel blade types used for surgery

Types of surgical scalpel blades
Blade no.	Picture	Compatible handles	Blade description	Uses
6		B3, 3, 3 Graduated, 3 Long, 5, 7, 9		
9		B3, 3, 3 Graduated, 3 Long, 5, 7, 9		
10		B3, 3, 3 Graduated, 3 Long, 5, 7, 9	Curved cutting edge with an unsharpened back edge. A more traditional blade shape.	Generally for making incisions in skin and muscle. Commonly used to cut the skin in abdominal operations.
10a		B3, 3, 3 Graduated, 3 Long, 5, 7, 9	This blade is a small and straight	
11		B3, 3, 3 Graduated, 3 Long, 5, 7, 9	Triangular blade with sharp point, flat cutting edge parallel to the handle and flat back	For precision cutting, stripping, sharp angle cuts and also stencil cutting due to its similarity to the X-Acto artknife blade
11P		B3, 3, 3 Graduated, 3 Long, 5, 7, 9		
E11		B3, 3, 3 Graduated, 3 Long, 5, 7, 9		
E/11		B3, 3, 3 Graduated, 3 Long, 5, 7, 9		Debriding hard skin for example callus by Podiatrists.
12		B3, 3, 3 Graduated, 3 Long, 5, 7, 9	A small, pointed, crescent-shaped blade sharpened on the inside edge of the curve	
12D		B3, 3, 3 Graduated, 3 Long, 5, 7, 9	A small, pointed, crescent-shaped blade sharpened on both sides of the curve	
13		B3, 3, 3 Graduated, 3 Long, 5, 7, 9		
14		B3, 3, 3 Graduated, 3 Long, 5, 7, 9		
15		B3, 3, 3 Graduated, 3 Long, 5, 7, 9	A smaller version of the #10	For the same general use as the #10 blade
15A		B3, 3, 3 Graduated, 3 Long, 5, 7, 9	A front-facing straight blade with flat back	
15C		B3, 3, 3 Graduated, 3 Long, 5, 7, 9	The #15 with a downward angle, flatter and thinner than the #15	The downward angle makes this the preferred blade for working within the chest during cardiac surgery. It is commonly used to make the distal arteriotomy during coronary artery bypass grafting.
15T		B3, 3, 3 Graduated, 3 Long, 5, 7, 9		Enucleation of lesions such as corns.
D/15		B3, 3, 3 Graduated, 3 Long, 5, 7, 9		
16		B3, 3, 3 Graduated, 3 Long, 5, 7, 9	A narrow chisel-like blade with flat, angled cutting edge, positioned higher than the axis of the handle	For cutting stencils, scoring and etching
17		B3, 3, 3 Graduated, 3 Long, 5, 7, 9	A flat face 1.6 mm chisel blade	For narrow cuts
18		4, 4 Graduated, 4 Long, 6	A 12.7 mm chisel blade	For deep cuts and scraping
19		4, 4 Graduated, 4 Long, 6	A similar blade to the #15	
20		4, 4 Graduated, 4 Long, 6	A larger version of the #10 blade, with a curved cutting edge and a flat, unsharpened back edge.	Used in general surgery and orthopaedic surgery.
21		4, 4 Graduated, 4 Long, 6		
22		2, 4, 5, 6	A slightly larger version of the #20, with a curved cutting edge and a flat, unsharpened back edge.	Used for skin incisions in both cardiac and thoracic surgery, and to cut the bronchus in lung resection surgery.
22A		4, 4 Graduated, 4 Long, 6		
23		4, 4 Graduated, 4 Long, 6	Similar to #22, leaf-shaped	For long incisions.
24		4, 4 Graduated, 4 Long, 6	A wide, flat, angled cutting edge	For corner cuts, trimming, stripping, and cutting mats and gaskets
25		4, 4 Graduated, 4 Long, 6	A front-facing straight blade with flat back (similar to #15a)	
25a		4, 4 Graduated, 4 Long, 6	A triangular straight blade with flat back edge taking a downwards angle (similar to #10a, shorter than #26)	
26		4, 4 Graduated, 4 Long, 6	A triangular straight blade with flat back edge taking a downwards angle (similar to the #15a, longer than #25a)	
27		4, 4 Graduated, 4 Long, 6		
34		4, 4 Graduated, 4 Long, 6	A triangular blade similar to the #11	
36		4, 4 Graduated, 4 Long, 6	A larger blade	Used in general surgery but also within a laboratory setting for histology and histopathology
40		B3, 3, 3 Graduated, 3 Long, 5, 7, 9		
PM40		Stainless PM Handle		
PM40B		Stainless PM Handle		
60		4, 4 Graduated, 4 Long, 6	A long blade resembling the #10 with a long cutting edge, rounded tip and flat back.	
PM60		PM8		
PM60B		PM8		

== Safety ==
Rising awareness of the dangers of sharps in a medical environment around the beginning of the 21st century led to the development of various methods of protecting healthcare workers from accidental cuts and puncture wounds. According to the Centers for Disease Control and Prevention, as many as 1,000 people were subject to accidental needle sticks and lacerations each day in the United States while providing medical care. Additionally, surgeons can expect to suffer hundreds of such injuries over the course of their career. Scalpel blade injuries were among the most frequent sharps injuries, second only to needlesticks. Scalpel injuries made up 7 percent to 8 percent of all sharps injuries in 2001.

"Scalpel Safety" is a term coined to inform users that there are choices available to them to ensure their protection from this common sharps injury.

Safety scalpels are becoming increasingly popular as their prices come down and also on account of legislation such as the Needle Stick Prevention Act, which requires hospitals to minimize the risk of pathogen transmission through needle or scalpel-related accidents.

There are essentially two kinds of disposable safety scalpels offered by various manufacturers. They can be either classified as retractable blade or retractable sheath type. The retractable blade version made by companies such as OX Med Tech, DeRoyal, Jai Surgicals, Swann-Morton, and PenBlade are more intuitive to use due to their similarities to a standard box-cutter. Retractable sheath versions have much stronger ergonomic feel for the doctors and are made by companies such as Aditya Dispomed, Aspen Surgical and Southmedic. A few companies have also started to offer a safety scalpel with a reusable metal handle. In such models, the blade is usually protected in a cartridge. Such systems usually require a custom handle and the price of blades and cartridges is considerably more than for conventional surgical blades.

There are various scalpel blade removers on the market that allows users to safely remove blades from the handle, instead of dangerously using fingers or forceps. In the medical field, when taking into account activation rates, the combination of a single-handed scalpel blade remover with a passing tray or a neutral zone was as safe and up to five times safer than a safety scalpel. There are companies which offer a single-handed scalpel blade remover that complies with regulatory requirements such as US Occupational Safety and Health Administration Standards.

The usage of both safety scalpels and a single-handed blade remover, combined with a hands-free passing technique, are potentially effective in reducing scalpel blade injuries. It is up to employers and scalpel users to consider and use safer and more effective scalpel safety measures when feasible.

== See also ==
- Laser scalpel – Medical use of laser to cut tissues
