= Association of Cardiothoracic Surgical Assistants =

The Association of Cardiothoracic Surgical Assistants (ACSA) is a professional body in the United Kingdom that ACSA represents a body of non-medical practitioners working in cardiothoracic surgery, performing a range of skilled interventions. It was formed in 1997.

The ACSA supports its members by providing educational meetings, discussion forums and professional advice. Members also can receive indemnity cover at a reduced cost from the Medical Protection Society and receive a newsletter, have access to a members' forum and to archived educational material. ACSA represents its members in the Society of Cardiothoracic Surgery and has helped to develop the National Curriculum framework for surgical care practitioners.

== History of ACSA ==
In 1997, 12 surgical assistants from the UK met to discuss the future of cardiothoracic surgical assistants in the UK; a motion was passed to form the Association of Cardiothoracic Surgical Assistants (ACSA). Richard Ward was elected as its inaugural president, and the association identified the need for a support network and standard education and qualification practices.

The same year, the Society of Cardiothoracic Surgery, the Royal College of Surgeons of Great Britain and Ireland and ACSA formulated the Surgeons' Assistant Diploma in Cardiothoracic Surgery. In 1998, ACSA identified a need to run a revision course for future candidates for the diploma. This course has since run with great success.

In 2004, the title of Surgical Practitioner was reviewed by the United Kingdom Department of Health. The title was later changed once again to "Surgical Care Practitioner (SCP)". This title is still used today although it should be said that it is still only a working title due to disputes with other groups. The same year, work began on the National Curriculum Framework for SCPs, started by the Department of Health.

ACSA worked with many other organisations including the Royal College of Surgeons, the National Association of Assistants in Surgical Practice, the Association for Perioperative Practice, the Association of Surgeons in Training, the Association of Operating Department Practitioners, the British Orthopaedic Trainees Association, and the Royal College of Obstetricians and Gynaecologists.

In 2006 the National Curriculum framework was published. In 2007 ACSA and SCTS decided to start holding their Annual General Meetings to coincide with each other.

Steven Bryant went on to become president of ACSA for two years, during this time Steven attended many meetings at the RCS and other organisations such as the 'new ways of working' department, set up by the last government to discuss the future development of the surgical assistant/care practitioner. He is widely credited as one of the leading lights in the profession and in 2011 became the first non-medically qualified practitioner to become an examiner for the RCS diploma. Steven Bryant continues to work at Papworth hospital in Cambridgeshire as the lead scp Papworth Hospital is regarded as one of the main training centres for SA/SCP training in the UK and abroad.

== ACSA meetings and Presidents past and present ==
Year	Place	President
1997	Inaugural meeting, Peterborough	Richard Ward
1998	Second meeting, Peterborough	Richard Ward
1999	Third meeting, Papworth Hospital	Richard Ward
2000	Fourth meeting, Peterborough	Richard Ward
2001	Fifth meeting, Huntingdon	Richard Ward
2002	Sixth meeting, Huntingdon	Terry Redhead
2003	Seventh meeting, Newcastle-upon-Tyne	Terry Redhead
2004	Eight meeting, Newcastle-upon-Tyne	Steve Bryant
2005	Ninth meeting, Nottingham	Steve Bryant
2006	Tenth meeting, Birmingham, West Midlands	Tony Jessop
2007	Eleventh meeting, Edinburgh	Tony Jessop
2008	Twelfth meeting, Edinburgh (within SCTS)	Tony Jessop
2009	Thrteenth meeting, Bournemouth (within SCTS)	Tobias Rankin
