= Tagetik =

Software company in Italy and the US

Tagetik develops and sells cloud and on-premises corporate performance management software applications for use by corporate finance teams and their business users.

== History ==
Tagetik has headquarters in Lucca, Italy and Stamford, Connecticut. In July 2014, the company announced $36 million in outside funding. In June 2015, the company acquired iNovasion, a Netherlands-based company, and opened its Benelux direct operation. In February 2016, Tagetik established Tagetik GmbH, a direct operation for the German, Austrian, and Swiss markets. In September 2016, the company opened a new office in Brussels. In December 2016, Tagetik established Tagetik Nordic AB, a direct operation for the Swedish, Norwegian, Finnish, Danish, and Icelandic markets, and opened a new office in Stockholm.

On 6 April 2017 Tagetik was acquired by Wolters Kluwer.

== Product ==
The company's software monitors and manages financial performance and processes, such as budgeting, consolidation, planning and forecasting, disclosure management, and reporting. The software uses Microsoft Office, using Microsoft Excel, Word and PowerPoint for input and report templates. The software also has connectors to Microsoft Power BI, SharePoint, SQL Server, Dynamics AX and NAV and runs on Microsoft Azure.

Tagetik runs on Microsoft SQL Server, PostgreSQL, Oracle or SAP HANA databases. The company also has developed a connector to the Qlik Analytics Platform and to SAP to automate extracting and mapping data and metadata from SAP ECC FI, and BW tables.

== Customers and Partners ==
As of June 2015, Tagetik had approximately 750 corporate customers around the world. Representative customers include: Fiat Chrysler, Grupo Aquinos, Henkel, Webster Bank, Randstad, Carillion, and John Hancock-Manulife. Major consulting partners include Satriun, Accenture, Impactera (Pure Player), Alper & Schetter Consulting GmbH, Deloitte, Ernst & Young, KPMG, and PwC and MultiCube. Among Tagetik's technology partners are Amazon Web Services, Microsoft, NetSuite, Qlik, and SAP.

CCH Tagetik has four key consulting partners in the UK: HAYNE Solutions, VantagePoint, Codestone, and AIS Consulting. These partners play a crucial role in delivering comprehensive financial and corporate performance management solutions by offering expert implementation, customisation, and support services. Their collaboration with CCH Tagetik ensures that UK businesses can optimise their financial processes, enhance reporting accuracy, and drive better decision-making through tailored solutions.
