= Datacert =

American computer software company

- Type: Private
- Industry: Computer Software
- Founded: 1998
- Founder: Eric Elfman
- Successor: Wolters Kluwer ELM Solutions
- Headquarters: Houston, Texas, United States
- Area served: Worldwide
- Products: TyMetrix 360° Passport Collaboration Portal, Advanced Invoice Management System (AIMS), Corporate Legal Desktop
- Number of employees: 10,001+ employees
- Website: Official website

Datacert is a computer software company that provides legal enterprise management software and services designed for legal departments. In 2014, Datacert was acquired by Wolters Kluwer and merged with the company's enterprise legal management (ELM) business, TyMetrix, and became ELM Solutions.

== History ==
Datacert was founded in 1998 in Houston, Texas, by Eric Elfman. The company's original product was an online document exchange where law firms would submit bills to corporate legal departments electronically.

The company acquired DigiContract, an online document collaboration service provider, on August 13, 2001. In 2004, Datacert placed No. 194 on the Inc. 500 list.

Datacert Europe Ltd. opened its London headquarters in 2005.

In 2007, additional European offices were opened in Paris and Frankfurt. The company acquired Corprasoft, a matter management company, in May of that year.

Eric Elfman stepped down from his position as CEO in 2008, and James Tallman, former COO, was appointed president and CEO.

In 2010, Datacert opened offices in Toronto and acquired a software development and professional services center from Symcon Global Technologies, resulting in an additional office in Chennai, India. Datacert also launched its patent-pending technology platform, PassportTM.

In 2011, Walmart began using Datacert's Passport technology platform, along with Datacert's matter management and spend management systems, both built into Passport.

In 2014, Datacert's parent company, Third Coast Holdings, Inc., was acquired by Wolters Kluwer. Datacert merged with Wolters Kluwer's subsidiary Tymetrix, their existing ELM business. The combined business became ELM Solutions.

== Offices ==
ELM Solutions is headquartered in Houston, Texas, and operates corporate offices throughout North America, EMEA, and APAC. The company's EMEA headquarters are in London with three more European offices in Basel, Paris, and Frankfurt. ELM Solution's APAC office is located in Chennai, India.
