= Asca aphidioides =

Scientific classification
- Kingdom: Animalia
- Phylum: Arthropoda
- Subphylum: Chelicerata
- Class: Arachnida
- Order: Mesostigmata
- Family: Ascidae
- Genus: Asca
- Species: A. aphidioides

Binomial name
- Asca aphidioides (Linnaeus, 1758)

Species of mite

Asca aphidioides is a species of mite in the family Ascidae. It is found in western Europe, and eastern regions of North America.
