= Croner Group =

British company

Croner
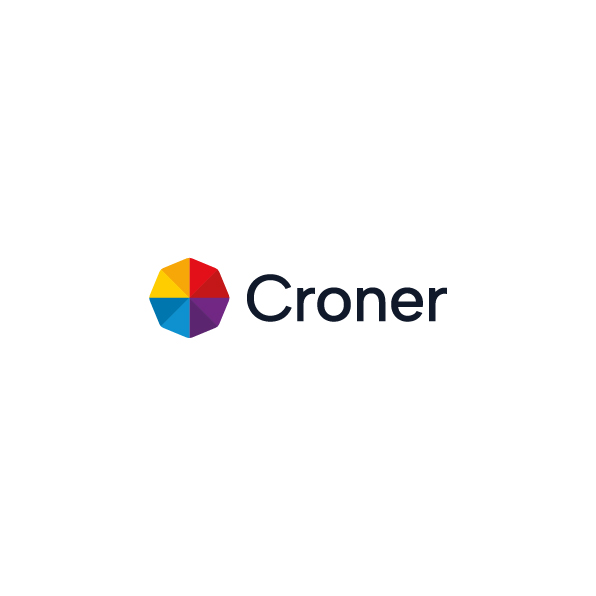
- Founded: 1941
- Founder: Ulrich Horst Edward Croner Transformed by Petre Sefton and Hans Staal
- Headquarters: Hinckley, Leicestershire, United Kingdom
- Services: Employment Law, HR and Health & Safety
- Parent: Peninsula Business Services
- Website: www.croner.co.uk

Croner is a British company that is active in the four areas of human resources, health and safety, procurement, employment and education law.

== History ==
=== Early history ===
Croner Publications Ltd. was established in 1941 by Ulrich Horst Edward Croner. The Company's first publication was a newsletter, Shippers Overseas Correspondence. Later, as a consequence of increasing wartime controls, Mr Croner compiled all the information needed by exporters and importers into the “Reference Book for Shippers.” The next 20 years saw the publication of four more loose-leaves: the Reference Book for Employers (1955), the World Directory of Freight Conferences, The Reference Book for Importers and Road Transport Operation.

The modern history of Croner dates back to 1976 when Mrs. Croner appointed her nephew, Andrew Brode, as the new managing director. Brode set about expanding the marketing effort and raising the profile of the loose-leaf as an information delivery system. The increased profitability attracted the attention of UK and European publishers and in 1977 Brode negotiated the acquisition of Croner by a Dutch group ICU. In 1982, ICU subsequently changed its name to the Wolters Samson Group, and, in 1987, combined with Kluwer to form Wolters Kluwer.

=== 1980s ===
The 1980s saw an increase in Croner's activities into new subject areas such as catering, health and safety, school management and premise management. Led by Petre Sefton, Croner expanded into business law and oversaw the relocation of the company to Kingston.

=== 1990s ===
In 1999 the company acquired IRPC Group Limited, active in employment, health and safety, compliance and taxation matters. Dennis Hunt identified a demand for advisory and compliance services in response to increasing employment legislation and trade union activity in the 1970s.

=== 2000s ===
In 2002 IRPC was rebranded to Croner Consulting alongside several other acquired units.

In 2013 Croner Group Limited was incorporated. As per article of association initial shareholding was exclusively with Wolters Kluwer (UK) Limited. In 2016, Peninsula Business Services acquired Croner from Wolters Kluwer.

Croner's human resources (HR) services support provide software and employment legal and tax assistance. Health and safety advisors provide help with compliance, audits and also offer crisis support in the event of an incident. Croner partner with over 130 associations to allow their members access to additional services, having formed a strategic alliance with the Recruitment and Employment Confederation (REC).

The IRPC brand (now Croner) primarily concentrates on offering fee protection insurance, a scheme that covers the clients of an accountancy practice for any professional fees that result from an investigation by HM Revenue and Customs.
