= Swann-Morton =

British manufacturer of surgical equipments

Swann-Morton Limited

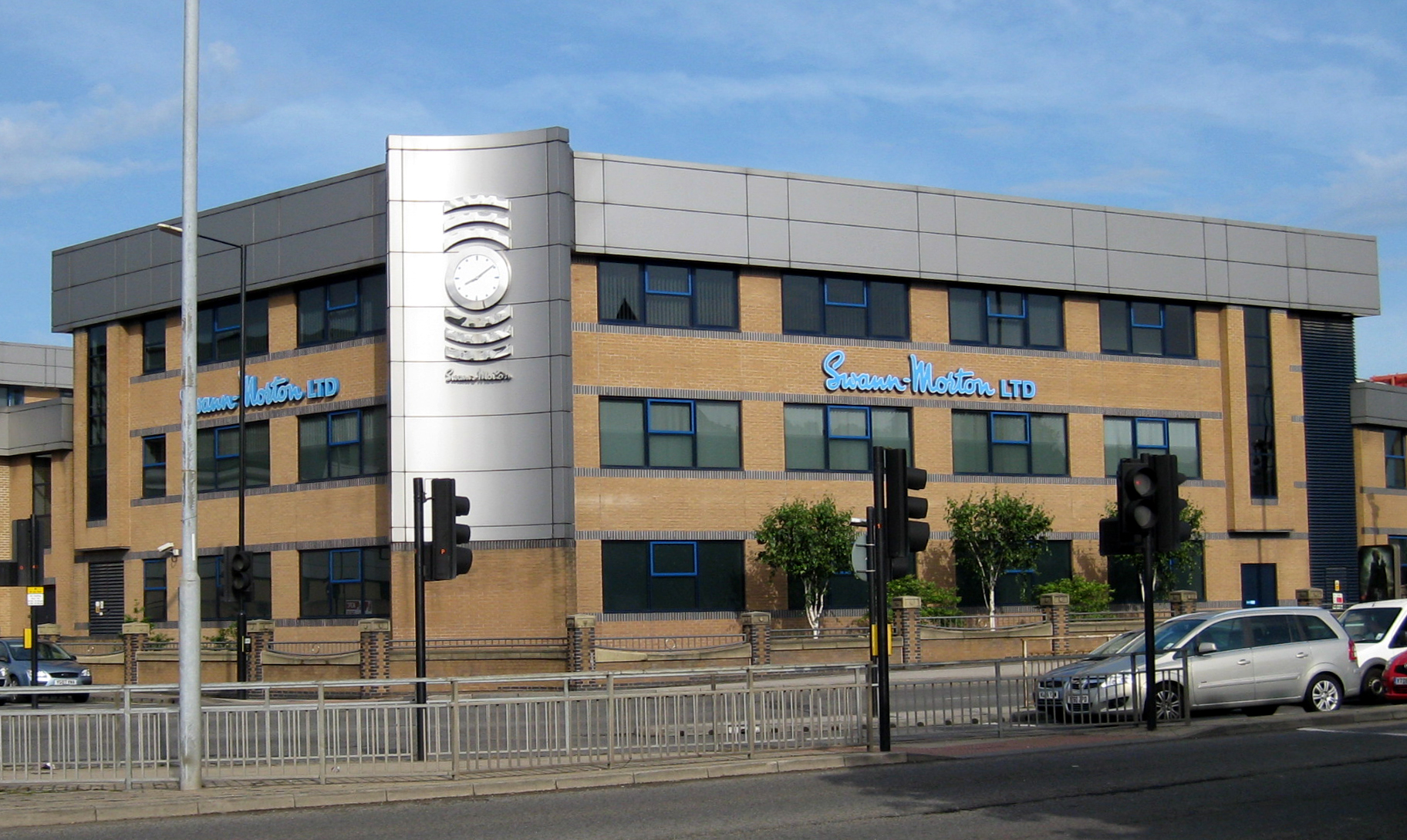
- Company Headquarters, Owlerton Green, Sheffield
- Founded: August 1932
- Headquarters: Sheffield, South Yorkshire, England
- Number of employees: Approximately 400
- Website: www.swann-morton.com

Swann-Morton Limited is a British manufacturer of scalpel handles, blades and other surgical equipment based in Sheffield, England. It was founded in 1932 by Walter R. Swann, J. A. Morton and D. Fairweather to make and sell razor blades.

== Founding principles ==
Before they began trading, the founders drew up a list of four founding principles:

- Claims of individuals producing in an industry [come] first, before anything else, and must always remain first. They are the human beings on which everything is built.
- If the industry cannot pay the rightful reward of labour (while they are producing for profit for the owners) then a new policy is required on the part of the management to make it do so.
- If the management can't do the job, then a new management is required, as well as a new policy.
- Individuals in any industry have a perfect right to demand and see that this objective is reached, because they produce the goods.

These four statements are displayed at Swann-Morton's head office.

== History ==
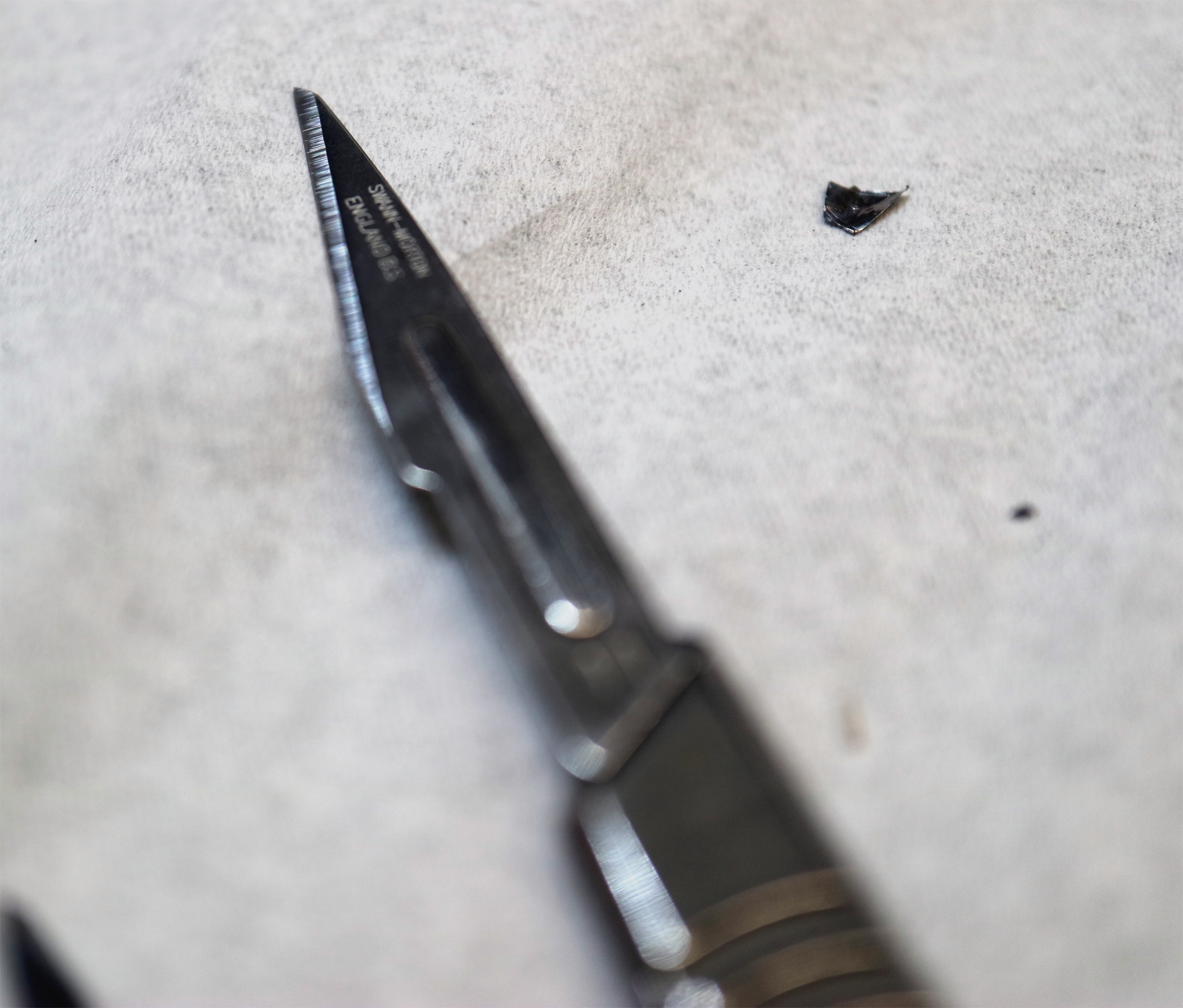
Steel scalpel blade, manufactured by Swann-Morton

When the Bard-Parker patent for a two-piece scalpel ran out in 1935, Swann-Morton expanded its product range in this direction.

The company moved to its current site in the 1940s. Morton left the company around this time. The remaining directors took the decision to put the company in a trust where 50% was shared with the employees and the other 50% in a charitable trust.
