= Anvil City Science Academy =

Charter school in Nome, Alaska, United States

Coordinates: 64.515234°N 165.386368°W

- Nome, Alaska; United States

Information
- School type: Charter school
- Established: 1997; 29 years ago
- Principal: Lisa Leeper
- Grades: 5-8
- Enrollment: 61 (2018)
- Capacity: 66
- Website: www.nomeschools.org/apps/pages/index.jsp?uREC_ID=3697657&type=d&pREC_ID=2425458

The Anvil City Science Academy, also known as ACSA, is a charter school in Nome, Alaska with approximately 60 students from grades 5–8. The school expanded in 2015 to hold 66 students from the previous 44. The academy was founded in 1997 by multiple teachers. It is currently staffed by three teachers and one principal. The current principal is Lisa Leeper. As of 2018, Anvil City Science Academy had 61 students. The school has a different budget every year, known as "Taters".
