= Peter Done =

English billionaire businessman (born 1947)

- Born: 6 February 1947 (age 79); Salford, United Kingdom
- Occupations: Group Founder and CEO, Peninsula Business Services
- Known for: Businessman; Co-founder of Betfred
- Spouse: Anne Done (m.1968 d.2021)
- Children: 2
- Relatives: Fred Done (brother)

Peter Eric Done (born 6 February 1947) is an English billionaire businessman. He is a co-founder of Betfred and the founder and group managing director of Peninsula Business Services, established in 1983.

== Early life ==
Done was born in Salford, Lancashire, England on 6 February 1947. Done has three siblings, including Fred Done. He attended Trafford Road School in Salford and Winton Senior School in Eccles, Greater Manchester. At age 15, he left school along with his brother to work at their father's illegal bookmaking business. At 17, Done managed a betting shop for another company. "You weren't even allowed in betting shops until you were 18, and I was managing one at 17". At age 21, he acquired his own shop in Pendleton, England.

== Career ==
=== Betfred ===
In 1967, Done co-founded his own bookmaking business with his brother using money they received betting on the 1966-67 World Cup. They received a £75,000 loan from NatWest. Originally, their business was named Done Brothers, but eventually, it was changed to its current 'Betfred.' In its early days, Betfred was a family business; Done, his brother, their father, their mother and both of their wives helped run the store throughout the week. Done's role at the time was as a sales and marketing director.

The 1967 United Kingdom foot-and-mouth outbreak caused many bookmaking businesses to close. Betfred managed to stay afloat by pivoting from horse racing — the major sport that involved betting — to afternoon dog racing.

After 12 months of successfully being in business, Done and his brother decided to expand by buying another storefront. They bought their new shop at £250 and made the money back within the week. Peter managed the second shop while his brother Fred stayed at the first one. Their sister would go on to manage their third shop.

As of 2018, Betfred has over 1,650 shops and a turnover of approximately £10 billion.

==== Conflict of interest with Health Assured ====
In January 2020, Done and his brother came under public scrutiny after reports emerged that Health Assured, another company the two owned, was earning millions of pounds through government contracts to provide gambling addiction treatment for public sector workers. The arrangement prompted conflict of interest allegations from NHS chief Claire Murdoch and a number of MPs.

=== Peninsula ===
In 1983 Done and his brother co-founded Professional Personnel and Management Services Limited after having to pay £9,000 to settle an employment tribunal. In 1989, after the business was failing leaving their £450,000 investment at risk, Peter and his brother Fred tossed a coin to decide who would lead the company's turnaround, which Peter won.

The business didn't find success until Done identified its potential and decided to focus his abilities and time on it. He planned to advertise its services on the road for six months, then return to work with his brother at Betfred. "I was supposed to be coming back from Peninsula after six months and we were going to get a manager in, but 35 years later I'm still in the business".

In May 2012, Peninsula Business Services acquired a 65% share of Employsure, an Australian advising firm specialising in industrial relations, which was registered as a company in 2011.

In 2013, Done injected a cash investment of £1.6 million to improve and develop the HROnline app. This app was later rebranded as BrightHR and allows employers to manage different types of human resource activities such as sickness, employment, holidays, and lateness recording.

As of 2021, Done is the founder and current managing director of Peninsula.

It claims to be the UK's largest provider of employment law, human resource, health & safety, and employee assistance program consultancy services. Its subsidiaries include Employsure, Peninsula Canada, Croner Tax, Croneri and Croner Group. The company headquarters is the Peninsula Building in Manchester and it employs over 3,500 people worldwide, working in five countries. The Canadian Peninsula branch houses over 200 employees, 3,000 clients, and operates in nine Canadian provinces (Peninsula Team, 2020). In 2023, the business hit £100 million profit for the first time,

== Charity ==
Done, along with his brother, have charitable trusts set up. Their main donations are to children's hospitals and children's charities. They once donated one day's worth of Betfred profits to the Royal Manchester Children's Hospital during the Cheltenham Festival. During the Snooker World Championship, they donated £200 per century break played to the Jessie May children's charity, with the final donation totalling £40,000.

In March 2021, Peninsula raised £1 million for the Royal Manchester Children's Hospital charity. Due to the COVID-19 pandemic and the increased pressure on the staff, Done decided to increase their pledge to £2 million.

Done and the Peninsula Group reached their £2 million fundraising target at the end of 2022 and vowed to help the hospital further with an additional £1 million pledge in 2023.

In April 2024, a new charity partnership was announced between Peninsula Group and Air Ambulances UK, DEBRA UK and Together for Short Lives. The company pledged to raise £3m over three years for the three charities.

== Awards and accolades ==
In 2015, Done was shortlisted for the Service Industries award by the Great British Entrepreneur awards.

In 2019, Done was awarded the Glassdoor Employees' Choice Award.

== Personal life ==
Done lives in Salford. He married Anne Done in 1968 and together they had two children.

Done owns a home in Ladyhill, Manchester, as well as homes in the Lake District and Nice, France.

In 2023, the Sunday Times Rich List estimated his and his brother's net worth at £1.87 billion. Fred and Peter Done and family paid £136.8 million in tax in 2022; fifth place on The Sunday Times Tax List of the UK's 100 biggest taxpayers.

According to the Sunday Times Rich List in May 2025, his and his family's net worth is £2.915 billion.

In February 2026, Peter Done was named at the top of the Sunday Times Tax list with an estimated £401.1 million.
