= Asca =

Scientific classification
- Domain: Eukaryota
- Kingdom: Animalia
- Phylum: Arthropoda
- Subphylum: Chelicerata
- Class: Arachnida
- Order: Mesostigmata
- Family: Ascidae
- Genus: Asca von Heyden, 1826

Genus of mites

Asca is a genus of mites with worldwide distribution in the family Ascidae.

== Species ==
- Asca acornis Lindquist, 1972
- Asca annandalei Bhattacharyya & Sanyal, 2002
- Asca anwenjui Ma, 2003
- Asca aphidioides (Linnaeus, 1758)
- Asca arboriensis Wood, 1966
- Asca arcuata Karg, 1996
- Asca australica Womersley, 1956
- Asca bicornis (G. Canestrini & Fanzago, 1876)
- Asca brevisetosa Wood, 1965
- Asca brevitonsoris Karg, 1998
- Asca chilensis Karg, 1977
- Asca crassiseta Karg, 1994
- Asca duosetosa Fox, 1946
- Asca evansi Genis, Loots & Ryke, 1969
- Asca flabellifera Tseng, 1981
- Asca foliata Womersley, 1956
- Asca funambulusae Bhattacharyya, Sanyal & Bhattacharya, 1998
- Asca garmani Hurlbutt, 1963
- Asca grostali Walter, Halliday & Lindquist, 1993
- Asca heterospinosa Karg, 1996
- Asca hexaspinosa Karg, 1996
- Asca holosternalis Karg, 1994
- Asca homodivisa Karg, 1996
- Asca idiobasis Gu & Guo, 1997
- Asca inflata Tseng, 1981
- Asca kosugensis Lee, Lee & Ryu, 1997
- Asca lacertosa Tseng, 1981
- Asca longiperitremata Bhattacharyya, Sanyal & Bhattacharya, 1997
- Asca longoporosa Karg, 1998
- Asca longotonsoris Karg, 1998
- Asca macromela Walter, Halliday & Lindquist, 1993
- Asca macrotondentis Karg, 1998
- Asca major Womersley, 1956
- Asca malathina Tseng, 1981
- Asca microcuspidis Karg, 1998
- Asca microplumosa Tseng, 1981
- Asca microsoma Karg, 1996
- Asca mindi Walter, Halliday & Lindquist, 1993
- Asca minuta Bhattacharyya, 1966
- Asca mumatosimilis Karg, 1994
- Asca novaezelandica Wood, 1965
- Asca odowdi Lee, Lee & Ryu, 1997
- Asca oligofimbria Karg, 1996
- Asca ornatissima Genis, Loots & Ryke, 1969
- Asca pinipilosa Karg, 1998
- Asca plantaria Ma-Liming, 1996
- Asca plumosa Wood, 1966
- Asca porosa Wood, 1966
- Asca pristis Karg, 1979
- Asca pseudospicata Bhattacharyya, 1965
- Asca ramosa Tseng, 1981
- Asca sinica Bai & Gu, 1992
- Asca submajor Ma, 2003
- Asca tondentis Karg, 1998
- Asca tricornicula Tseng, 1981
- Asca tridivisa Karg, 1996
- Asca variocuspidis Karg, 1998
