= International Journal of Surgery =

- Discipline: Surgery
- Language: English
- Edited by: Riaz Agha

Publication details
- Former name: The Journal of Surgery
- History: 2003–present
- Publisher: Wolters Kluwer
- Frequency: Monthly
- Open access: Delayed, after 12 months
- Impact factor: 10.1 (2024)

Standard abbreviations
- ISO 4: Int. J. Surg.

Indexing
- ISSN: 1743-9191 (print); 1743-9159 (web)
- OCLC no.: 61747594

Links
- Journal homepage

The International Journal of Surgery, formerly known as The Journal of Surgery, is a monthly open-access peer-reviewed medical journal of surgery established in 2003. The journal has been published by Elsevier since 2005, and is being published by Wolters Kluwer since 2023. The journal is affiliated with the Association of Surgeons in Training, the New York Surgical Society, and the Chinese chapter of the International Hepato-Pancreato-Biliary Association.

Clarivate paused indexing of new content from this journal in Web of Science regarding citation practices and their effect on impact factors.

== Abstracting and indexing ==
The journal is indexed and abstracted in:

- EBSCO databases
- Embase
- MEDLINE/PubMed
- ProQuest databases
- Science Citation Index Expanded
- Scopus

According to the Journal Citation Reports, the journal has a 2024 impact factor of 10.1.

== Harold Ellis Prize ==
Since 2004, the journal has annually awarded the Harold Ellis Prize "in recognition of scientific papers judged to be outstanding". Harold Ellis is emeritus professor of surgery at the University of London and currently a professor in the Department of Anatomy & Human Sciences at King's College London.

== Retraction Watch investigation ==
In 2026, Retraction Watch published an investigation into the International Journal of Surgery which alleged that the journal had mandated during peer review that papers submitted to the journal cited papers published in the International Journal of Surgery by its editor Riaz Agha (a form of citation manipulation to boost the journal's ranking), as well as use a paid research registry that Agha owned. In response, Clarivate’s widely used Web of Science database "paused coverage of new content" from the journal, and Wolters Kluwer removed the citation and registry requirements from the journal.

== Sister journals ==
=== International Journal of Surgery Case Reports ===
The International Journal of Surgery Case Reports publishes open access surgical case reports. The editor-in-chief is David Rosin. The journal annually awards the Thomas Starzl Prize.

=== International Journal of Surgery Open ===
The International Journal of Surgery Open is an open access journal of surgery. The editor-in-chief is D. Rosin.
