= Canadian Association for Adolescent Health =

Canadian non-profit organization

The Canadian Association for Adolescent Health (also known in French as l'Association Canadienne pour la Santé des Adolescents) is a multidisciplinary, non-profit advocacy organization based in Montreal, Quebec, which promotes interest in health issues having to do with adolescents between 10 and 19 years of age. The organization publishes a journal and sponsors conferences for the purpose of setting standards in adolescent healthcare across Canada. Founded in 1993 by Jean-Yves Frappier, a pediatrician at Sainte-Justine University Health Center, the CAAH was incorporated in 1996.
