= American Association of Insurance Services =

- Abbreviation: AAIS
- Formation: 1936; 90 years ago
- Type: Not-for-profit trade association
- Location: Lisle, Illinois, United States
- Region served: United States
- Products: Insurance advisory
- President and CEO: Keith Wolfe
- Website: www.aaisonline.com
- Formerly called: The Mutual Marine Conference, Transportation Insurance Rating Bureau

The American Association of Insurance Services (AAIS) is the only national not-for-profit insurance advisory organization in the United States.

AAIS offers property and casualty insurance products and services, including forms, manuals, and rating guidance. AAIS is a licensed statistical agent in more than 50 jurisdictions, collecting data that helps Members meet regulatory statistical reporting responsibilities. AAIS also serves as an intermediary between carriers and insurance regulators. Since its inception, AAIS has evolved into a modern insurance advisory community governed by its Members.

== Background ==
AAIS was founded in 1936 as the Mutual Marine Conference, focused exclusively on inland marine insurance. In 1947, the Mutual Marine Conference and the Mutual Aircraft Conference merged to become the Transportation Insurance Rating Bureau (TIRB), a predecessor of AAIS. Its company practices focused primarily on tariff and regulatory declarations concerning travel insurance risks. The activities of the Rating Bureau slowly expanded to involve all threats of property.

In 1975, TIRB became the American Association of Insurance Services (AAIS), broadening its scope to include all insurance products.

In 1984, AAIS was incorporated in Delaware as a 501(c)(6) non-profit organization.

In 2018, AAIS gained approval from the California Department of Insurance for CannaBOP, the first-of-its-kind Businessowners Policy designed for cannabis dispensaries, storage facilities, processors, manufacturers, distributors, and other cannabis-related businesses operating in California.

In 2018, AAIS collaborated with IBM to introduce openIDL (open Insurance Data Link), the first open blockchain platform focused on the collection and sharing of statistical data between insurance carriers and regulators.

In 2021, AAIS created a not-for-profit subsidiary under the Linux Foundation for insurance industry collaboration on data standards and reporting.

In 2025, openIDL launched the openIDS Data Specifications Working Group, a collaborative effort aimed at revolutionizing how insurance data is standardized and shared across the sector. AAIS joined as a participant of the Working Group.

In 2026, Keith Wolfe was appointed president and CEO.

== AAIS leadership ==
Since 1987, AAIS has been led by several executives in its more recent history. Paul Baiocchi served as president and CEO from 1987 to 2012. He was succeeded by Edmund J. Kelly, who held the role from 2012 to 2023. Werner E. Kruck then served as president and CEO from 2023 to 2025. M. Ross Fisher served as Interim CEO from 2025 until 2026. Keith Wolfe was appointed president and CEO, effective March 1, 2026.
