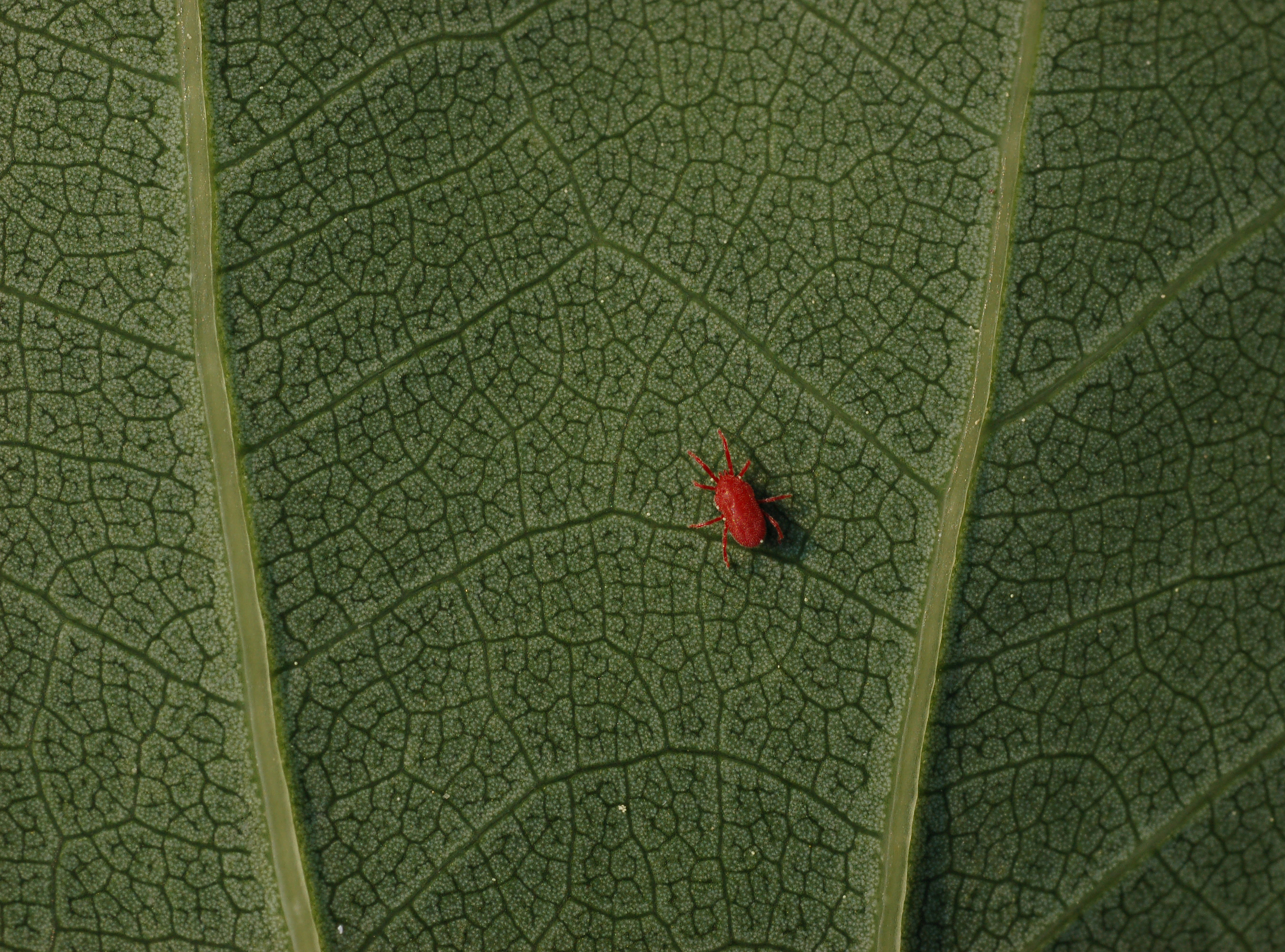

Scientific classification
- Kingdom: Animalia
- Phylum: Arthropoda
- Subphylum: Chelicerata
- Class: Arachnida
- Order: Mesostigmata
- Family: Parasitidae
- Genus: Schizosthetus
- Species: S. lyriformis

Binomial name
- Schizosthetus lyriformis (McGraw & Farrier, 1969)

= Schizosthetus lyriformis =

Species of mite

Schizosthetus lyriformis is a species of mite in the family Parasitidae that feeds on bark beetle larvae and eggs. The species was discovered in 1996 by McGraw and Farrier. Schizosthetus lyriformis is strongly associated with bark beetles, with a geographic range matching that of their most common hosts.
