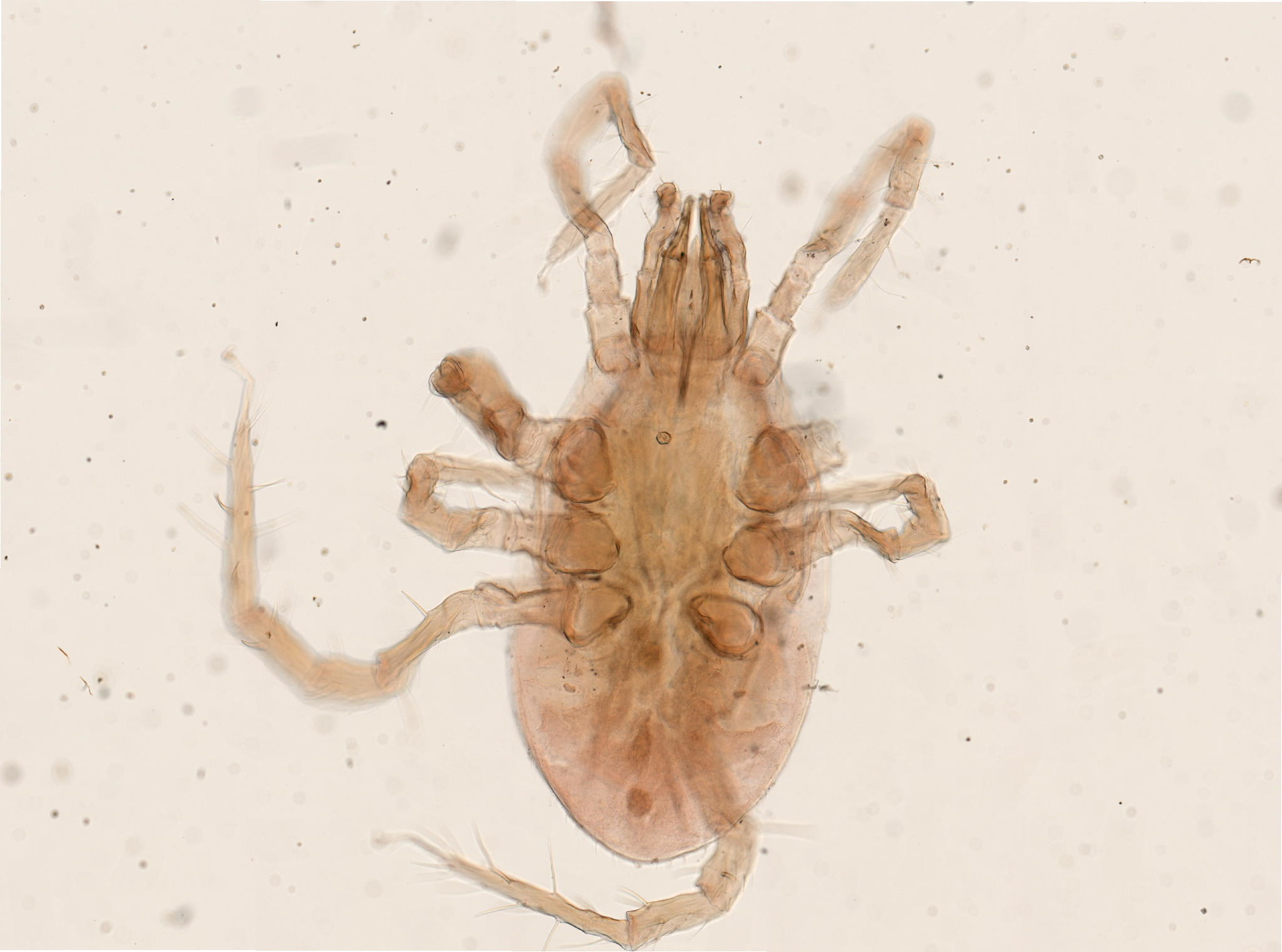
- Parasitus coleoptratorum

Scientific classification
- Kingdom: Animalia
- Phylum: Arthropoda
- Subphylum: Chelicerata
- Class: Arachnida
- Order: Mesostigmata
- Family: Parasitidae
- Genus: Parasitus
- Species: P. coleoptratorum

Binomial name
- Parasitus coleoptratorum Linnaeus, 1758

Synonyms
- Acarus coleoptratorum Linnaeus, 1758; Cornigamasus coleoptratorum (Linnaeus, 1758); Gamasus coleoptratorum

= Parasitus coleoptratorum =

Species of mites

Parasitus coleoptratorum is a species of mite in the family Parasitidae, first described by Carl Linnaeus in 1758 as Acarus coleoptratorum.
