= Lardoglyphus zacheri =

Scientific classification
- Kingdom: Animalia
- Phylum: Arthropoda
- Subphylum: Chelicerata
- Class: Arachnida
- Order: Sarcoptiformes
- Family: Lardoglyphidae
- Genus: Lardoglyphus
- Species: L. zacheri

Binomial name
- Lardoglyphus zacheri Oudemans, 1927

Species of mite

Lardoglyphus zacheri is a species of mite first discovered by Friedrich Zacher in a dermestid beetle culture. The genus Lardoglyphus was erected by Anthonie Cornelis Oudemans in 1927. The species is known to be a pest to institutional and private dermestid beetle colonies.

Lardoglyphus zacheri has been less studied than its congener L. konoi, which is occasionally called the "fish mite" and has been known to threaten supplies of cured fish. As a food supply threat the latter species is therefore more of a concern. However, much can be inferred about L. zacheri by studying L. konoi, the latter of which is known to thrive in humid environments. Thus Lardoglyphus species can be expected to become pests in many tropical and subtropical situations, especially where ambient conditions are humid. Some researchers have asserted that devastating L. zacheri infestations can occur in any climate when their target is a dermestid beetle colony. The high humidity levels produced in the often enclosed colonies are the likely cause of such infestations, even when said colonies are located in relatively dry climates.

Infestations of Lardoglyphus mites, including L. zacheri, are usually associated with infestations of the beetles Dermestes spp. and Necrobia rufipes. These beetles are also pests of dried fish and similar products, and Lardoglyphus deutonymphs (a life stage specialized for dispersal) attach to them to reach new food sources (phoresis).

Dermestes beetles are kept by museums for cleaning vertebrate skeletons, and in the confined conditions of these museum colonies, L. zacheri can reach such high populations that it destroys colonies. This happens when L. zacheri deutonymphs attach to beetles (especially around the mouthparts and legs) in numbers high enough to hinder feeding and movement.
