= Schizosthetus simulatrix =

Scientific classification
- Kingdom: Animalia
- Phylum: Arthropoda
- Subphylum: Chelicerata
- Class: Arachnida
- Order: Mesostigmata
- Family: Parasitidae
- Genus: Schizosthetus
- Species: S. simulatrix

Binomial name
- Schizosthetus simulatrix Athias-Henriot, 1982

Species of predatory mites

Schizosthetus simulatrix is a species of Schizosthetus, a genus of predatory mites in the family Parasitidae. It is found in Europe.
