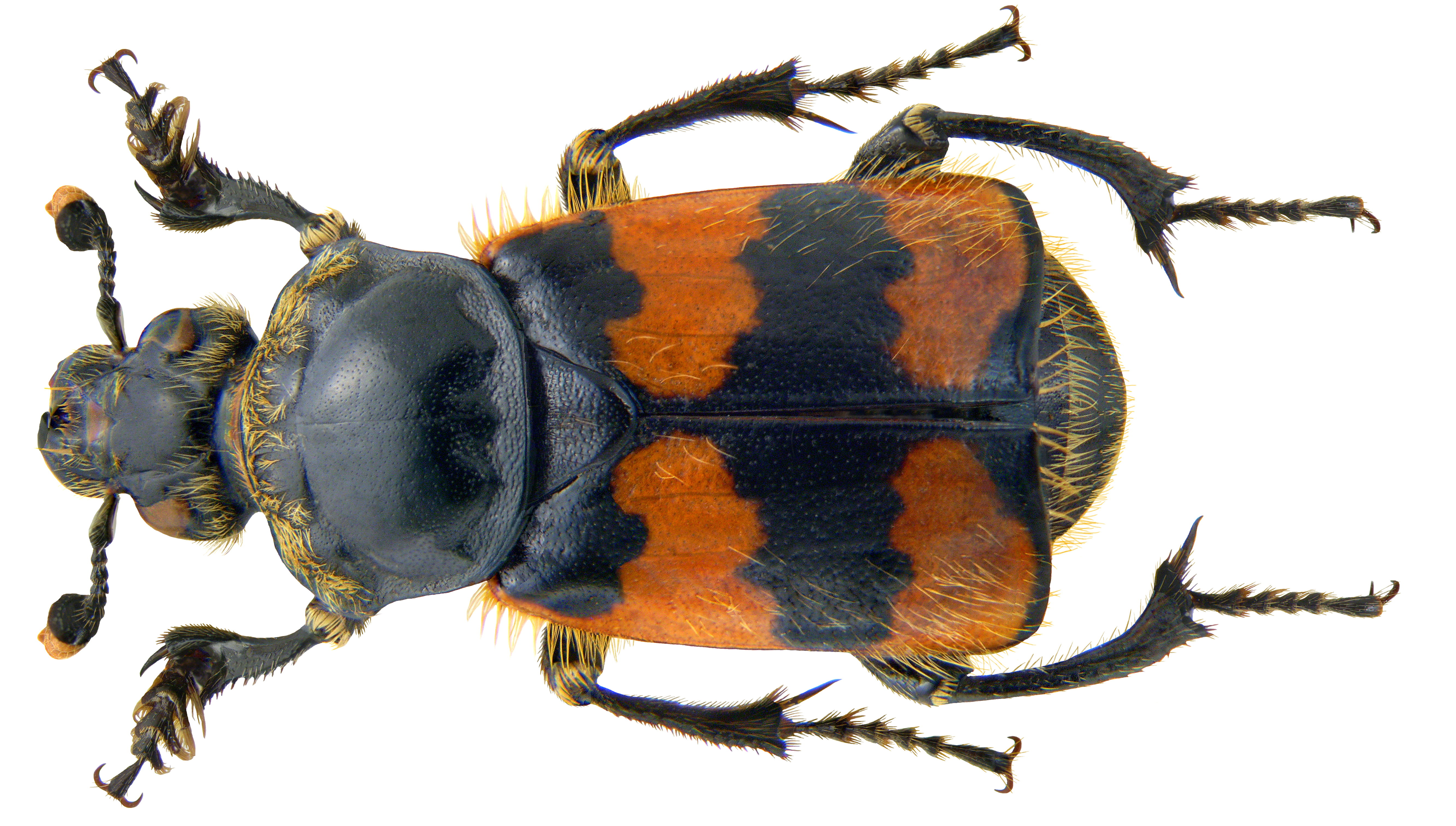

Scientific classification
- Kingdom: Animalia
- Phylum: Arthropoda
- Class: Insecta
- Order: Coleoptera
- Suborder: Polyphaga
- Infraorder: Staphyliniformia
- Family: Staphylinidae
- Genus: Nicrophorus
- Species: N. vespillo

Binomial name
- Nicrophorus vespillo (Linnaeus, 1758)

Synonyms
- List: Silpha Vespillo Linnaeus, 1758; Nicrophorus vulgaris Fabricius, 1775; Necrophorus [sic] bifasciatus Hausmann, 1799 (Unav.); Necrophorus [sic] cadaverinus Gravenhorst, 1807; Necrophagus spinipes Leach, 1815 (Missp.); Necrophorus [sic] curvipes Duftschmidt, 1825; Necrophorus [sic] hadenius Gistel, 1857; Necrophorus [sic] vespillo v. minor Westhoff, 1881; Necrophorus [sic] vespillo v. varendorffi Westhoff, 1881; Necrophorus [sic] vespillo v. Bolsmanni Westhoff, 1881; Necrophorus [sic] vespillo v. fauvelis Fauconnet, 1893; Necrophorus [sic] hauseri Hlisnikovsky, 1932; Necrophorus [sic] vespillo v. bohemicus Roubal, 1939

= Nicrophorus vespillo =

Species of beetle

Nicrophorus vespillo is a burying beetle described by Carl Linnaeus in his landmark 1758 10th edition of Systema Naturae. It has a paleartic distribution and is commonly found across Europe and Asia, extending from Western Europe to Mongolia.

== Description ==
These are large beetles, from 12 to 25 mm in length and fly strongly. The beetles have two striking orange-yellow bands on the wing-cases. They are distinguished from others in the genus by the long golden hairs on the body and wing-cases as well as the orange club-shaped ends of the antennae and the shape of the hind legs.

== Reproduction ==
They live on and lay eggs near carrion. The beetles reproduce from May to September, with both parents participating in preparations and care of the offspring. The parents will excavate beneath suitable small animal corpses, also covering it with the soil, so that it becomes buried and ready for the female to lay eggs. They may move the body to a more suitable location prior to burial. Burial can take place within a day for a small animal like a mouse. After burial they remove hair or feathers and shape the carcass into a ball within a small underground space. Eggs are laid in the soil around the chamber. Once the young beetles hatch as larvae, both parents will feed and protect for them. This care continues for at least 10 days and is up to 30 days earlier in the season when temperatures are cooler and the young develop more slowly. The young will consume the corpse directly and also eat pre-digested food regurgitated by their parents. The final stage in their development is to pupate in the soil and then emerge as adult beetles. Pupae formed towards the end of the breeding season may spend the winter in hibernation and emerge as juvenile beetles the following spring.

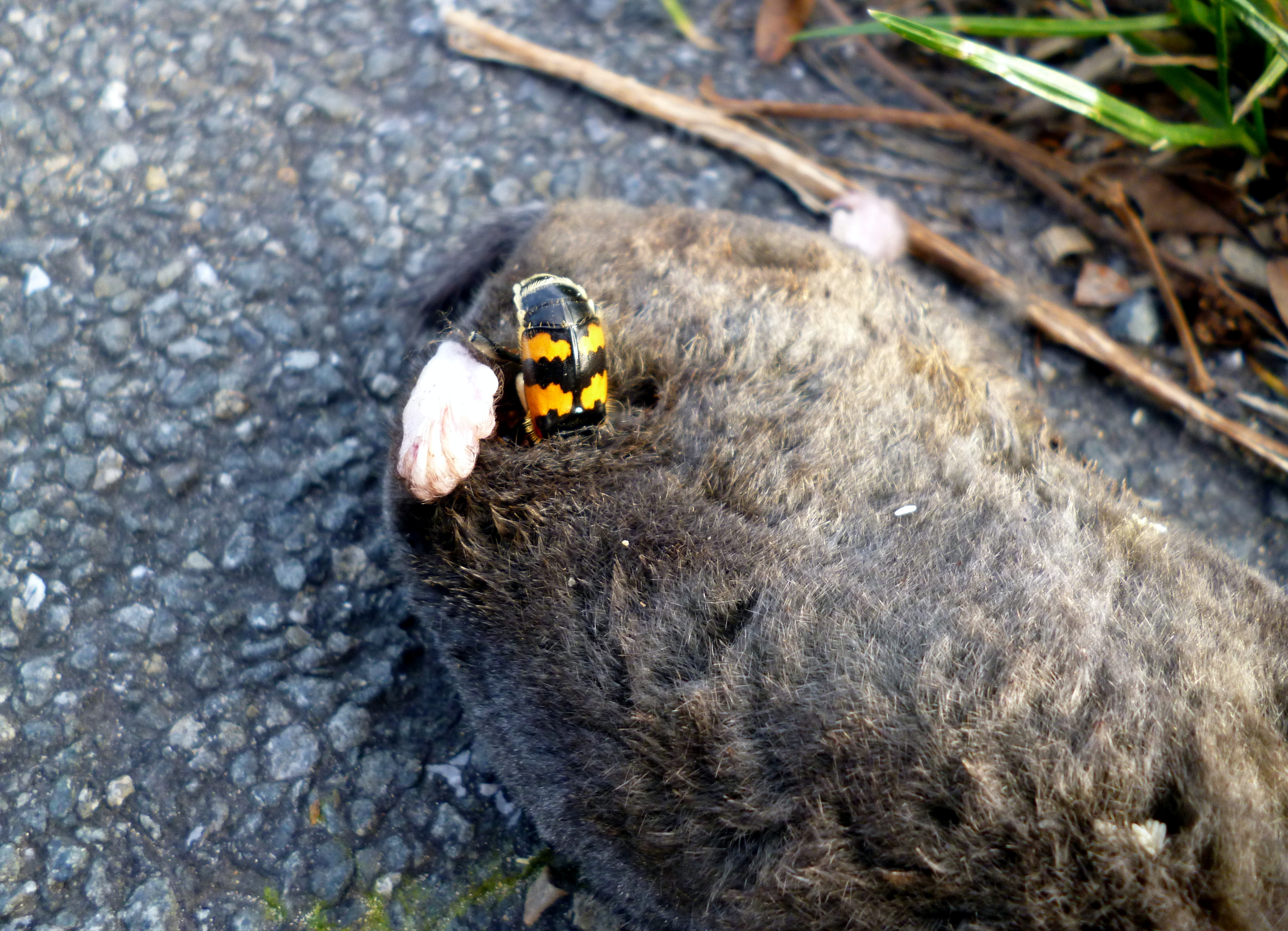
Nicrophorus vespillo on a mole carcass

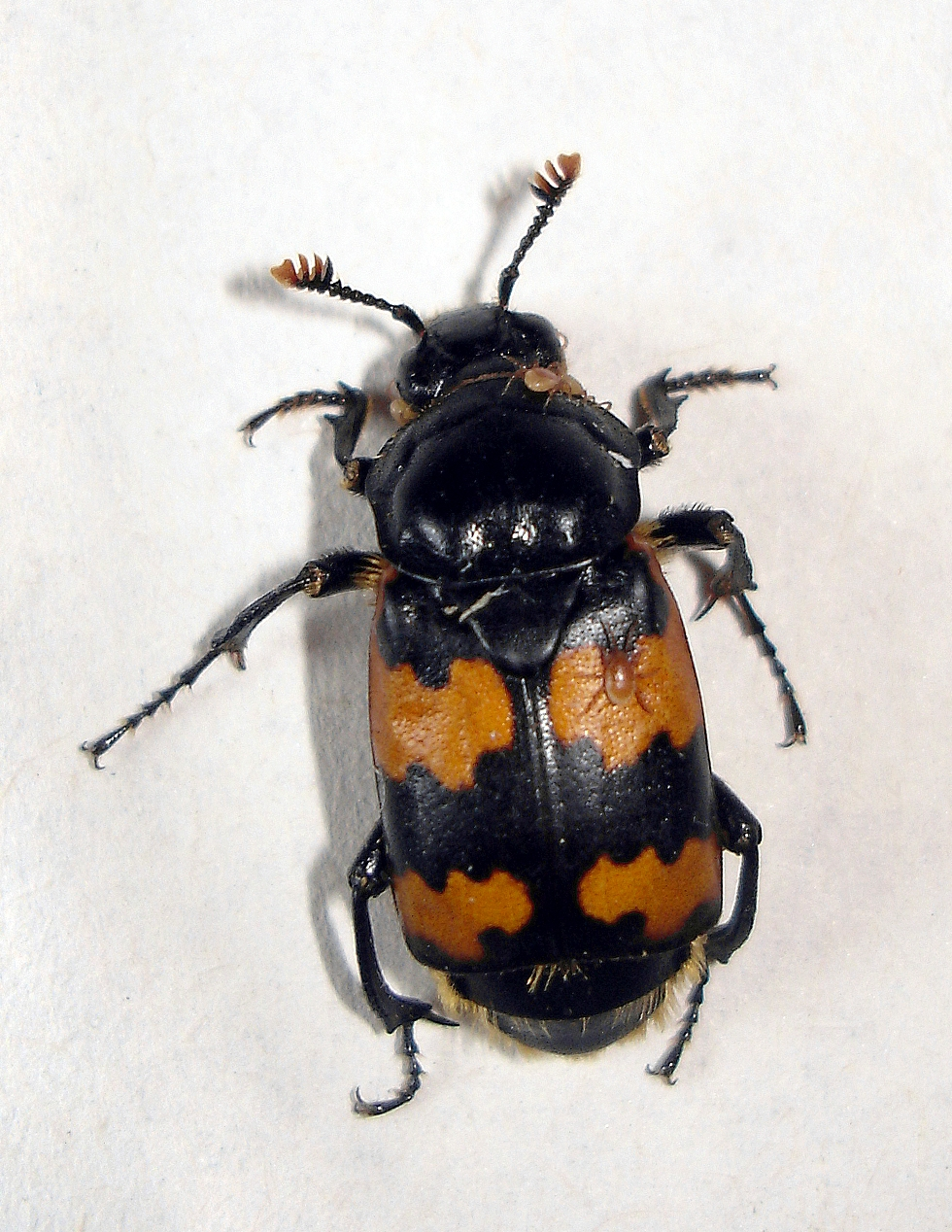
Nicrophorus vespillo transporting phoretic Poecilochirus mites
