= Antennoseius =

Scientific classification
- Kingdom: Animalia
- Phylum: Arthropoda
- Subphylum: Chelicerata
- Class: Arachnida
- Order: Mesostigmata
- Family: Ascidae
- Genus: Antennoseius; Berlese, 1916

Genus of mites

Antennoseius is a genus of mites in the family Ascidae. As of 2021, it comprised 59 species mostly in subgenera Antennoseius (34 species) and Vitzthumia (19 species), as well as six species not assigned to a subgenus.

== Description ==
Females of Antennoseius have two distinct shields on their dorsal surface. On the ventral surface, there is a sternal shield (usually with three pairs of setae), an epigynial shield that is rounded posteriorly, and either an anal shield (with circum-anal setae) or a subtriangular ventrianal shield (bearing 1 or 2 pairs of setae in addition to the circum-anal setae).

The two subgenera can be distinguished by the presence (Vitzthumia) or absence (Antennoseius) of ambulacra and claws on the first leg pair. Additionally, some species of Vitzthumia have two distinct morphs, a free-living morph and a phoretic morph. The free-living morph has much of its soft body cuticle with microtubercles superimposed on striae and on the shields. The phoretic morph has generally smooth cuticle, and its sternal shield may be eroded posteriorly so that st3 (the third seta pair) is on soft cuticle instead of the shield.

Males are known for only a few species. In the male of Antennoseius perseus, the two dorsal shields are partially fused together, ventrally there is a sterno-genital shield (bearing 5 pairs of setae) and a ventrianal shield (bearing 7 pairs of setae in addition to the circum-anal setae), and each chelicera bears a spermatodactyl (structure used to transfer sperm to the female), among other differences.

== Ecology ==
Antennoseius occur in soil (especially soil that is moist), plant litter, salt marshes, moss, and nests of various animals (mice, birds and ants).

Adult females of this genus often attach phoretically to ground beetles for transport.

Diet has been studied for only a few species, but these mainly feed on small invertebrates including other mites, nematodes and insects.

== Species ==
- Antennoseius arvensis Kaluz, 1994
- Antennoseius boskopensis Ryke, 1962
- Antennoseius bregetovae Chelebiev, 1984
- Antennoseius calathi Fain, Noti & Dufrene, 1995
- Antennoseius chirae Jordaan, Loots & Theron, 1987
- Antennoseius dargomensis Barilo, 1987
- Antennoseius davidovae Eidelberg, 1994
- Antennoseius deyi Bhattacharyya, 1994
- Antennoseius fecundus Berlese, 1916
- Antennoseius garurensis Bhattacharyya, 1994
- Antennoseius ghilarovi Balan, 1988
- Antennoseius hyperboreus Nikolskij, 1988
- Antennoseius janus Lindquist & Walter, 1989
- Antennoseius koroljevae Chelebiev, 1984
- Antennoseius kurumanensis Jordaan, Loots & Theron, 1987
- Antennoseius lobochelus Halliday, Walter & Lindquist, 1998
- Antennoseius longipalpus Barilo, 1987
- Antennoseius longisetus Eidelberg, 2000
- Antennoseius makarovae Eidelberg, 1994
- Antennoseius maltzevi Eidelberg, 1994
- Antennoseius matalini Eidelberg, 2001
- Antennoseius matsjuki Eidelberg, 2001
- Antennoseius multisetus Eidelberg, 2000
- Antennoseius orientalis Bhattacharyya, Sanyal & Bhattacharya, 2003
- Antennoseius oudemansi (Thor, 1930)
- Antennoseius ovaliscutalis Eidelberg, 2000
- Antennoseius ranikhetensis Bhattacharyya, 1994
- Antennoseius rugosus Masan, 1997
- Antennoseius shcherbakae Balan, 1988
- Antennoseius similis Eidelberg, 2001
- Antennoseius sinicus Guo & Gu, 1997
- Antennoseius ukrainicus Sklyar, 1994
- Antennoseius vysotskajae Sklyar, 1994

== Identification ==
- Key to Chinese species
- Key to subgenus Vitzthumia
