= Holoparasitus =

Scientific classification
- Kingdom: Animalia
- Phylum: Arthropoda
- Subphylum: Chelicerata
- Class: Arachnida
- Order: Mesostigmata
- Family: Parasitidae
- Genus: Holoparasitus; Oudemans, 1936

Genus of mites

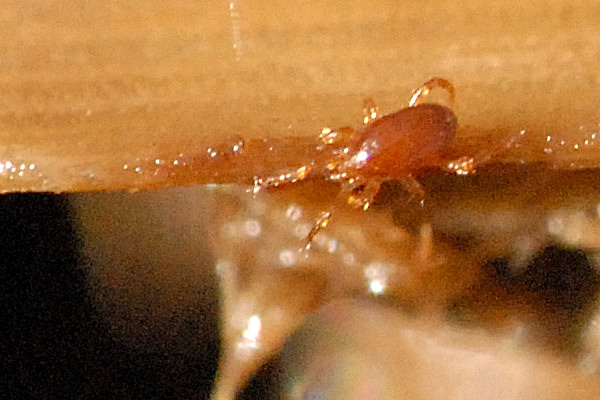
Holoparasitus calcaratus

Holoparasitus is a genus of mites in the family Parasitidae.

== Species ==
- Holoparasitus ampullaris Witalinski, 1994
- Holoparasitus apenninorum (Berlese, 1906)
- Holoparasitus calcaratus (C.L.Koch, 1839)
- Holoparasitus cornutus Juvara-Bals & Witalinski, 2000
- Holoparasitus crassisetosus Juvara-Bals & Witalinski, 2000
- Holoparasitus cultriger (Berlese, 1906)
- Holoparasitus dallaii Witalinski, 1993
- Holoparasitus digitiformis Juvara-Bals & Witalinski, 2000
- Holoparasitus ellipticus Juvara-Bals & Witalinski, 2000
- Holoparasitus excipuliger (Berlese, 1903)
- Holoparasitus gibber Juvara-Bals & Witalinski, 2000
- Holoparasitus globosus Witalinski, 1994
- Holoparasitus inventus Vinnik, 1994
- Holoparasitus kerkirensis Witalinski & Skorupski, 2003
- Holoparasitus lawrencei Hyatt, 1987
- Holoparasitus maritimus Hyatt, 1987
- Holoparasitus megacalcaratus Schmolzer, 1995
- Holoparasitus micherdzinskii Witalinski, 1981
- Holoparasitus paradisiacus Witalinski & Skorupski, 2003
- Holoparasitus peraltus (Berlese, 1903)
- Holoparasitus pollicipatus (Berlese, 1903)
- Holoparasitus pseudoperforatus (Berlese, 1903)
- Holoparasitus siculus (Berlese, 1906)
- Holoparasitus vasilei Juvara-Bals, 1995
