= Rhabdocarpais =

Scientific classification
- Kingdom: Animalia
- Phylum: Arthropoda
- Subphylum: Chelicerata
- Class: Arachnida
- Order: Mesostigmata
- Family: Parasitidae
- Genus: Rhabdocarpais; C. Athias-Henriot, 1981

Genus of mites

Rhabdocarpais is a genus of mites in the family Parasitidae.

== Species ==
- Rhabdocarpais bicuspidatus Athias-Henriot, 1981
- Rhabdocarpais consanguineus (Oudemans & Voigts, 1904)
- Rhabdocarpais cunicularis (Womersley, 1956)
- Rhabdocarpais mammilatus (Berlese, 1904)
- Rhabdocarpais mycophilus (Karg, 1965)
- Rhabdocarpais oxymastax Athias-Henriot, 1981
- Rhabdocarpais parvus Athias-Henriot, 1981
- Rhabdocarpais spinatus Athias-Henriot, 1981
