= Heteroparasitus =

Scientific classification
- Kingdom: Animalia
- Phylum: Arthropoda
- Subphylum: Chelicerata
- Class: Arachnida
- Order: Mesostigmata
- Family: Parasitidae
- Genus: Heteroparasitus; Juvara-Bals, 1976

Genus of mites

Heteroparasitus is a genus of mites in the family Parasitidae.

== Species ==
- Heteroparasitus athiasae Juvara Bals, 2002
- Heteroparasitus coronarius (Karg, 1971)
- Heteroparasitus tirolensis (Sellnick, 1968)
