= Nemnichia =

Scientific classification
- Kingdom: Animalia
- Phylum: Arthropoda
- Subphylum: Chelicerata
- Class: Arachnida
- Order: Mesostigmata
- Family: Parasitidae
- Genus: Nemnichia; Oudemans, 1936

Genus of mites

Nemnichia is a genus of mites in the family Parasitidae.

== Species ==
- Nemnichia elegantulus (C.L.Koch, 1839)
