= Trachygamasus =

Scientific classification
- Kingdom: Animalia
- Phylum: Arthropoda
- Subphylum: Chelicerata
- Class: Arachnida
- Order: Mesostigmata
- Family: Parasitidae
- Genus: Trachygamasus; Berlese, 1906

Genus of mites

Trachygamasus is a genus of mites in the family Parasitidae.

== Species ==
- Trachygamasus ambulacralis (Willmann, 1949)
- Trachygamasus biplumatus Karg, 1998
- Trachygamasus borealis Ma-Liming & Wang-Shenron, 1996
- Trachygamasus gracilis Karg, 1965
- Trachygamasus pusillus (Berlese, 1892)
- Trachygamasus triangulus Karg, 1978
