= Willmanniella =

Scientific classification
- Kingdom: Animalia
- Phylum: Arthropoda
- Subphylum: Chelicerata
- Class: Arachnida
- Order: Mesostigmata
- Family: Parasitidae
- Genus: Willmanniella; Götz, 1969

Genus of mites

Willmanniella is a genus of mites in the family Parasitidae.

== Species ==
- Willmanniella fallax Götz, 1969
