= Antennoseius orientalis =

Scientific classification
- Domain: Eukaryota
- Kingdom: Animalia
- Phylum: Arthropoda
- Subphylum: Chelicerata
- Class: Arachnida
- Order: Mesostigmata
- Family: Ascidae
- Genus: Antennoseius
- Species: A. orientalis

Binomial name
- Antennoseius orientalis Bhattacharyya, Sanyal & Bhattacharyya, 2003

Species of mite

Antennoseius orientalis is a species of mite in the family Ascidae.
