= Carpaidion =

Scientific classification
- Kingdom: Animalia
- Phylum: Arthropoda
- Subphylum: Chelicerata
- Class: Arachnida
- Order: Mesostigmata
- Family: Parasitidae
- Genus: Carpaidion; C. Athias-Henriot, 1979

Genus of mites

Carpaidion is a genus of mites in the family Parasitidae.

== Species ==
- Carpaidion cingulatum Athias-Henriot, 1979
- Carpaidion cinqulatum C. Athias-Henriot, 1979
