= Porrhostaspis =

Scientific classification
- Kingdom: Animalia
- Phylum: Arthropoda
- Subphylum: Chelicerata
- Class: Arachnida
- Order: Mesostigmata
- Family: Parasitidae
- Genus: Porrhostaspis; Mueller, 1859

Genus of mites

Porrhostaspis is a genus of mites in the family Parasitidae.

== Species ==
- Porrhostaspis setosa Gu & Liu, 1996
