= Antennoseius oudemansi =

Scientific classification
- Domain: Eukaryota
- Kingdom: Animalia
- Phylum: Arthropoda
- Subphylum: Chelicerata
- Class: Arachnida
- Order: Mesostigmata
- Family: Ascidae
- Genus: Antennoseius
- Species: A. oudemansi

Binomial name
- Antennoseius oudemansi (Thor, 1930)

Species of mite

Antennoseius oudemansi is a species of mite in the family Ascidae. It is found in Europe.
