= Antennoseius ranikhetensis =

Scientific classification
- Domain: Eukaryota
- Kingdom: Animalia
- Phylum: Arthropoda
- Subphylum: Chelicerata
- Class: Arachnida
- Order: Mesostigmata
- Family: Ascidae
- Genus: Antennoseius
- Species: A. ranikhetensis

Binomial name
- Antennoseius ranikhetensis Bhattacharyya, 1994

Species of mite

Antennoseius ranikhetensis is a species of mite in the family Ascidae.
