= Schizosthetus =

Scientific classification
- Kingdom: Animalia
- Phylum: Arthropoda
- Subphylum: Chelicerata
- Class: Arachnida
- Order: Mesostigmata
- Family: Parasitidae
- Genus: Schizosthetus; C. Athias-Henriot, 1982

Genus of mites

Schizosthetus is a genus of mites in the family Parasitidae.

== Species ==
- Schizosthetus lyriformis (McGraw & Farrier, 1969)
- Schizosthetus simulatrix Athias-Henriot, 1982
- Schizosthetus vicarius Athias-Henriot, 1982
