= Leptogamasus =

Scientific classification
- Domain: Eukaryota
- Kingdom: Animalia
- Phylum: Arthropoda
- Subphylum: Chelicerata
- Class: Arachnida
- Order: Mesostigmata
- Family: Parasitidae
- Genus: Leptogamasus; Trägårdh, 1936

Synonyms
- Breviperigamasus Juvara-Bals, 1981; Holoperigamasus Juvara-Bals, 1981

Genus of mites

Leptogamasus is a genus of arachnids in the family Parasitidae. There are more than 20 described species in Leptogamasus.

== Species ==
These 23 species belong to the genus Leptogamasus:

- Leptogamasus bicornis Witaliński, 2021
- Leptogamasus bihamatus Witaliñski, 2020
- Leptogamasus bucerus Witaliński, 2021
- Leptogamasus chelatus Witaliński, 2022
- Leptogamasus coronarius Witaliński, 2022
- Leptogamasus cortinis Witaliński, 2021
- Leptogamasus digiticornis Witaliński, 2021
- Leptogamasus lamelligynus Witaliñski, 2019
- Leptogamasus montanus Witaliñski, 2020
- Leptogamasus monteamiatus Witaliński, 2021
- Leptogamasus oxygynellus (Berlese, 1903)
- Leptogamasus parasilvestris Witaliński, 2021
- Leptogamasus parcus Witaliñski, 2019
- Leptogamasus ramosus Witaliñski, 2019
- Leptogamasus renogynialis Witaliñski, 2020
- Leptogamasus sarcidanus Witaliñski, 2019
- Leptogamasus sasha Witaliñski, 2019
- Leptogamasus sextus Witaliński, 2021
- Leptogamasus silvestris Witaliński, 2021
- Leptogamasus succineus (Witalinski, 1973)
- Leptogamasus suecicus Trägårdh, 1936
- Leptogamasus trentinis Witaliński, 2021
- Leptogamasus trispinus Witaliński, 2022
