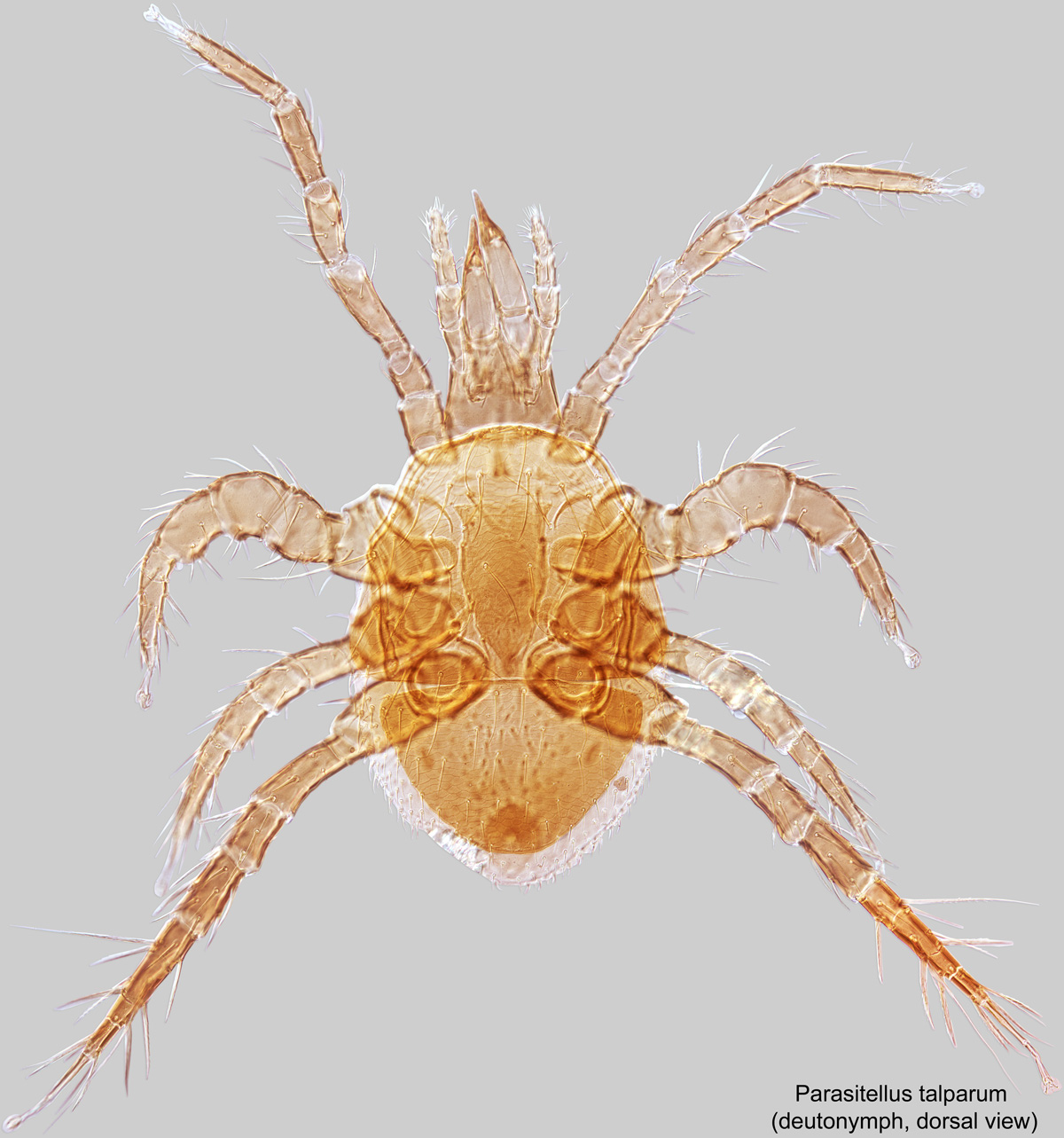
- Parasitellus talparum specimen, dorsal view

Scientific classification
- Kingdom: Animalia
- Phylum: Arthropoda
- Subphylum: Chelicerata
- Class: Arachnida
- Order: Mesostigmata
- Family: Parasitidae
- Genus: Parasitellus; Willmann, 1939

= Parasitellus =

Genus of mites

Parasitellus (formerly Parasitus) is a genus of mites in the family Parasitidae which are obligatory parasites of bumblebees. These mites can be found clinging to the carapace, sometimes in large numbers. Mites in this genus hibernate in the deutonymphal stage. In the tritonymph stage they can actively transfer from bumblebee to bumblebee from flowers, where they can survive up to 24 hours. After they arrive in a bumblebee nest, they will moult into adults. Whilst it is not known what factors trigger the mite to molt, in laboratory conditions P. fucorum were found to moult after eating fresh pollen, although overall moulting success was low. They are kleptoparasitic or neutral to beneficial, depending on life stage; females and deutonymphs feed on provisioned pollen, while other stages are predators of small arthropods.

== Taxonomy and identification ==
=== Species ===
- Parasitellus arcticus (Karg, 1985)
- Parasitellus crinitus (Oudemans, 1903)
- Parasitellus fucorum de Geer, 1778
- Parasitellus hobbsi (Richards, 1976)
- Parasitellus ignotus (Vitzthum, 1930)
- Parasitellus inquilinobombus (Richards, 1976)
- Parasitellus jamalensis Davydova, 1988
- Parasitellus netskyi (Davydova and Bogdanov, 1976)
- Parasitellus papeis Karg, 1985
- Parasitellus perthecatuss (Richards, 1976)
- Parasitellus talparum (Oudemans, 1913)

(Eugamasus (?) ferox (Trägårdh, 1910) = Acarus fucorum De Geer, 1778 in Hyatt, 1980: 327 (synonymy)).

=== Diagnosis ===
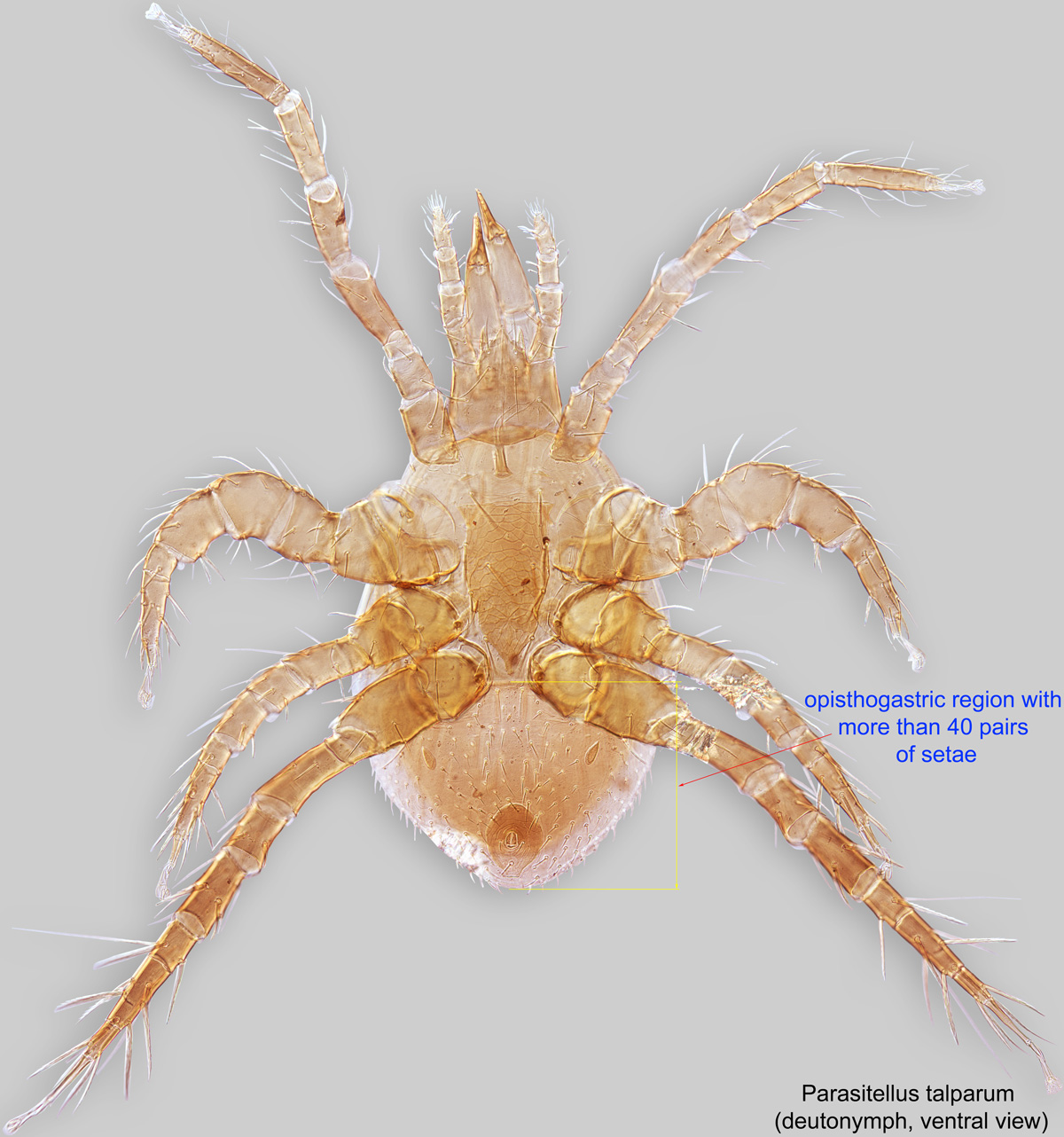
Ventral view with opisthogastric region containing more than 40 pairs of setae shown.

Adult and deutonymph: In both adults and deutonymphs, opisthogastric region has more than 40 pairs of setae (see figure). In all other species of Parasitidae, opisthogastric region has fewer than 30 pairs of setae.

=== Species identification ===
A key to species from North America is available from the bee-associated mites website. A key to species from the British Isles is available in Hyatt, 1980.

=== Similar genera ===
Parasitellus can be distinguished from all other genera of Parasitidae by the opisthogastric region having more than 40 pairs of setae. This region has fewer than 30 pairs of setae in other genera of Parasitidae.

== Distribution ==
Common in the Holarctic region (North America, Europe, Northern Asia, and China). Also reported in the Neotropical region (Argentina and Mexico).

== Hosts ==
=== Bee hosts ===
All species of the genus Parasitellus are obligatory associates of bumble bees (Bombus). Several occasional records are from honey bee (Apis) hives and burrows of small mammals (which are preferential sites for bumble bee nests).

=== Host association level ===
permanent

=== Host associations, feeding, and dispersal ===
- All stages live in nests of bumble bees (Bombus spp.), where females and deutonymphs feed on pollen and other stages feed on small arthropods.
- Mite deutonymphs disperse and overwinter on adult queen bees. Phoresy on workers and males of bumble bees or cuckoo bumble bees is also documented.

== Biology ==
All species of Parasitellus inhabit nests of bumble bees (Bombus). Mite deutonymphs are commonly phoretic on adult bumble bees or cuckoo bumble bees. Phoretic mites prefer queens to other castes (workers and males), since bumble bee colonies are annual and only young queens overwinter. Mites dispersing on workers and males may try to switch to queens later, either during copulation or on flowers, where bumble bees forage.

Species of Parasitellus are not specific to a particular bumble bee species, with different mite species often co-occurring in a single Bombus nest or co-dispersing on a single bee individual.

In Parasitellus fucorum, males, larvae, protonymphs, and possibly deutonymphs, have been found to be predatory or oophagous (egg-feeding) on microarthropods in bumble bee nests and thus, beneficial to the bees, while adult females and deutonymphs preferentially feed on the provisioned pollen.

Mites feed on the upper layer of pollen grains (nectar coating and pollenkitt), without damaging them otherwise. Pollen grains processed in this way lost their normal bright yellow or blue color and became pale and more translucent.
