= Antennoseius koroljevae =

Scientific classification
- Domain: Eukaryota
- Kingdom: Animalia
- Phylum: Arthropoda
- Subphylum: Chelicerata
- Class: Arachnida
- Order: Mesostigmata
- Family: Ascidae
- Genus: Antennoseius
- Species: A. koroljevae

Binomial name
- Antennoseius koroljevae Chelebiev, 1984

Species of mite

Antennoseius koroljevae is a species of mite in the family Ascidae.
