= Aclerogamasus =

Aclerogamasus Temporal range: Palaeogene–present

Scientific classification
- Domain: Eukaryota
- Kingdom: Animalia
- Phylum: Arthropoda
- Subphylum: Chelicerata
- Class: Arachnida
- Order: Mesostigmata
- Family: Parasitidae
- Genus: Aclerogamasus; Athias, 1971

Genus of mites

Aclerogamasus is a genus of mites in the family Parasitidae.

== Species ==
- Aclerogamasus bicalliger (Athias, 1967)
- Aclerogamasus motasi Juvara-Bais, 1977
- Aclerogamasus stenocornis Witalinski, 2000
