= Antennoseius rugosus =

Scientific classification
- Domain: Eukaryota
- Kingdom: Animalia
- Phylum: Arthropoda
- Subphylum: Chelicerata
- Class: Arachnida
- Order: Mesostigmata
- Family: Ascidae
- Genus: Antennoseius
- Species: A. rugosus

Binomial name
- Antennoseius rugosus Masan, 1997

Species of mite

Antennoseius rugosus is a species of mite in the family Ascidae.
