= Anadenosternum =

Scientific classification
- Kingdom: Animalia
- Phylum: Arthropoda
- Subphylum: Chelicerata
- Class: Arachnida
- Order: Mesostigmata
- Family: Parasitidae
- Genus: Anadenosternum; C. Athias-Henriot, 1980

Genus of mites

Anadenosternum is a genus of mites in the family Parasitidae.

== Species ==
- Anadenosternum azaleensis (Daele, 1975)
- Anadenosternum pediculosum Karg & Glockemann, 1995
