= Mixogamasus =

Scientific classification
- Kingdom: Animalia
- Phylum: Arthropoda
- Subphylum: Chelicerata
- Class: Arachnida
- Order: Mesostigmata
- Family: Parasitidae
- Genus: Mixogamasus; Juvara-Bals, 1972

Genus of mites

Mixogamasus is a genus of mites in the family Parasitidae.

== Species ==
- Mixogamasus intermedius Juvara-Bals, 1972
