= Cornigamasus =

Scientific classification
- Kingdom: Animalia
- Phylum: Arthropoda
- Subphylum: Chelicerata
- Class: Arachnida
- Order: Mesostigmata
- Family: Parasitidae
- Genus: Cornigamasus; G. O. Evans & W. M. Till, 1979

Genus of mites

Cornigamasus is a genus of mites in the family Parasitidae.

== Species ==
- Cornigamasus coleoptratorum
- Cornigamasus imitans Athias-Henriot, 1980
- Cornigamasus lunariformis Athias-Henriot, 1980
- Cornigamasus lunarioides Athias-Henriot, 1980
- Cornigamasus lunaris (Berlese, 1882)
- Cornigamasus oulaensis Ma, 1986
- Cornigamasus ocliferius Skorupski & Witalinski, 1997
- Cornigamasus quasilunaris Athias-Henriot, 1980
