= Gamasodes =

Scientific classification
- Kingdom: Animalia
- Phylum: Arthropoda
- Subphylum: Chelicerata
- Class: Arachnida
- Order: Mesostigmata
- Family: Parasitidae
- Genus: Gamasodes; Oudemans, 1939

Genus of mites

Gamasodes is a genus of mites in the family Parasitidae.

== Species ==
- Gamasodes aequipilis Athias-Henriot, 1980
- Gamasodes bispinosus (Halbert, 1915)
- Gamasodes buettikeri Samsinak, 1979
- Gamasodes bulgatus Athias-Henriot, 1980
- Gamasodes coprophilus Chelebiev, 1980
- Gamasodes corniculans Athias-Henriot, 1978
- Gamasodes diceras Athias-Henriot, 1980
- Gamasodes guoluoensis Gu & Liu, 1995
- Gamasodes inermis Athias-Henriot, 1978
- Gamasodes marmotae Ma, 1992
- Gamasodes miliaris Athias-Henriot, 1980
- Gamasodes nudus Tseng, 1995
- Gamasodes plenigranosus Athias-Henriot, 1980
- Gamasodes simplex Athias-Henriot, 1978
- Gamasodes sinicus Tian & Gu, 1991
- Gamasodes spinipes (C.L.Koch, 1841)
- Gamasodes tongdensis Li, Yang & Chen, 1999
- Gamasodes viretianus Athias-Henriot, 1980
