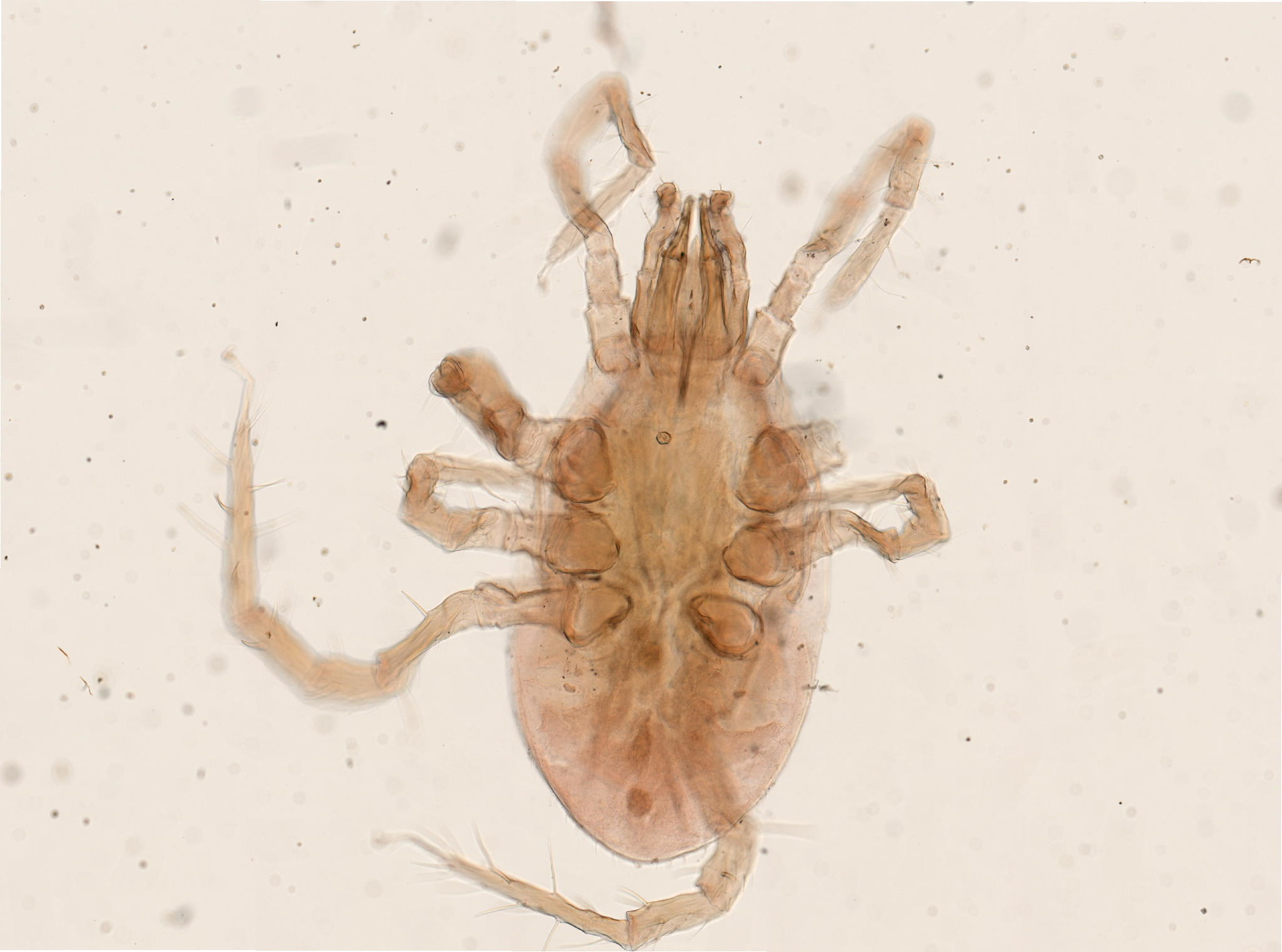
- Parasitus coleoptratorum

Scientific classification
- Kingdom: Animalia
- Phylum: Arthropoda
- Subphylum: Chelicerata
- Class: Arachnida
- Order: Mesostigmata
- Family: Parasitidae
- Genus: Parasitus; Latreille, 1795

= Parasitus =

Genus of mites

Parasitus is a genus of mites in the family Parasitidae, including the following species:

- Parasitus altaicus Davydova, 1978
- Parasitus americanus (Berlese, 1906)
- Parasitus amurensis (Volonikhina, 1993)
- Parasitus anomalus (Ma & Yan, 1998)
- Parasitus apodius (Hennessey & Farrier, 1989)
- Parasitus arcticus Karg, 1985
- Parasitus ascidiformis (Ma, 2003)
- Parasitus asiaticus Davydova, 1984
- Parasitus azaleensis van-Daele, 1975
- Parasitus bacoides Karg, 1998
- Parasitus baoshanensis Gu & Guo, 1997
- Parasitus berlesei (Willmann, 1935)
- Parasitus beta Oudemans & Voigts, 1904
- Parasitus bicornutus (Tseng, 1995)
- Parasitus bidigitalis Karg, 1998
- Parasitus bifiditectus (Hennessey & Farrier, 1989)
- Parasitus bifurcus (Ewing, 1913)
- Parasitus bisiculus (Tseng, 1995)
- Parasitus bispinatus Ma, 1996
- Parasitus brachychaetus Ma, 1986
- Parasitus buccalis Karg, 1978
- Parasitus burchanensis Oudemans, 1903
- Parasitus capitaneus (Athias-Henriot, 1980)
- Parasitus celer C.L.Koch, 1835
- Parasitus cervicornis van-Daele, 1975
- Parasitus chortophilus (Berlese, 1904)
- Parasitus coleoptratorum (Linnaeus, 1758)
- Parasitus comelicensis (Lombardini, 1962)
- Parasitus consanguineus Oudemans & Voigts, 1904
- Parasitus consors (Athias-Henriot, 1980)
- Parasitus convexus Davydova, 1984
- Parasitus copridis Costa, 1963
- Parasitus coprofilus Davydova, 1984
- Parasitus cordiformis (Ye, Ma & Shen, 1996)
- Parasitus crinitosimilis Davydova, 1988
- Parasitus crispus (Ma & Yan, 1998)
- Parasitus davydovae (Volonikhina, 1993)
- Parasitus denenensis van-Daele, 1975
- Parasitus digitalis Schmolzer, 1995
- Parasitus discoidalis (Athias-Henriot, 1980)
- Parasitus distinctus Berlese, 1903
- Parasitus dongbei (Ma, 1990)
- Parasitus effigialis (Athias-Henriot, 1979)
- Parasitus emeishanensis (Ma-Liming & Wang-Shenron, 1996)
- Parasitus eucervicornis (Tseng, 1995)
- Parasitus exiguus (Athias-Henriot, 1979)
- Parasitus femoralis (Athias-Henriot, 1979)
- Parasitus fimetorum (Berlese, 1903)
- Parasitus flagellispinosus (Tseng, 1995)
- Parasitus flavolimbatus (Koch, 1867)
- Parasitus formosanus (Tseng, 1995)
- Parasitus fragilis Ma, 1986
- Parasitus furcatus (Ma-Liming & Wang-Shenron, 1996)
- Parasitus gansuensis (Ma, 1987)
- Parasitus geotrupidis Makarova, 1996
- Parasitus haiyuanensis (Bai, Fang & Yin, 1995)
- Parasitus himalayanus Samsinak & Daniel, 1978
- Parasitus hortivagus (Berlese, 1903)
- Parasitus hubeiensis (Ma & Liu, 2002)
- Parasitus hyalinus (Willman, 1949)
- Parasitus imitofragilis Ma, 1990
- Parasitus inanis Karg, 1978
- Parasitus insularius (Volonikhina, 1993)
- Parasitus islandicus Sellnick, 1940
- Parasitus jamalensis Davydova, 1988
- Parasitus kempersi Oudemans, 1902
- Parasitus kraepelini (Berlese, 1905)
- Parasitus lanceolatus (Tseng, 1995)
- Parasitus latobacoides Karg, 1998
- Parasitus limulus Tseng, 1995
- Parasitus loricatus (Wankel, 1861)
- Parasitus lunariphilus Makarova, 1996
- Parasitus lunulatus (J. Müller, 1859)
- Parasitus maguliaris (Athias-Henriot, 1979)
- Parasitus magus (Kramer, 1876)
- Parasitus majusculus (Athias-Henriot, 1980)
- Parasitus mengyangchunae Ma, 1995
- Parasitus minus (Gu & Huang, 1990)
- Parasitus miratectus Gu & Bai, 1995
- Parasitus monticolus (Berlese, 1906)
- Parasitus multidenticulatus (Tseng, 1995)
- Parasitus multisetus (Gu & Huang, 1993)
- Parasitus mustelarum Oudemans, 1902
- Parasitus mycophilus Karg, 1971
- Parasitus nanus (Athias-Henriot, 1979)
- Parasitus neglectus (Berlese, 1903)
- Parasitus nikolskyi Davydova, 1981
- Parasitus ningxiaensis (Bai, Gu & Chen, 1991)
- Parasitus nolli (Karg, 1965)
- Parasitus obscurus (Athias-Henriot, 1980)
- Parasitus oligochaetus (Gu & Huang, 1993)
- Parasitus oudemansi (Berlese, 1902)
- Parasitus palmatus (Gu & Huang, 1993)
- Parasitus papei Karg, 1985
- Parasitus parvulus (Athias-Henriot, 1979)
- Parasitus pectospinosus Karg, 1998
- Parasitus pinatus (Tseng, 1995)
- Parasitus pinguis Karg, 1998
- Parasitus planicolus (Athias-Henriot, 1980)
- Parasitus plumosus (Gu & Yang, 1987)
- Parasitus pollinerus (El-Banhawy & Nasr, 1986)
- Parasitus prosapialis (Athias-Henriot, 1979)
- Parasitus provincialis (Athias-Henriot, 1980)
- Parasitus pygmaeus (Athias-Henriot, 1979)
- Parasitus qiangorlosana (Ma, 1990)
- Parasitus qinghaiensis (Gu & Yang, 1987)
- Parasitus quadrichaetus Ma & Cui, 1999
- Parasitus radialis (Ye & Ma, 1996)
- Parasitus ramiferus Karg, 2003
- Parasitus remberti (Oudemans, 1912)
- Parasitus reticulatus Berlese, 1903
- Parasitus sakhalinensis (Volonikhina, 1993)
- Parasitus scirpiculatus (Tseng, 1995)
- Parasitus sichuanensis Ma-Liming & Wang-Shenron, 1996
- Parasitus similis (Athias-Henriot, 1980)
- Parasitus simplex (Athias-Henriot, 1980)
- Parasitus sinicus (Ma, 1987)
- Parasitus solens (Athias-Henriot, 1980)
- Parasitus speculiger Athias-Henriot, 1979
- Parasitus squarrosus (Ma, 1987)
- Parasitus stenoventralis (Ma-Liming, 1997)
- Parasitus stepposus Davydova, 1984
- Parasitus subterraneus Schmolzer, 1995
- Parasitus subtropicus (Tseng, 1995)
- Parasitus tarsalis (Athias-Henriot, 1979)
- Parasitus tengkuofani Ma, 1995
- Parasitus tenoriglans (Athias-Henriot, 1980)
- Parasitus tenuipilosus (Karg, 1998)
- Parasitus tonpuensis (Tseng, 1995)
- Parasitus tridentatus (Karg & Glockemann, 1995)
- Parasitus trifidus (Ma, 1987)
- Parasitus trifurcatus (Tseng, 1995)
- Parasitus triramosus (Leitner)
- Parasitus trispinosus (Tseng, 1995)
- Parasitus trivialis (Athias-Henriot, 1979)
- Parasitus truncatus Tseng, 1995
- Parasitus turbinatus (Ma & Yin, 1999)
- Parasitus unicornutus (Ewing, 1909)
- Parasitus wangdunqingi Ma, 1995
- Parasitus wentinghuani Ma, 1996
- Parasitus womersleyi Nozza, 1964
- Parasitus xinjiangensis (Ye, Ma & Shen, 1996)
- Parasitus xiphoideus (Gu & Guo, 1997)
- Parasitus yinchuanensis (Bai, Fang-Lei & Gu, 1994)
- Parasitus zachvatkini Davydova, 1978
- Parasitus zhenningensis (Gu & Wang, 1987)
- Parasitus zschokkei (Schweizer, 1922)
