= Ologamasiphis =

Scientific classification
- Kingdom: Animalia
- Phylum: Arthropoda
- Subphylum: Chelicerata
- Class: Arachnida
- Order: Mesostigmata
- Family: Parasitidae
- Genus: Ologamasiphis; Holzmann, 1969

Genus of mites

Ologamasiphis is a genus of mites in the family Parasitidae.

== Species ==
- Ologamasiphis disfistulatus (Athias Henriot, 1967)
- Ologamasiphis minimus Holzmann, 1969
