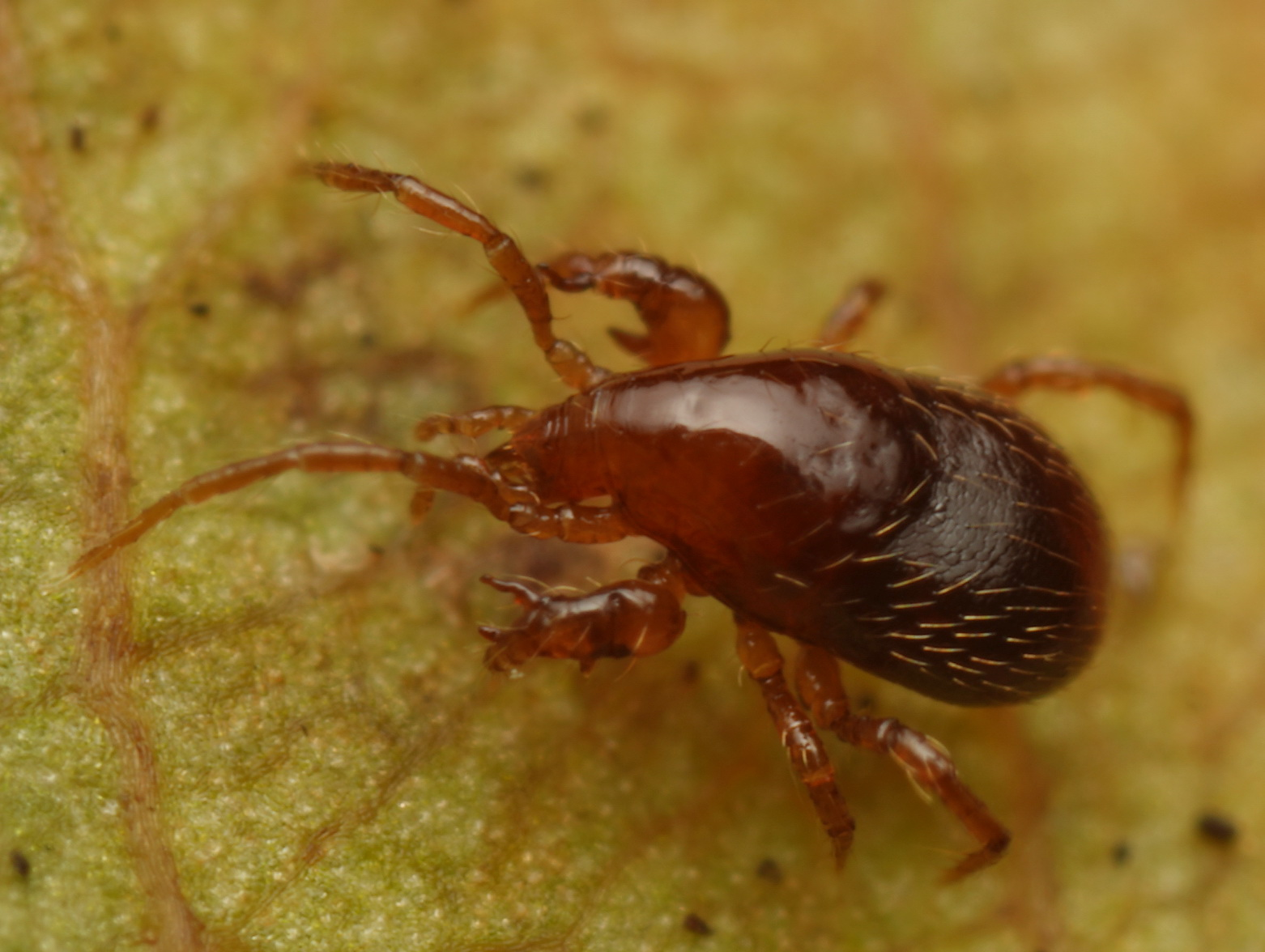
- Pergamasus diversus
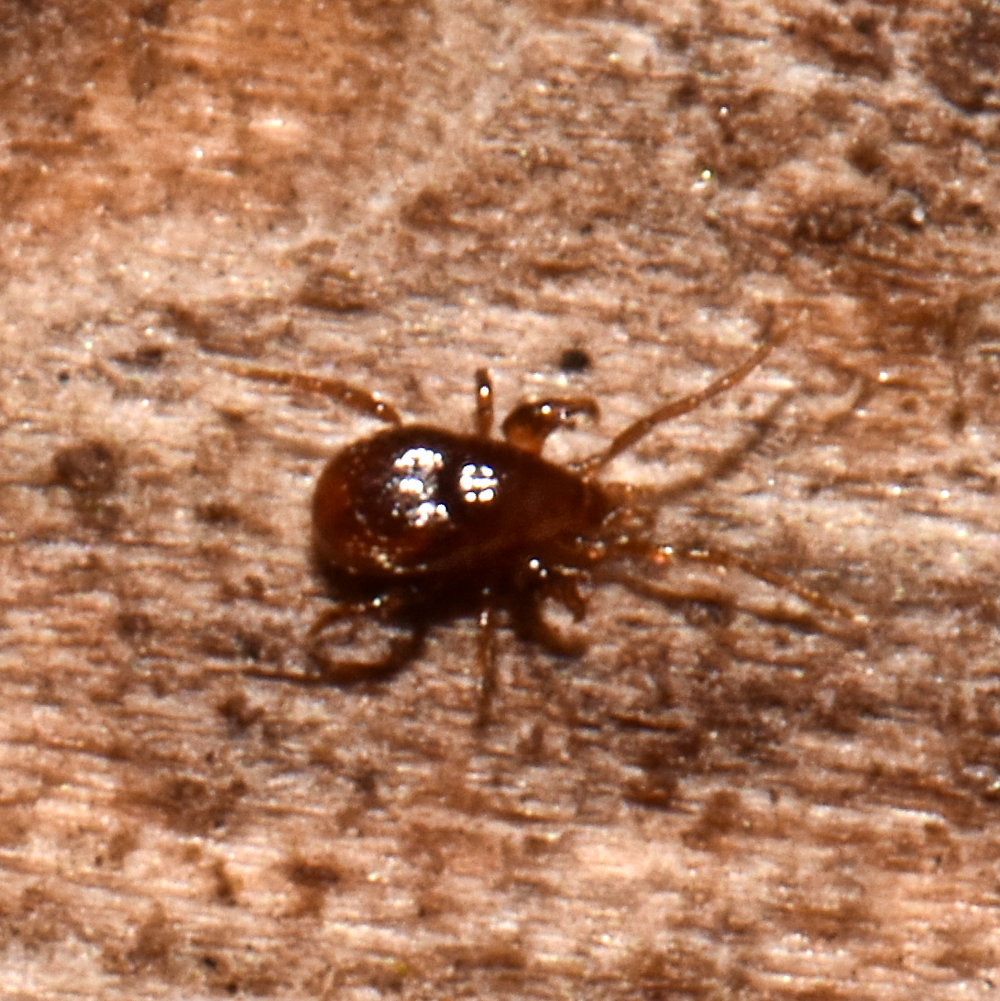
- Unknown Pergamasus species located in Ontario, Canada

Scientific classification
- Kingdom: Animalia
- Phylum: Arthropoda
- Subphylum: Chelicerata
- Class: Arachnida
- Order: Mesostigmata
- Family: Parasitidae
- Genus: Pergamasus; Berlese, 1903

Type species
- Pergamasus crassipes (Linn.) Berlese, 1906

Species
- 50+ (see text)

= Pergamasus =

Genus of mites

Pergamasus is a genus of mesostigmid mites that belongs to the family Parasitidae. They can be found in Europe, North America, Australia and New Zealand.

It is a common predator found in soils.

== Distribution ==
Members of this genus can be found in Europe including the United Kingdom, Iceland, France, Germany, Austria, Slovakia, Portugal, Norway, Sweden, Finland, Estonia, Latvia and Russia. Outside of Europe, they can be found in Canada, the United States, Australia and New Zealand.

== Taxonomy ==
=== Species ===
This genus currently contains more than 50 described species. They are listed below:

- Pergamasus alpestris (Berlese, 1903)
- Pergamasus alpinus (Berlese, 1903)
- Pergamasus atushiensis (Ma & Ye, 1999)
- Pergamasus barbarus (Berlese, 1905)
- Pergamasus belunensis Lombardini, 1962
- Pergamasus brevipes (Berlese, 1906)
- Pergamasus canestrinii (Berlese, 1884)
- Pergamasus clavornatus Athias-Henriot, 1967
- Pergamasus conspicillatus (Athias-Henriot, 1979)
- Pergamasus crassipes (Linnaeus, 1758) (type species)
- Pergamasus diversus (Halbert, 1915)
- Pergamasus decipiens (Berlese, 1903)
- Pergamasus dentipes (C.L. Koch, 1839)
- Pergamasus digitulus (Karg, 1963)
- Pergamasus falculiger (Berlese, 1906)
- Pergamasus feistritzensis Schmolzer, 1995
- Pergamasus franzi Willmann, 1951
- Pergamasus giganteus Willmann, 1932
- Pergamasus hamatus (C.L. Koch, 1839)
- Pergamasus italicus Oudemans, 1905
- Pergamasus jurani (Schmolzer, 1996)
- Pergamasus koschutae (Schmolzer, 1995)
- Pergamasus kotschnae Schmolzer, 1995
- Pergamasus loculatus Tseng, 1995
- Pergamasus longicornis (Berlese, 1906)
- Pergamasus millisetosus Tseng, 1995
- Pergamasus minor (Berlese, 1892)
- Pergamasus mirifactus (Athias-Henriot, 1967)
- Pergamasus misellus (Berlese, 1903)
- Pergamasus norvegicus (Berlese, 1906)
- Pergamasus noster (Berlese, 1903)
- Pergamasus oxygynellus (Berlese, 1903)
- Pergamasus paenisellus (Karg, 1998)
- Pergamasus palatricus Athias-Henriot
- Pergamasus pampinatus Tseng, 1995
- Pergamasus patruelis (Athias-Henriot, 1979)
- Pergamasus physomastax (Athias Henriot, 1980)
- Pergamasus policentrus (Berlese, 1910)
- Pergamasus potschulensis Schnolzer, 1991
- Pergamasus prosapiaster (Athias-Henriot, 1979)
- Pergamasus pseudoalpestris (Schmolzer, 1995)
- Pergamasus quisquiliarum (Canestrini & Canestrini, 1882)
- Pergamasus rhopalogynus (Berlese, 1910)
- Pergamasus runcatellus (Berlese, 1903)
- Pergamasus runciger (Berlese, 1903)
- Pergamasus sagitta (Berlese, 1903)
- Pergamasus sanctusspirituensis Schmolzer, 1995
- Pergamasus shennongjiaensis (Ma & Liu, 1998)
- Pergamasus telluricus (Hennessey & Farrier, 1989)
- Pergamasus theseus (Berlese, 1903)
- Pergamasus tiberinus (G. Canestrini & R. Canestrini, 1882)
- Pergamasus tibiaspinalis Schmolzer, 1995
- Pergamasus tortulatus (Athias-Henriot, 1979)
- Pergamasus varpulus (Athias-Henriot, 1967)
