= Erithosoma =

Scientific classification
- Domain: Eukaryota
- Kingdom: Animalia
- Phylum: Arthropoda
- Subphylum: Chelicerata
- Class: Arachnida
- Order: Mesostigmata
- Family: Parasitidae
- Genus: Erithosoma; Athias-Henriot, 1979

Genus of mites

Erithosoma is a genus of mites in the family Parasitidae. It has a single species, Erithosoma pilosum. This genus was described in 1979 for a single known male specimen, found in Nepal.
