= Cycetogamasus =

Scientific classification
- Kingdom: Animalia
- Phylum: Arthropoda
- Subphylum: Chelicerata
- Class: Arachnida
- Order: Mesostigmata
- Family: Parasitidae
- Genus: Cycetogamasus; C. Athias-Henriot, 1980

Genus of mites

Cycetogamasus is a genus of mites in the family Parasitidae.

== Species ==
- Cycetogamasus californicus (Banks, 1904)
- Cycetogamasus corculatus Athias-Henriot, 1980
- Cycetogamasus coreanus Athias-Henriot, 1980
- Cycetogamasus denticulatus (Tikhomirov, 1971)
- Cycetogamasus diviortus (Athias-Henriot, 1967)
- Cycetogamasus insolitus Athias-Henriot, 1980
- Cycetogamasus planeticus Hennessey & Farrier, 1989
- Cycetogamasus squamatus Athias-Henriot, 1980
