= Zelogamasus =

Scientific classification
- Kingdom: Animalia
- Phylum: Arthropoda
- Subphylum: Chelicerata
- Class: Arachnida
- Order: Mesostigmata
- Family: Parasitidae
- Genus: Zelogamasus; M. K. Hennessey & M. H. Farrier, 1989

Genus of mites

Zelogamasus is a genus of mites in the family Parasitidae.

== Species ==
- Zelogamasus oligochaetus M. K. Hennessey & M. H. Farrier, 1989
