= Paracarpais =

Scientific classification
- Domain: Eukaryota
- Kingdom: Animalia
- Phylum: Arthropoda
- Subphylum: Chelicerata
- Class: Arachnida
- Order: Mesostigmata
- Family: Parasitidae
- Genus: Paracarpais; Athias-Henriot, 1978

Synonyms
- Aceocarpais Aceocarpais Athias-Henriot, 1978; Etiocarpais Athias-Henriot, 1978; Gigacarpais Athias-Henriot, 1978

Genus of mites

Paracarpais is a genus of mites in the family Parasitidae.

== Species ==
- Paracarpais exilis (Banks, 1900)
- Paracarpais furcatus (Canestrini, 1882)
- Paracarpais infernalis (Willmann, 1940)
- Paracarpais kraepelini (Berlese, 1904)
- Paracarpais lunulata (Muller, 1869)
- Paracarpais multidentatus Schmolzer, 1995
- Paracarpais niveus (Wankel, 1861)
