= Phityogamasus =

Scientific classification
- Kingdom: Animalia
- Phylum: Arthropoda
- Subphylum: Chelicerata
- Class: Arachnida
- Order: Mesostigmata
- Family: Parasitidae
- Genus: Phityogamasus; Juvara-Bals & Athias-Henriot, 1972

Genus of mites

Phityogamasus is a genus of mites in the family Parasitidae.

== Species ==
- Phityogamasus primitivus (Oudemans, 1904)
