= Phorytocarpais =

Scientific classification
- Kingdom: Animalia
- Phylum: Arthropoda
- Subphylum: Chelicerata
- Class: Arachnida
- Order: Mesostigmata
- Family: Parasitidae
- Genus: Phorytocarpais; C. Athias-Henriot, 1979

Genus of mites

Phorytocarpais is a genus of mites in the family Parasitidae.

== Species ==
- Phorytocarpais americanus (Berlese, 1906)
- Phorytocarpais beta (Oudemans & Voigts, 1904)
- Phorytocarpais casulatus Athias-Henriot, 1980
- Phorytocarpais caucatus Athias-Henriot, 1980
- Phorytocarpais cynaratus Athias-Henriot, 1979
- Phorytocarpais fimetorum (Berlese, 1903)
- Phorytocarpais frater Athias-Henriot, 1980
- Phorytocarpais grandis Athias-Henriot, 1980
- Phorytocarpais nonus Athias-Henriot, 1980
- Phorytocarpais scapulatus Athias-Henriot, 1980
- Phorytocarpais singulus Athias-Henriot, 1979
