= Taiwanoparasitus =

Scientific classification
- Kingdom: Animalia
- Phylum: Arthropoda
- Subphylum: Chelicerata
- Class: Arachnida
- Order: Mesostigmata
- Family: Parasitidae
- Genus: Taiwanoparasitus; Tseng, 1995

Genus of mites

Taiwanoparasitus is a genus of mites in the family Parasitidae.

== Species ==
- Taiwanoparasitus pentasetosus Tseng, 1995
