= Antennoseius longipalpus =

Scientific classification
- Domain: Eukaryota
- Kingdom: Animalia
- Phylum: Arthropoda
- Subphylum: Chelicerata
- Class: Arachnida
- Order: Mesostigmata
- Family: Ascidae
- Genus: Antennoseius
- Species: A. longipalpus

Binomial name
- Antennoseius longipalpus Barilo, 1987

Species of mite

Antennoseius longipalpus is a species of mite in the family Ascidae.
