= Antennoseius boskopensis =

Scientific classification
- Domain: Eukaryota
- Kingdom: Animalia
- Phylum: Arthropoda
- Subphylum: Chelicerata
- Class: Arachnida
- Order: Mesostigmata
- Family: Ascidae
- Genus: Antennoseius
- Species: A. boskopensis

Binomial name
- Antennoseius boskopensis Ryke, 1962

Species of mite

Antennoseius boskopensis is a species of mite in the family Ascidae.
