= Colpothylax =

Scientific classification
- Domain: Eukaryota
- Kingdom: Animalia
- Phylum: Arthropoda
- Subphylum: Chelicerata
- Class: Arachnida
- Order: Mesostigmata
- Family: Parasitidae
- Genus: Colpothylax; Athias Henriot, 1980
- Species: C. exilis

Binomial name
- Colpothylax exilis (Berlese, 1883)

Genus of mites

Colpothylax is a genus of mites in the family Parasitidae. The genus has only one species, Colpothylax exilis.
