= Dicrogamasus =

Scientific classification
- Kingdom: Animalia
- Phylum: Arthropoda
- Subphylum: Chelicerata
- Class: Arachnida
- Order: Mesostigmata
- Family: Parasitidae
- Genus: Dicrogamasus; C. Athias-Henriot, 1980

Genus of mites

Dicrogamasus is a genus of mites in the family Parasitidae.

== Species ==
- Dicrogamasus imus (Tikhomirov, 1971)
- Dicrogamasus propinquus (Tikhomirov, 1971)
- Dicrogamasus theodori (Costa, 1961)
