= Oocarpais =

Scientific classification
- Domain: Eukaryota
- Kingdom: Animalia
- Phylum: Arthropoda
- Subphylum: Chelicerata
- Class: Arachnida
- Order: Mesostigmata
- Family: Parasitidae
- Subfamily: Parasitinae
- Genus: Oocarpais; Berlese, 1917

Genus of mites

Oocarpais is a genus of mites in the family Parasitidae.

This genus was proposed for a single female specimen from India, species Oocarpais donisthorpei, and no other records of the genus are known. The status of this genus is uncertain.
