= Pergamasellus =

Scientific classification
- Kingdom: Animalia
- Phylum: Arthropoda
- Subphylum: Chelicerata
- Class: Arachnida
- Order: Mesostigmata
- Family: Parasitidae
- Genus: Pergamasellus; Evans, 1957

Genus of mites

Pergamasellus is a genus of mites in the family Parasitidae.

== Species ==
- Pergamasellus delicatus Evans, 1957
