= Lardoglyphus =

Scientific classification
- Kingdom: Animalia
- Phylum: Arthropoda
- Subphylum: Chelicerata
- Class: Arachnida
- Order: Sarcoptiformes
- Family: Lardoglyphidae; Oudemans, 1927
- Genus: Lardoglyphus; Oudemans, 1927

Genus of mites

Lardoglyphus is a genus of mites in the monotypic family Lardoglyphidae, containing the following species:

- Lardoglyphus angelinae Olsen, 1982
- Lardoglyphus falconidus Philips & Norton, 1979
- Lardoglyphus konoi (Sasa & Asanuma, 1951)
- Lardoglyphus radovskyi Baker, 1990
- Lardoglyphus robustisetosus Baker, 1990
- Lardoglyphus zacheri Oudemans, 1927
