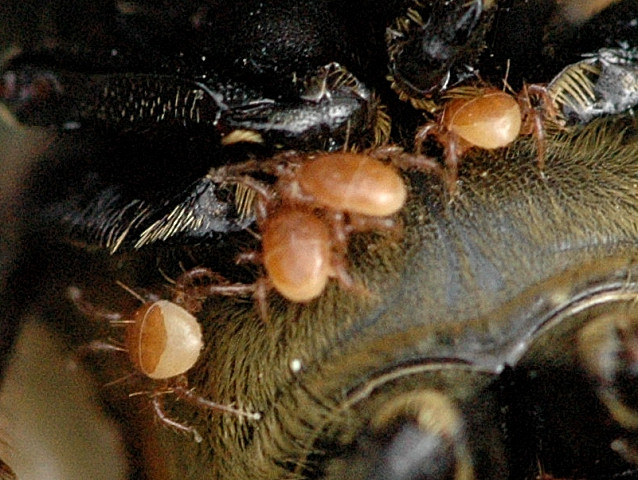
- Poecilochirus carabi

Scientific classification
- Kingdom: Animalia
- Phylum: Arthropoda
- Subphylum: Chelicerata
- Class: Arachnida
- Order: Mesostigmata
- Family: Parasitidae
- Subfamily: Parasitinae
- Genus: Poecilochirus; G. & R. Canestrini, 1882

Type species
- Poecilochirus carabi G. & R. Canestrini, 1882

= Poecilochirus =

Genus of mites

Poecilochirus is a Holarctic genus of mites in the family Parasitidae. They are relatively large (ca. 0.5-1mm) and often found on rotting corpses, where they are transported by beetles. Deuteronymphs are characterized by two orange dorsal shields and in many species a transverse band on the sternal shield. The juvenile development consists of a larval stage (three pairs of legs), protonymph, and deuteronymph, but no tritonymph. Females are smaller than males. Males guard female deuteronymphs shortly before these mate, and pairs mate venter-to-venter.

Reportedly, some nematodes in the family Allantonematidae are parasites of mites in this genus. Although some species from this genus have been described and sampled on previous real forensic cases or successional studies on carcasses, their usefulness as a forensic marker in forensic entomology has been recently appreciated.

== Phoresy on carrion beetles ==
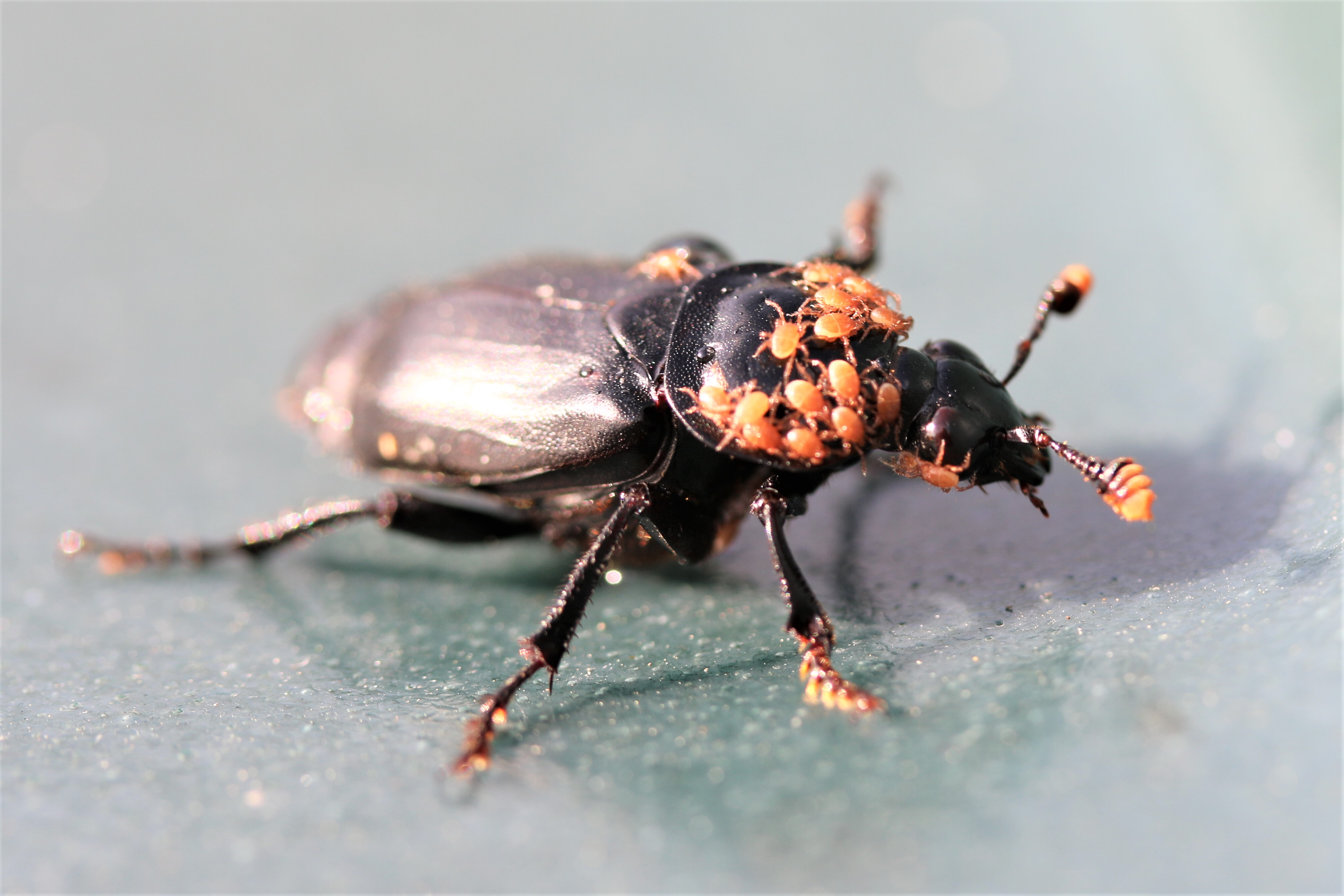
Nicrophorus humator carrying Poecilochirus mite deutonymphs

At least eight species of the genus are carried from one food source to another by beetles of multiple genera in the family Silphidae, most notably burying beetles. The mite deutonymphs sit on the adult beetles, typically between the coxae or under the elytrons. The beetles breed on carrion, which some species bury. Once arrived on carrion, the mites leave the beetles, feed on the carrion, and develop into adults. The entire life cycle of the mites takes place on the carrion, and the young mites later leave again with the beetles.

Poecilochirus mite on American carrion beetle on dead vole.

The probably best studied species are from the Poecilochirus carabi species complex that consists of at least two species (P. carabi and P. necrophori). In Europe, the two mite species are specialized on two different species of burying beetles, Nicrophorus vespilloides and Nicrophorus vespillo. The mites can recognize their main host beetle species and can produce more offspring along their preferred host beetle. Similarly, two genetic lines of Poecilochirus carabi mites have been reported from North America, which specialize on different sets of Nicrophorus hosts in some populations.

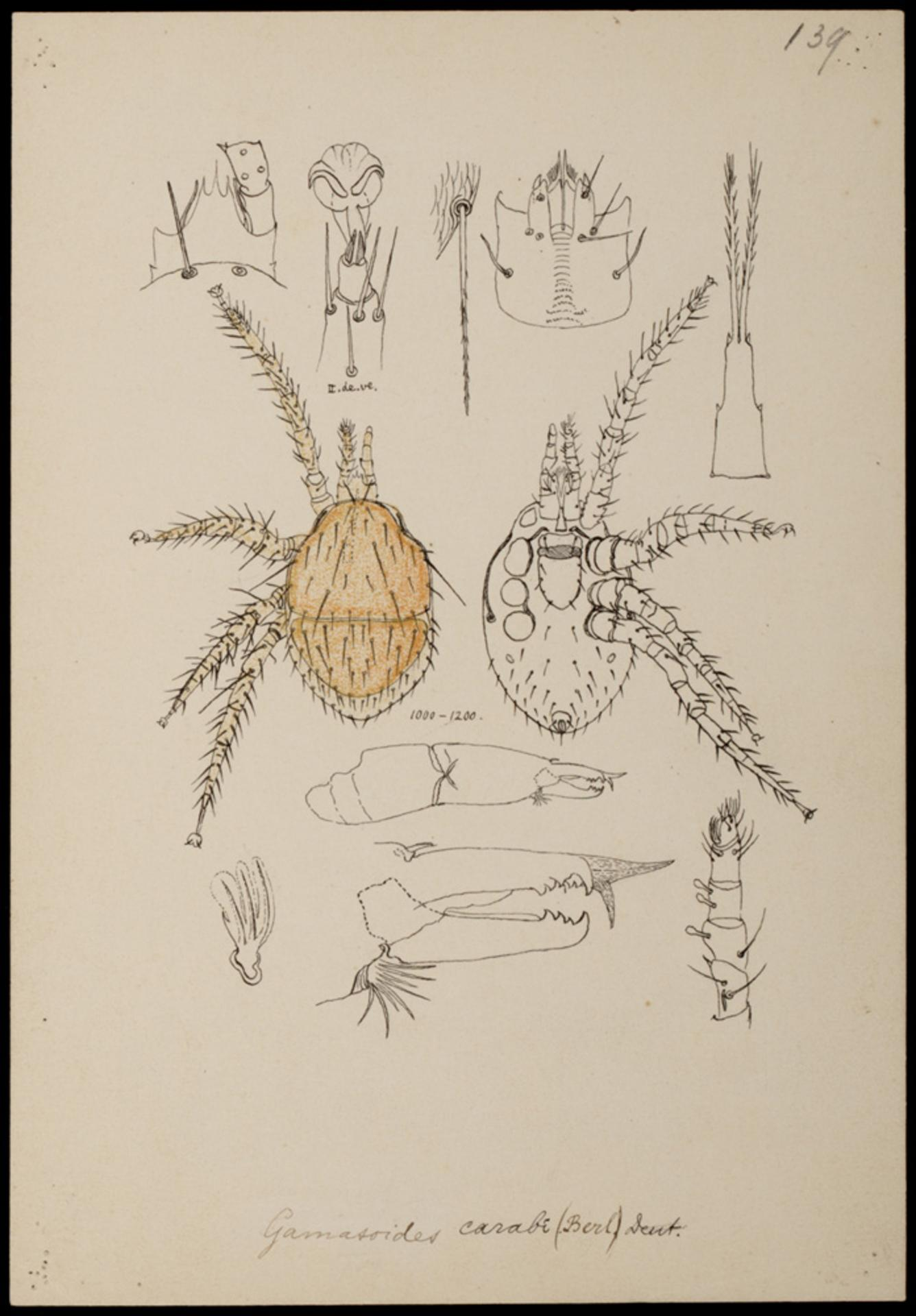
Poecilochirus (Gamasoides) carabi drawing by Oudemans

It is debated whether the mites harm the beetles or benefit them. Under certain conditions, the mites appear to protect the beetles' larvae or their food supply from fly larvae, but the presence of mites on beetle-tended carcasses also reduces male beetle life span and the number of beetle offspring.

== Species and identification ==
There is no recent treatment of the genus Poecilochirus. Identification keys mostly rely on the extent of a dark band across the sternal shield, the size of the dorsal shields, the doral chaetotaxy (mainly the length of the setae), and appendices of the fixed digit of the chelicerae. The first description of all life stages was published by Neumann.

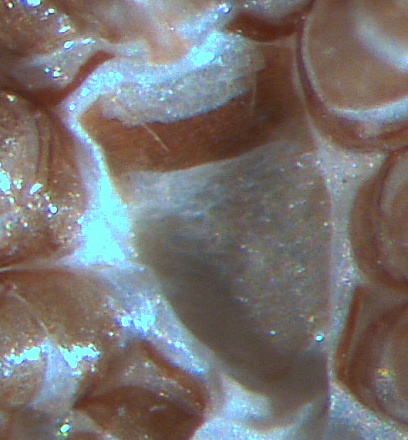
Sternal shield of Poecilochirus necrophori, with the typical dark transversal band

Species	Synonyms	Habitat / Host species
Poecilochirus armatus Trägårdh, 1912		
Poecilochirus austroasiaticus Vitzhum, 1930	P. nordi	Nicrophorus and other Silphid beetles
Poecilochirus belkahvensis Ramaraju & Madanlar, 1998		mushroom compost
Poecilochirus belovae Davydova, 1975	P. donatus	
Poecilochirus britannicus Hyatt, 1986		
Poecilochirus carabi G. Canestrini & R. Canestrini, 1882	Gamasoides carabi, P. fucorum	Nicrophorus vespilloides (main host), other Nicrophorus & Silphid beetles
Poecilochirus coimbatorensis Vishnupriya & Mohanasundaram, 1988		
Poecilochirus coleophorae Ramaraju & Mohanasundaram, 1997		beetles: Rutelidae, Scarabaeidae
Poecilochirus davydovae Hyatt, 1980		Nicrophorus and other Silphid beetles
Poecilochirus hyatti Ramaraju & Madanlar, 1998		mushroom compost
Poecilochirus macgillavryi Oudemans, 1927		
Poecilochirus monospinosus Wise, Hennessey & Axtell, 1988		chicken manure
Poecilochirus mrciaki Masan, 1999		Nicrophorus and other Silphid beetles
Poecilochirus necrophori Vitzthum, 1930		Nicrophorus vespillo (main host), other Nicrophorus & Silphid beetles
Poecilochirus pilosula Banks, 1904		Nicrophorus beetles
Poecilochirus rutellae Ramaraju & Mohanasundaram, 1997		beetles: Rutelidae, Scarabaeidae
Poecilochirus sexclavatus Skljar, 2002		Nicrophorus and other beetles
Poecilochirus simplisetae Ramaraju & Madanlar, 1998		mushroom compost
Poecilochirus subterraneus Muller, 1859		Nicrophorus and other Silphid beetles
Poecilochirus torbaliensis Ramaraju & Madanlar, 1998		mushroom compost

A study of the Poecilochirus carabi complex genetics suggests that the species complex consists of many more than only two species (P. necrophori and P. carabi). The mites from Asia and America that would previously have been identified as P. carabi based on their morphology are from distinct genetic lineages. Data suggest that there may be 17 different P. carabi complex species that are not yet described. In addition, the mites that have been identified as P. subterraneus based on their morphology also likely belong to more than one species.
