= Phoresis =

Temporary commensalism for transport

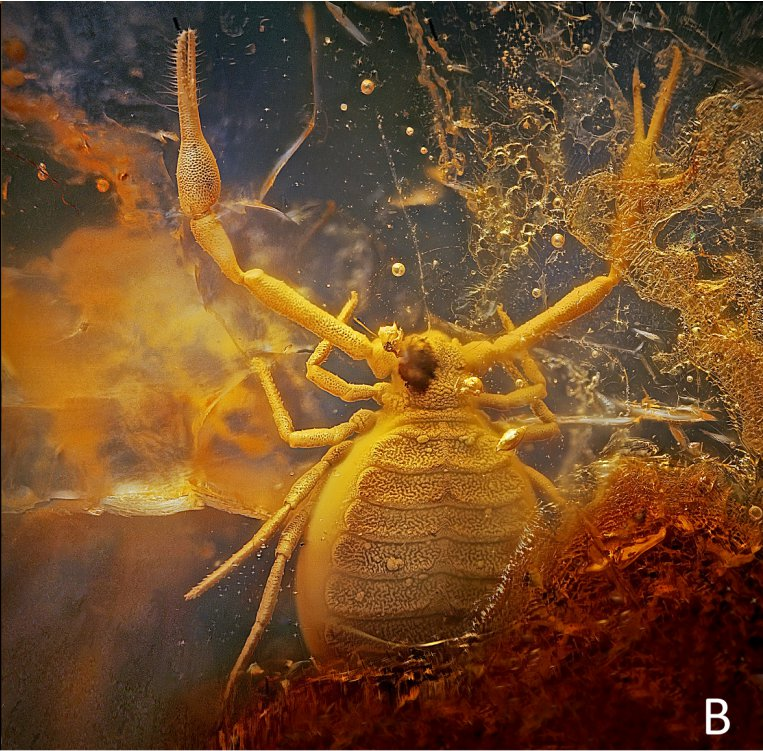
Pseudogarypus synchrotron Henderickx et al. 2012 specimen in Baltic amber.

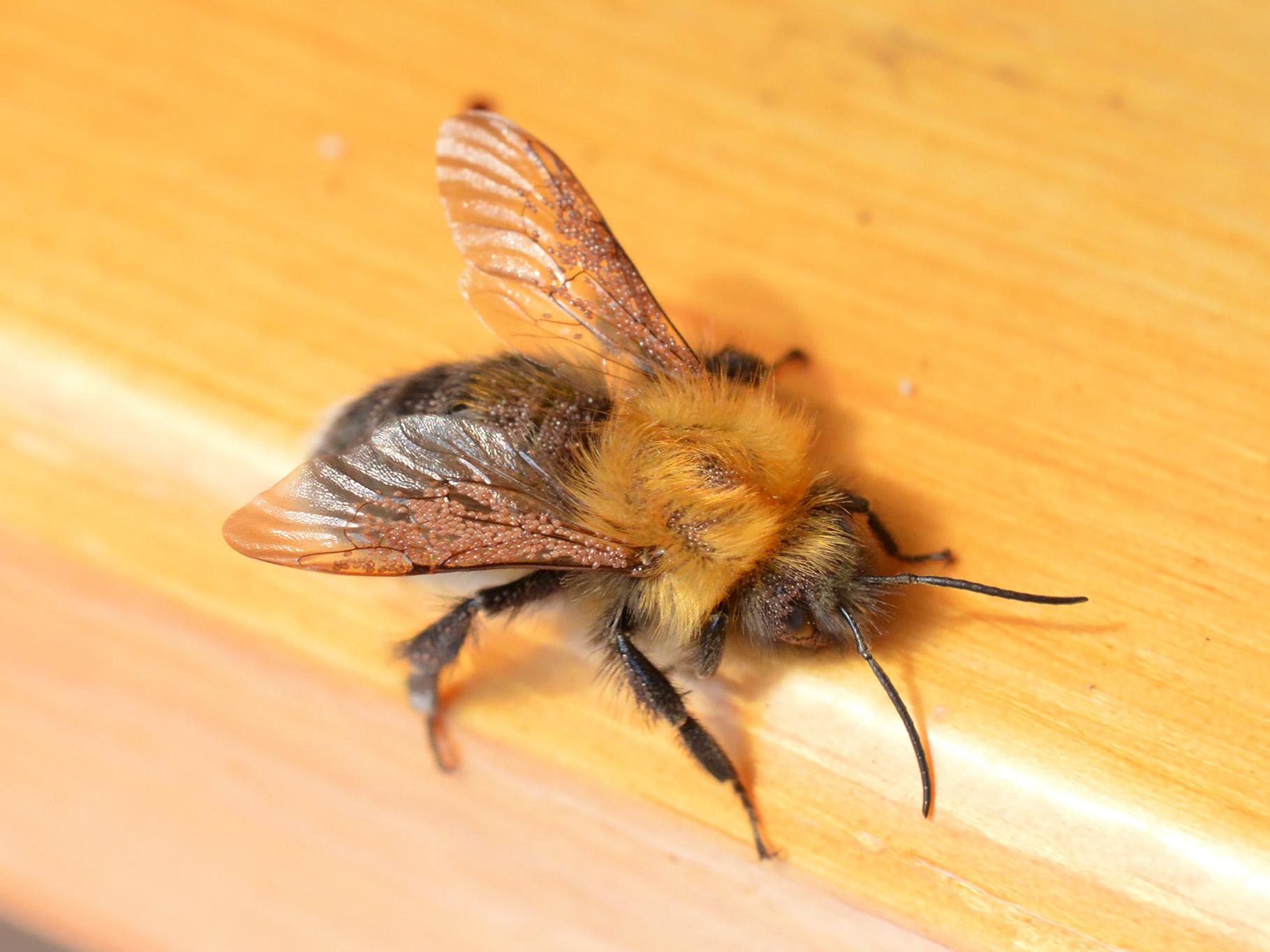
Male Bombus hypnorum with phoretic mites. Botevgrad, Bulgaria.

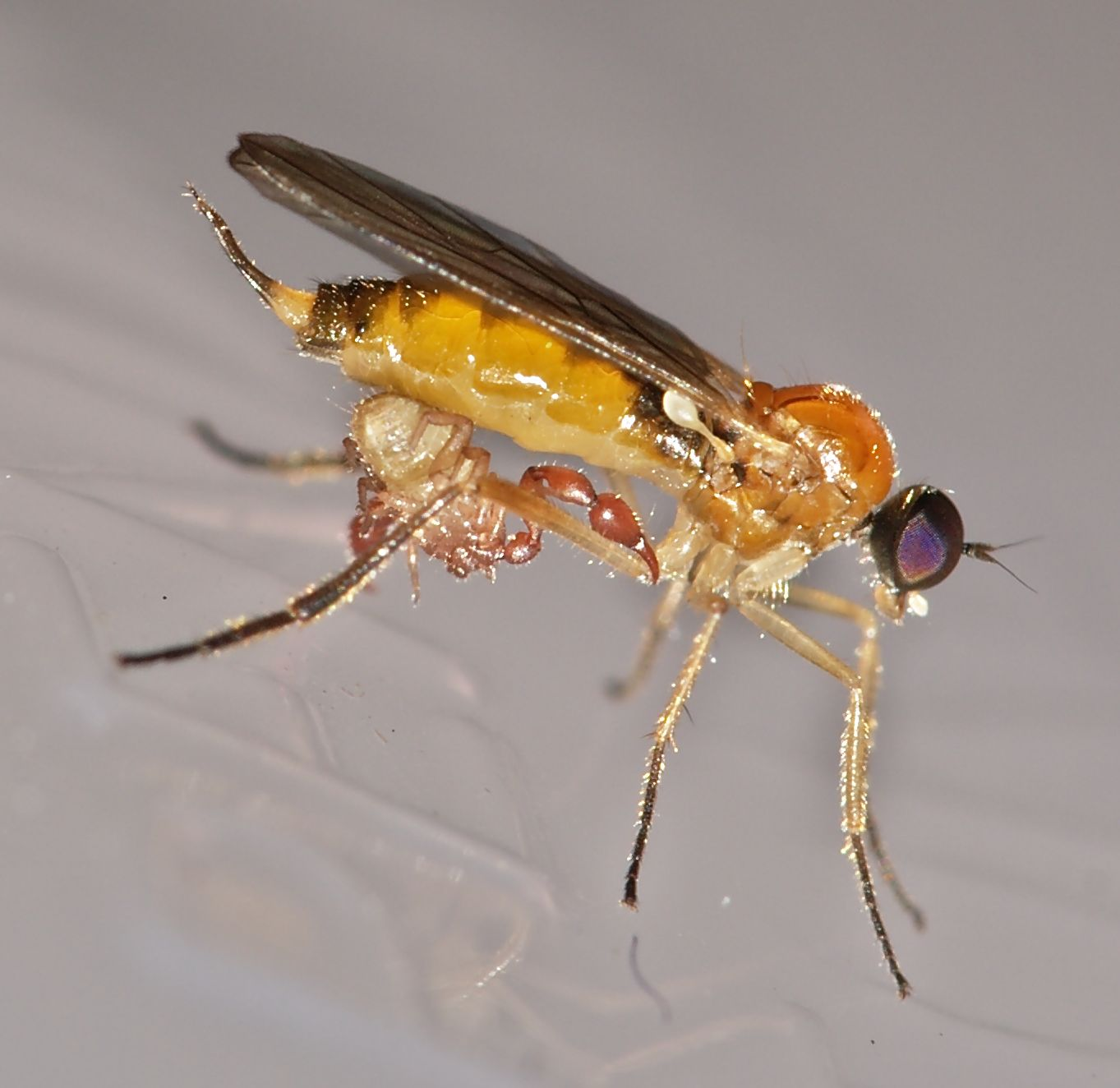
Pseudoscorpion hitching a ride on a fly

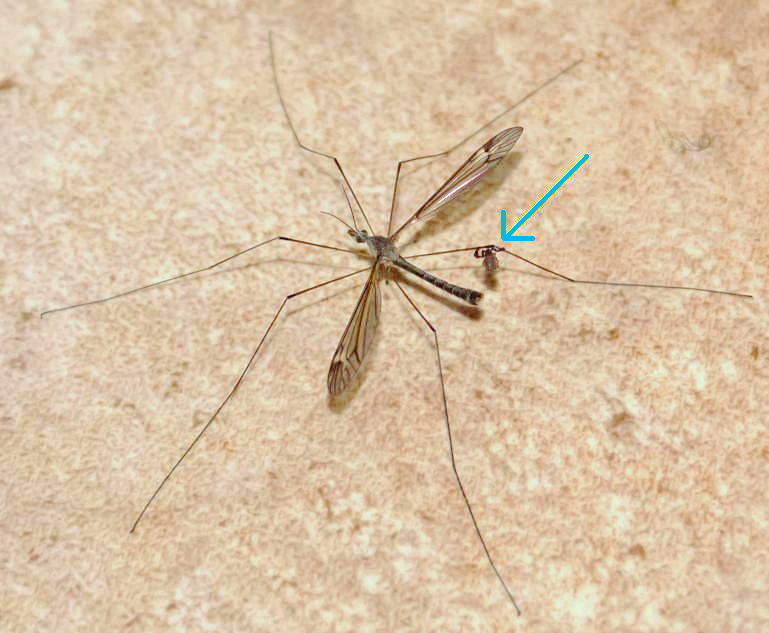
A pseudoscorpion on the leg of a crane fly

Phoresis or phoresy is a temporary commensalistic relationship when an organism (a phoront or phoretic) attaches itself to a host organism solely for travel. It has been seen in ticks and mites since the 18th century, and in fossils 320 million years old. It is not restricted to arthropods or animals; plants with seeds that disperse by attaching themselves to animals are also considered to be phoretic.

Phoresis is rooted in the Greek words phoras (bearing) and phor (thief). The term, originally defined in 1896 as a relationship in which the host acts as a vehicle for its passenger, clashed with other terminology being developed at the time, so constraints on the length of time, feeding, and ontogeny are now considered. Phoresis is used as a strategy for dispersal, seasonal migration, transport to new host/habitat, escaping ephemeral habitats, and reducing inbreeding depression. In addition to the benefits afforded to individuals and species, its presence can add to the ecological diversity and complexity of an ecosystem.

== Mutualism, parasitism, and predation ==
The strict definition of phoresis excludes cases in which the relationship is permanent (e.g. that of a barnacle surviving on a whale), or those in which the phoront gains any kind of advantage from the host organism (e.g. remoras attaching to sharks for transportation and food). Phoresis is a commensal relationship, and deviations result in mutualistic or parasitic relationships. Phoretic relationships can become parasitic if a cost is inflicted upon the host, such as if the number of mites on a host begins impeding its movement. Parasitic relationships could also be selected from phoretic ones if the phoront gains a fitness advantage from the death of a host (e.g. nutrition). Mutualistic relationships could also develop if the phoront begins to confer a benefit to the host (e.g. predator defense). The evolutionary plasticity of phoretic relationships allow them to potentially add to the complexity and diversity of ecosystems.

Cases in which the phoront parasitizes or preys upon the host organism after travel are still considered phoresis, as long as the travel behaviour and the feeding or parasitizing behaviour are separate. As an example, some pseudoscorpions prey upon the same species that act as their phoretic host, but the behaviours are completely separate: the pseudoscorpion utilizes anatomical features used specifically for predation when treating the host as prey, but employs anatomical features used for phoresis when travelling.

== Examples ==
Examples may be found in the arthropods associated with sloths. Coprophagous sloth moths, such as Bradipodicola hahneli and Cryptoses choloepi, are unusual in that they exclusively inhabit the fur of sloths, mammals found in Central and South America. The sloth provides transport for the moths, the females of which oviposit in the droppings of sloths, which the larvae feed on. The newly eclosed moths move into the forest canopy in search of a new sloth host.

Larvae of the blister beetle (Meloe franciscanus) need to find the nests of their host, the solitary bee (Habropoda pallida), to continue their life cycle. The larvae gather in colonies, and emit chemicals that mimic the pheromones of the female solitary bee. Larvae attach to the attracted males when they visit the false source of pheromones, and then subsequently to any female the male mates with. The blister beetle larvae then infest and parasitize the female bee's nest.

Some species of Bromeliad treefrog (Scinax littoreus and Scinax perpusillus) carry ostracods (Elpidium sp.), which in turn carry ciliates (Lagenophrys sp.) from one bromeliad plant to another. The plants act as ecological islands to the ostracods, and phoresis allows them to disperse over a wider area than would be available to them otherwise. The term for a phoretic organism riding on another phoretic organism is hyperphoresis.

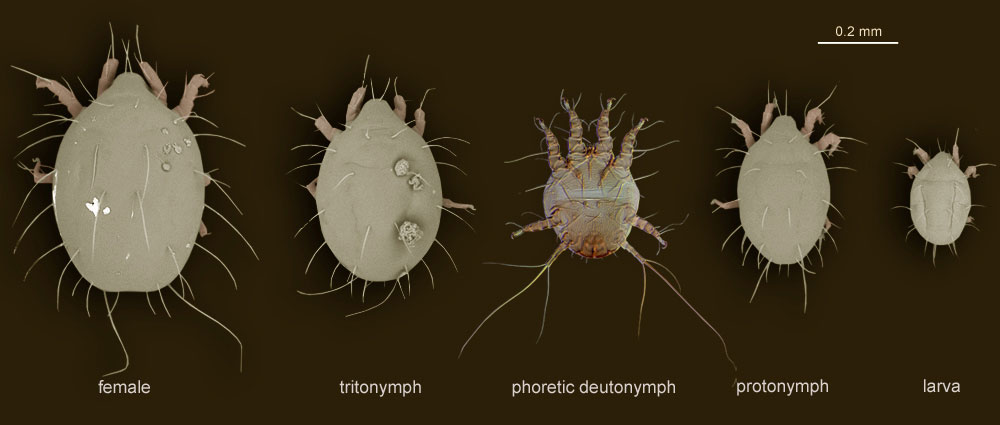
The phoretic deutonymph of the bee mite Chaetodactylus krombeini shows distinct morphological adaptations for phoresy relative to other parts of its life cycle.

Some mites in the clade Astigmatina have a stage of their life cycle (the deutonymph or hypopus) that is modified specifically for phoresis. This stage has reduced mouthparts, a well-sclerotised body that resists desiccation, and usually a posteroventral organ for attaching to the host animal (which may be an invertebrate or a vertebrate). Astigmatans often live in patchy and ephemeral habitats such as fungal fruiting bodies, dung, carrion, animal nests, tree sap flows and decaying wood. Phoresis allows these mites to quickly leave a depleted habitat and travel to a new one. A specific example are the deutonymphs of Lardoglyphus dispersing on beetles in the genus Dermestes to reach new habitats (both phoront and host feed on animal materials).

A specialist mite (Parasitellus fucorum) that parasitizes bumble bees (Bombus spp.) avoids inbreeding depression in a single hive, and remains genetically independent of any specific host lineage by travelling to a new hive. This is accomplished by travelling on a foraging bee to a flower and detaching, and waiting for and attaching to another bee which may be from another hive, and infesting the new hive. These mites can survive on flowers for up to 24 hours, and have shown a preference for opened flowers, where they would be most likely to find a host.

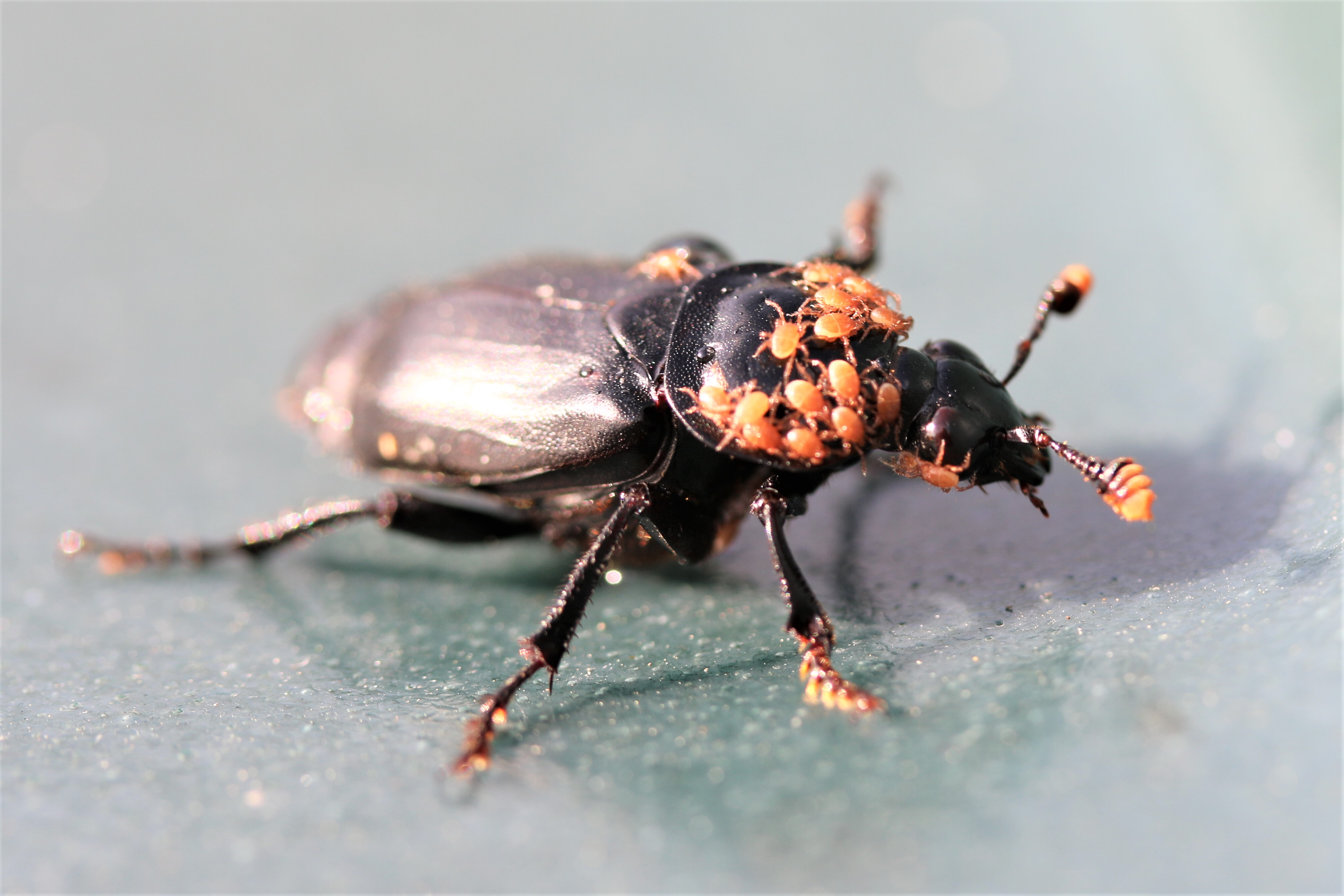
Burying beetle with Poecilochirus mites

Dung and carrion are ephemeral habitats that are frequently visited by beetles (such as dung beetles and burying beetles). Phoretic nematodes (Rhabditoides) and mites (e.g. genera Macrocheles, Poecilochirus, Uroobovella) use the beetles to reach these rich resources, where they themselves reproduce.

The pseudoscorpion Cordylochernes scorpioides often "hitchikes" on harlequin beetles (Acrocinus longimanus). Initially, there were a number of alternate hypothesis for why the pseudoscorpions were found on the beetles: by accident, to forage for mites inhabiting the beetle, or as an obligate parasite. Evidence suggested, however, that the pseudoscorpions were using beetles to travel from tree to tree, where they preyed upon other beetle larvae.

If their host dies, lice can opportunistically use phoresis to hitch a ride on a fly, and attempt to find a new host.

The largest mammalian example of phoresis is human beings directly riding on horses or other animals, or using them to pull vehicles with humans in them.

== See also ==
- Animal locomotion § Animal transport
- Hitchhiking
