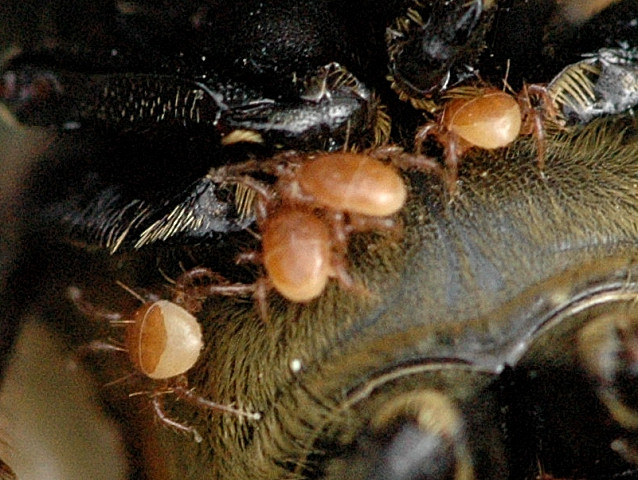
- Poecilochirus carabi

Scientific classification
- Kingdom: Animalia
- Phylum: Arthropoda
- Subphylum: Chelicerata
- Class: Arachnida
- Order: Mesostigmata
- Suborder: Parasitina
- Superfamily: Parasitoidea; Oudemans, 1901
- Family: Parasitidae (Oudemans, 1901)

Subfamilies
- Parasitinae; Pergamasinae

= Parasitidae =

Family of mites

Parasitidae is a family of predatory mites in the order Mesostigmata that has worldwide distribution. They are the only family in the superfamily Parasitoidea. Relatively large for mites, their color is often yellowish to dark brown. The family as a whole preys on a wide variety of microarthropods and nematodes, with individual species usually having a narrower range of prey. The family contains two subfamilies, 29 genera, and around 400 species.

The subfamily Pergamasinae is normally found in the soil, and dispersal via phoresy is not known in this subfamily. It contains 9 genera. Most species are bisexual.

The subfamily Parasitinae is normally found in nests of small animals or insects or in decaying organic matter, from seaweed to forest litter. This subfamily contains 20 genera. These mites disperse via phoresy in the deuteronymph stage of their life cycle. The genus Parasitellus is associated with bumblebees, and other genus with other bees, leading to the common name "bee mites". Other genera disperse on various beetles, e.g. Poecilochirus on burying beetles, leading to the name "beetle mites" which is also shared with the order of mites Oribatida, who have the name for a different reason.

== Taxonomy ==
Parasitidae contains three taxonomic groups – two subfamilies and a group of genera not yet placed:

Subfamily Parasitinae Oudemans, 1901

- Gamasodes Oudemans, 1939
- Nemnichia Oudemans, 1936
- Oocarpais Berlese, 1916
- Parasitellus Willmann, 1939
- Parasitus Latreille, 1795
- Poecilochirus G. Canestrini & R. Canestrini, 1882
- Porrhostaspis Mueller, 1859
- Trachygamasus Berlese, 1906
- Willmanniella Götz, 1969

Subfamily Pergamasinae Juvara-Bals, 1976

- Cycetogamasus C. Athias-Henriot, 1980
- Heteroparasitus Juvara-Bals, 1976
- Holoparasitus Oudemans, 1936
- Ologamasiphis Holzmann, 1969
- Pergamasus Berlese, 1903

Incertae sedis

- Aclerogamasus Athias, 1971
- Anadenosternum C. Athias-Henriot, 1980
- Carpaidion C. Athias-Henriot, 1979
- Colpothylax C. Athias-Henriot, 1980
- Cornigamasus G. O. Evans & W. M. Till, 1979
- Dicrogamasus C. Athias-Henriot, 1980
- Erithosoma C. Athias-Henriot, 1979
- Leptogamasus Trägårdh, 1936
- Mixogamasus Juvara-Bals, 1972
- Paracarpais C. Athias-Henriot, 1978
- Pergamasellus Evans, 1957
- Phityogamasus Juvara-Bals & Athias-Henriot, 1972
- Phorytocarpais C. Athias-Henriot, 1979
- Psilogamasus Athias-Henriot, 1969
- Rhabdocarpais C. Athias-Henriot, 1981
- Schizosthetus C. Athias-Henriot, 1982
- Taiwanoparasitus Tseng, 1995
- Zelogamasus M. K. Hennessey & M. H. Farrier, 1989
