= Afrocypholaelaps africanus =

Scientific classification
- Kingdom: Animalia
- Phylum: Arthropoda
- Subphylum: Chelicerata
- Class: Arachnida
- Order: Mesostigmata
- Family: Ameroseiidae
- Genus: Afrocypholaelaps
- Species: A. africanus

Binomial name
- Afrocypholaelaps africanus Evans, 1963

Species of mite

Afrocypholaelaps africanus is a species of mite in the family Ameroseiidae.
