= Sertitympanum exarmatum =

Scientific classification
- Domain: Eukaryota
- Kingdom: Animalia
- Phylum: Arthropoda
- Subphylum: Chelicerata
- Class: Arachnida
- Order: Mesostigmata
- Family: Ameroseiidae
- Genus: Sertitympanum
- Species: S. exarmatum

Binomial name
- Sertitympanum exarmatum Elsen & Whitaker, 1985

Species of mite

Sertitympanum exarmatum is a species of mite in the family Ameroseiidae.
