= Ameroseius delicatus =

Scientific classification
- Domain: Eukaryota
- Kingdom: Animalia
- Phylum: Arthropoda
- Subphylum: Chelicerata
- Class: Arachnida
- Order: Mesostigmata
- Family: Ameroseiidae
- Genus: Ameroseius
- Species: A. delicatus

Binomial name
- Ameroseius delicatus Berlese, 1918

Species of mite

Ameroseius delicatus is a species of mite in the family Ameroseiidae.
