= Epicriopsis horrida =

Scientific classification
- Domain: Eukaryota
- Kingdom: Animalia
- Phylum: Arthropoda
- Subphylum: Chelicerata
- Class: Arachnida
- Order: Mesostigmata
- Family: Ameroseiidae
- Genus: Epicriopsis
- Species: E. horrida

Binomial name
- Epicriopsis horrida (Kramer, 1876)

Species of mite

Epicriopsis horrida is a species of mite in the family Ameroseiidae. It is found in Europe.
