= Neocypholaelaps cocos =

Scientific classification
- Kingdom: Animalia
- Phylum: Arthropoda
- Subphylum: Chelicerata
- Class: Arachnida
- Order: Mesostigmata
- Family: Ameroseiidae
- Genus: Neocypholaelaps
- Species: N. cocos

Binomial name
- Neocypholaelaps cocos Evans, 1963

Species of mite

Neocypholaelaps cocos is a species of mite in the family Ameroseiidae.
