= Ameroseius denticulatus =

Scientific classification
- Domain: Eukaryota
- Kingdom: Animalia
- Phylum: Arthropoda
- Subphylum: Chelicerata
- Class: Arachnida
- Order: Mesostigmata
- Family: Ameroseiidae
- Genus: Ameroseius
- Species: A. denticulatus

Binomial name
- Ameroseius denticulatus Gu & Guo, 1997

Species of mite

Ameroseius denticulatus is a species of mite in the family Ameroseiidae.
