= Ameroseius laelaptoides =

Scientific classification
- Domain: Eukaryota
- Kingdom: Animalia
- Phylum: Arthropoda
- Subphylum: Chelicerata
- Class: Arachnida
- Order: Mesostigmata
- Family: Ameroseiidae
- Genus: Ameroseius
- Species: A. laelaptoides

Binomial name
- Ameroseius laelaptoides Berlese, 1904

Species of mite

Ameroseius laelaptoides is a species of mite in the family Ameroseiidae.
