= Hattena floricola =

Scientific classification
- Domain: Eukaryota
- Kingdom: Animalia
- Phylum: Arthropoda
- Subphylum: Chelicerata
- Class: Arachnida
- Order: Mesostigmata
- Family: Ameroseiidae
- Genus: Hattena
- Species: H. floricola

Binomial name
- Hattena floricola Halliday, 1997

Species of mite

Hattena floricola is a species of mite in the family Ameroseiidae.
