= Hattena erosa =

Scientific classification
- Kingdom: Animalia
- Phylum: Arthropoda
- Subphylum: Chelicerata
- Class: Arachnida
- Order: Mesostigmata
- Family: Ameroseiidae
- Genus: Hattena
- Species: H. erosa

Binomial name
- Hattena erosa Domrow, 1963

Species of mite

Hattena erosa is a species of mite in the family Ameroseiidae.
