= Hattena incisa =

Scientific classification
- Kingdom: Animalia
- Phylum: Arthropoda
- Subphylum: Chelicerata
- Class: Arachnida
- Order: Mesostigmata
- Family: Ameroseiidae
- Genus: Hattena
- Species: H. incisa

Binomial name
- Hattena incisa Halliday, 1997

Species of mite

Hattena incisa is a species of mite in the family Ameroseiidae, which was first described in 1997 by Robert Bruce Halliday.

It has been found on mangrove flowers in the Northern Territory, Australia.
