= Hattena panopla =

Scientific classification
- Domain: Eukaryota
- Kingdom: Animalia
- Phylum: Arthropoda
- Subphylum: Chelicerata
- Class: Arachnida
- Order: Mesostigmata
- Family: Ameroseiidae
- Genus: Hattena
- Species: H. panopla

Binomial name
- Hattena panopla Domrow, 1966

Species of mite

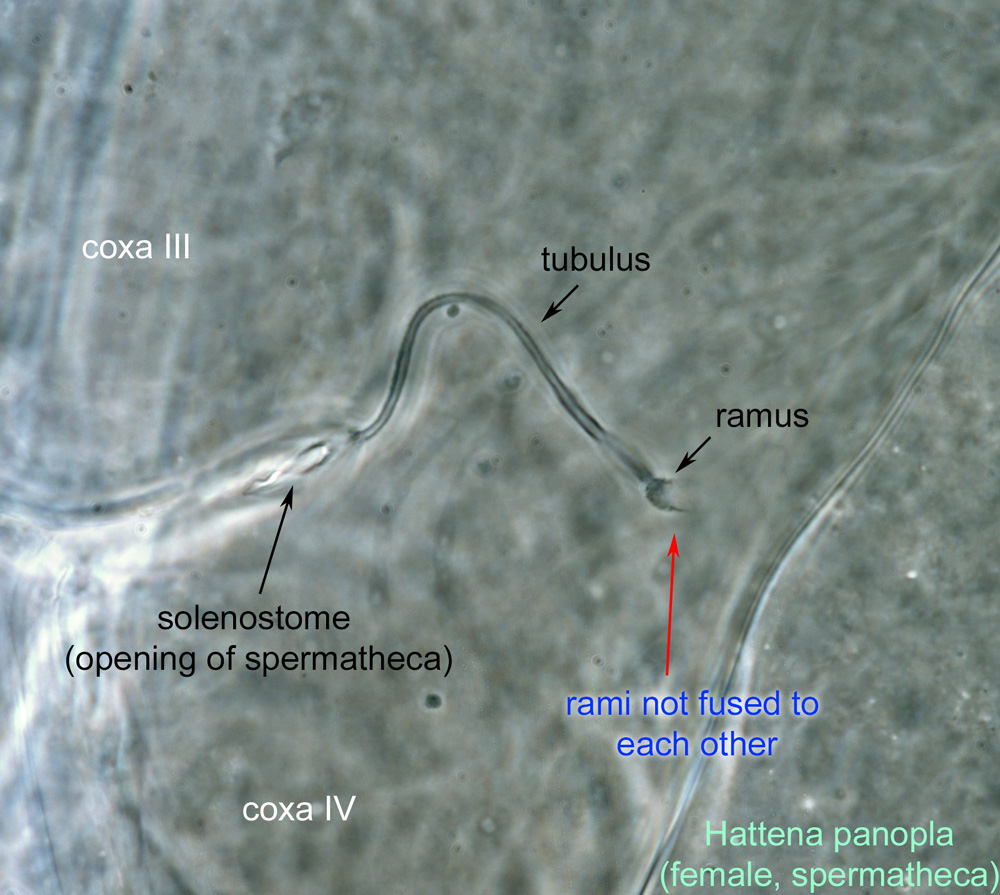

Hattena panopla is a species of mite in the family Ameroseiidae.
