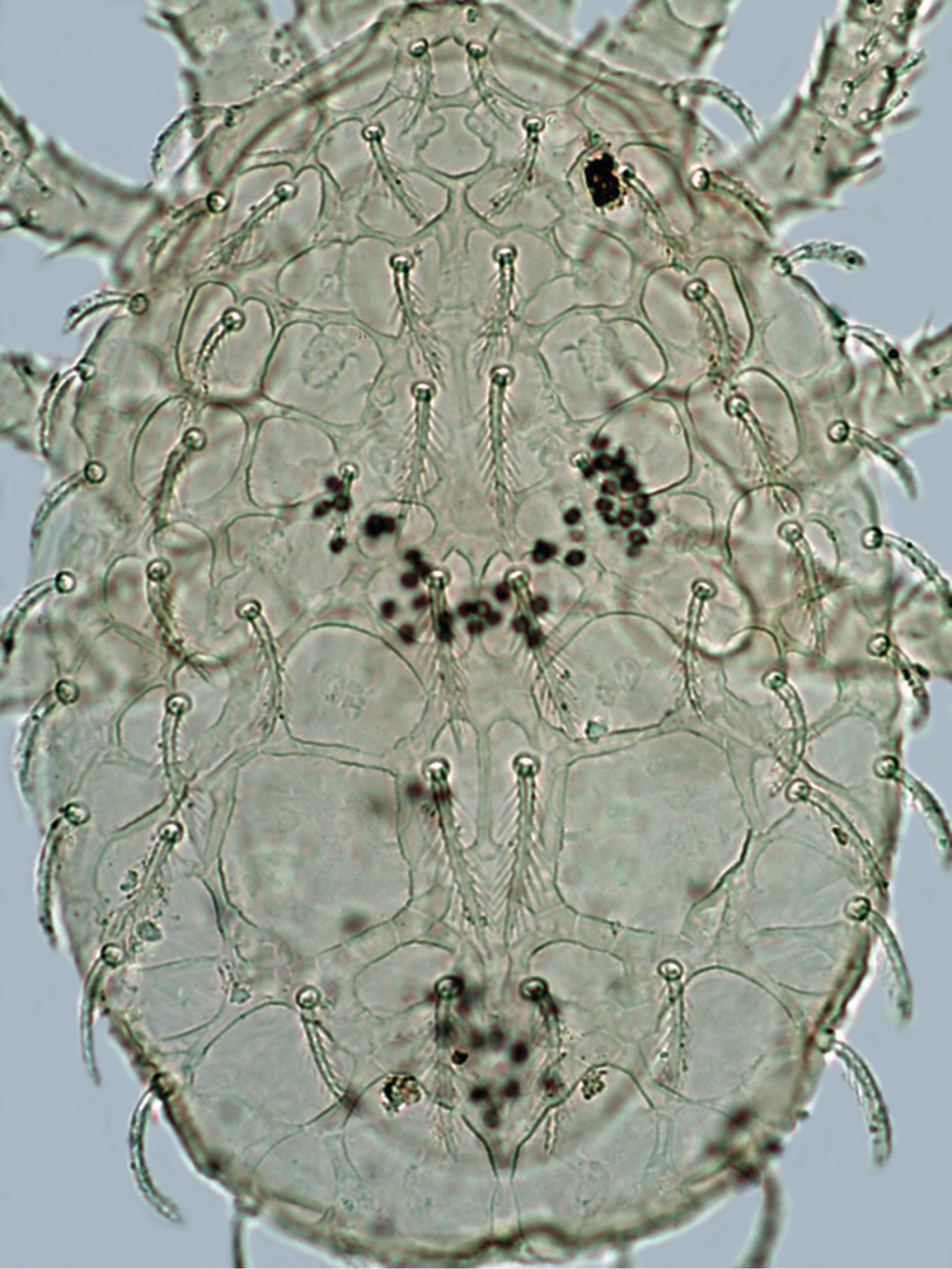
- Sinoseius lobatus

Scientific classification
- Kingdom: Animalia
- Phylum: Arthropoda
- Subphylum: Chelicerata
- Class: Arachnida
- Order: Mesostigmata
- Family: Ameroseiidae
- Genus: Sinoseius
- Species: S. lobatus

Binomial name
- Sinoseius lobatus Bai, Gu & Fang, 1995

Synonyms
- Sinoseius pinnatus Huhta & Karg, 2010

= Sinoseius lobatus =

Species of mite

Sinoseius lobatus is a species of mite in the family Ameroseiidae. It was first described in 1995 by Bai, Gu, and Fang.

== Description ==
Sinoseius lobatus is characterized by its unique lobed structures on the body, which is a distinguishing feature within its genus. The dorsal shield of the female is weakly sclerotized but coarsely ornamented, with 29 pairs of setae. The setae, including j1, are similar in length and form, and are pinnate.

== Habitat and distribution ==
Sinoseius lobatus is typically found in soil and leaf litter habitats. It has been recorded in various regions, including China and Europe, but detailed information about its exact distribution is limited. Further research is needed to map its range comprehensively.

== Ecological role ==
Mites in the family Ameroseiidae are often predators of small arthropods and nematodes. Sinoseius lobatus likely plays a role in controlling the population of soil-dwelling pests, contributing to the balance of the micro-ecosystem in which it resides.

== Taxonomy ==
The species was first described in a 1995 taxonomic revision by Bai, Gu, and Fang. It belongs to the genus Sinoseius, which includes several other species with similar morphological characteristics. The family Ameroseiidae, to which this species belongs, is part of the order Mesostigmata, known for its diverse range of predatory mites.

== Research and studies ==
Recent studies, such as the 2017 revision of the family Ameroseiidae by Peter Mašán, have provided extensive data on the morphology and classification of this species. These studies are crucial for understanding the evolutionary relationships within the family and identifying key characteristics for taxonomic purposes.
