= Epicriopsis walteri =

Scientific classification
- Domain: Eukaryota
- Kingdom: Animalia
- Phylum: Arthropoda
- Subphylum: Chelicerata
- Class: Arachnida
- Order: Mesostigmata
- Family: Ameroseiidae
- Genus: Epicriopsis
- Species: E. walteri

Binomial name
- Epicriopsis walteri Halliday, 1997

Species of mite

Epicriopsis walteri is a species of mite in the family Ameroseiidae.
