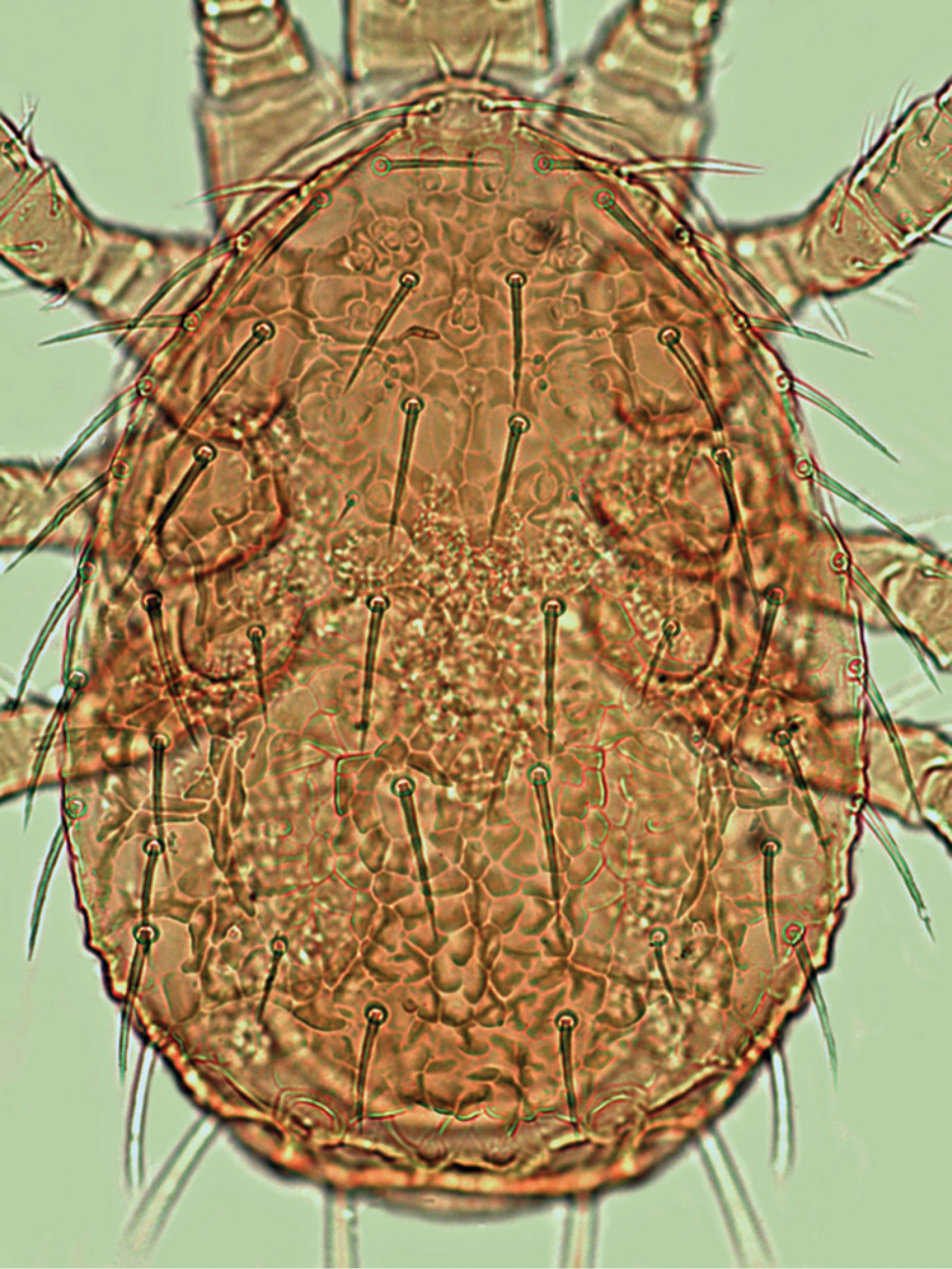

Scientific classification
- Domain: Eukaryota
- Kingdom: Animalia
- Phylum: Arthropoda
- Subphylum: Chelicerata
- Class: Arachnida
- Order: Mesostigmata
- Family: Ameroseiidae
- Genus: Ameroseius
- Species: A. callosus

Binomial name
- Ameroseius callosus Masan, 1998

= Ameroseius callosus =

Species of mite

Ameroseius callosus is a species of mite in the family Ameroseiidae.
