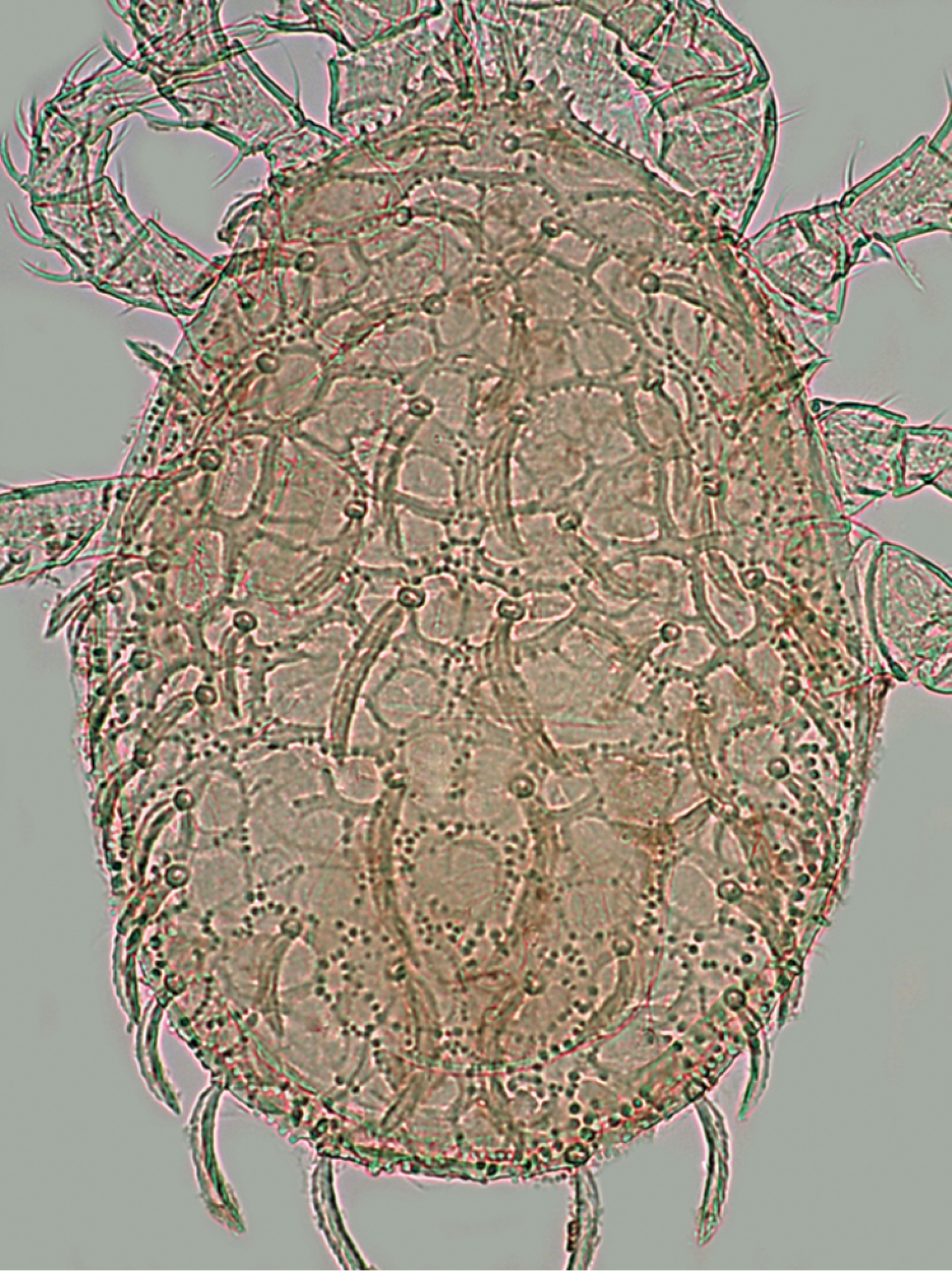

Scientific classification
- Domain: Eukaryota
- Kingdom: Animalia
- Phylum: Arthropoda
- Subphylum: Chelicerata
- Class: Arachnida
- Order: Mesostigmata
- Family: Ameroseiidae
- Genus: Ameroseius
- Species: A. lehtineni

Binomial name
- Ameroseius lehtineni Huhta & Karg, 2010

= Ameroseius lehtineni =

Species of mite

Ameroseius lehtineni is a species of mite first found in Finland.
