= Neocypholaelaps apicola =

Scientific classification
- Domain: Eukaryota
- Kingdom: Animalia
- Phylum: Arthropoda
- Subphylum: Chelicerata
- Class: Arachnida
- Order: Mesostigmata
- Family: Ameroseiidae
- Genus: Neocypholaelaps
- Species: N. apicola

Binomial name
- Neocypholaelaps apicola Delfinado-Baker & Baker, 1983

Species of mite

Neocypholaelaps apicola is a species of mite in the family Ameroseiidae.
