= Ameroseius sextuberculi =

Scientific classification
- Domain: Eukaryota
- Kingdom: Animalia
- Phylum: Arthropoda
- Subphylum: Chelicerata
- Class: Arachnida
- Order: Mesostigmata
- Family: Ameroseiidae
- Genus: Ameroseius
- Species: A. sextuberculi

Binomial name
- Ameroseius sextuberculi Karg, 1996

Species of mite

Ameroseius sextuberculi is a species of mite in the family Ameroseiidae.
