= Brontispalaelaps marianneae =

Scientific classification
- Domain: Eukaryota
- Kingdom: Animalia
- Phylum: Arthropoda
- Subphylum: Chelicerata
- Class: Arachnida
- Order: Mesostigmata
- Family: Ameroseiidae
- Genus: Brontispalaelaps
- Species: B. marianneae

Binomial name
- Brontispalaelaps marianneae Halliday, 1997

Species of mite

Brontispalaelaps marianneae is a species of mite in the family Ameroseiidae.
