= Ameroseius magnisetosa =

Scientific classification
- Domain: Eukaryota
- Kingdom: Animalia
- Phylum: Arthropoda
- Subphylum: Chelicerata
- Class: Arachnida
- Order: Mesostigmata
- Family: Ameroseiidae
- Genus: Ameroseius
- Species: A. magnisetosa

Binomial name
- Ameroseius magnisetosa Ishikawa, 1972

Species of mite

Ameroseius magnisetosa is a species of mite in the family Ameroseiidae.
