= Ameroseius cuiqishengi =

Scientific classification
- Domain: Eukaryota
- Kingdom: Animalia
- Phylum: Arthropoda
- Subphylum: Chelicerata
- Class: Arachnida
- Order: Mesostigmata
- Family: Ameroseiidae
- Genus: Ameroseius
- Species: A. cuiqishengi

Binomial name
- Ameroseius cuiqishengi Ma, 1995

Species of mite

Ameroseius cuiqishengi is a species of mite in the family Ameroseiidae.
