= Asperolaelaps =

Scientific classification
- Kingdom: Animalia
- Phylum: Arthropoda
- Subphylum: Chelicerata
- Class: Arachnida
- Order: Mesostigmata
- Family: Ameroseiidae
- Genus: Asperolaelaps; Womersley, 1956

Genus of mites

Asperolaelaps is a genus of mites in the family Ameroseiidae. There are at least two described species in Asperolaelaps.

== Species ==
These two species belong to the genus Asperolaelaps:

- Asperolaelaps rotundus Womersley, 1956
- Asperolaelaps sextuberculi (Karg, 1996)
