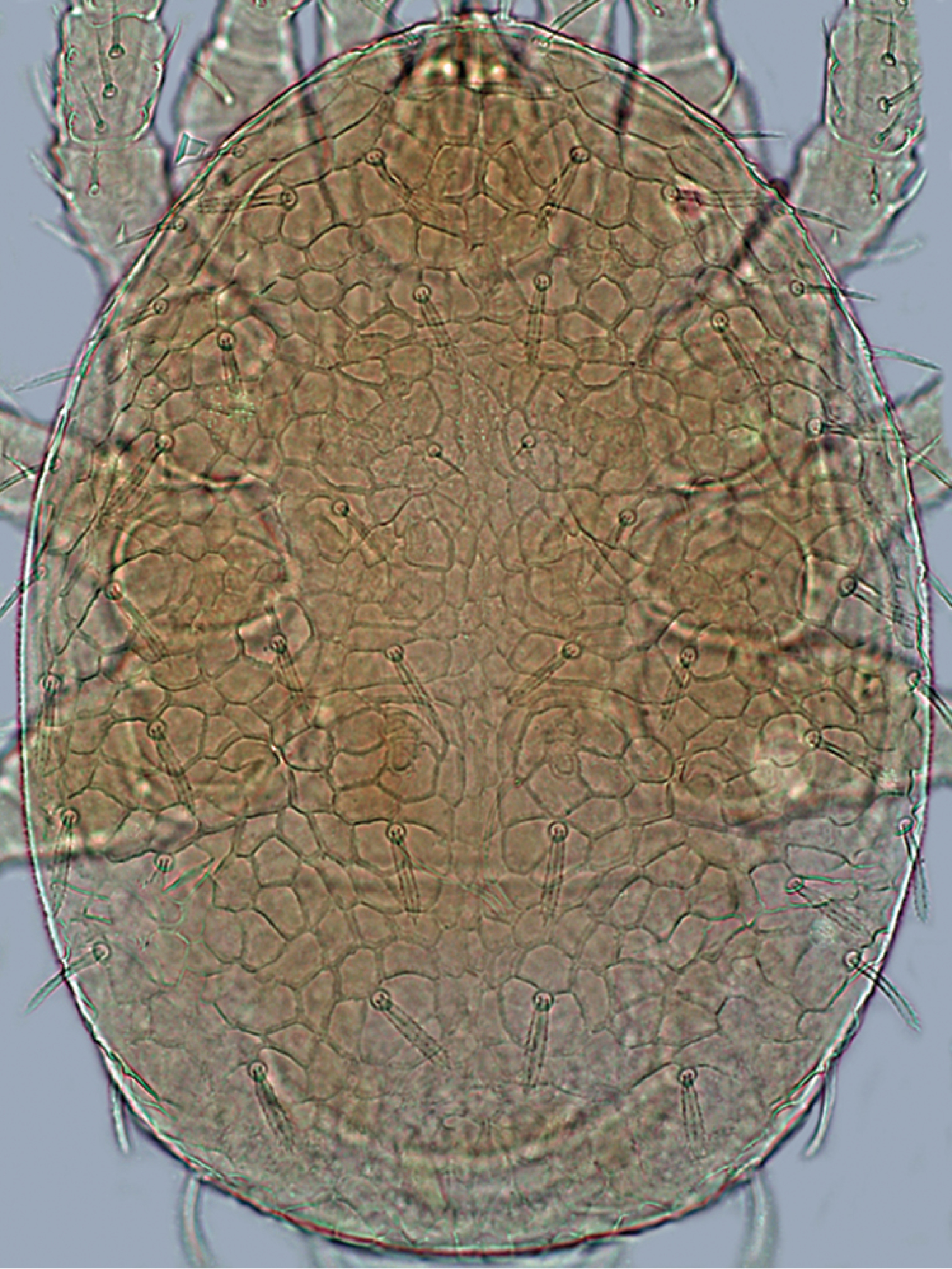
- Neocypholaelaps favus

Scientific classification
- Domain: Eukaryota
- Kingdom: Animalia
- Phylum: Arthropoda
- Subphylum: Chelicerata
- Class: Arachnida
- Order: Mesostigmata
- Family: Ameroseiidae
- Genus: Neocypholaelaps; Vitzthum, 1942

= Neocypholaelaps =

Genus of mites

Neocypholaelaps is a genus of mites in the family Ameroseiidae. There are more than 20 described species in Neocypholaelaps.

== Species ==
These 22 species belong to the genus Neocypholaelaps:

- Neocypholaelaps ampullula Berlese, 1910
- Neocypholaelaps apicola Delfinado-Baker & Baker, 1983
- Neocypholaelaps breviperitrematus Elsen, 1972
- Neocypholaelaps capitis Elsen, 1972
- Neocypholaelaps ceylonicus Narita & Moraes, 2011
- Neocypholaelaps cocos Evans, 1963
- Neocypholaelaps crocisae Elsen, 1972
- Neocypholaelaps favus Ishikawa, 1968
- Neocypholaelaps geonomae Moraes & Narita, 2010
- Neocypholaelaps hongkongensis Mo, 1969
- Neocypholaelaps indicus Evans, 1963
- Neocypholaelaps kreiteri Narita, Pedelabat & De Moraes, 2013
- Neocypholaelaps leopoldi Elsen, 1972
- Neocypholaelaps malayensis Delfinado-Baker, Baker & Phoon, 1989
- Neocypholaelaps novaehollandiae Evans, 1963
- Neocypholaelaps novus Elsen, 1972
- Neocypholaelaps phooni Baker & Delfinado-Baker, 1985
- Neocypholaelaps pradhani Gupta, 1969
- Neocypholaelaps stridulans Evans, 1955
- Neocypholaelaps varipilosus Elsen, 1972
- Neocypholaelaps wilsoni Allred, 1970
- Neocypholaelaps xylocopae Elsen, 1972
