= Sertitympanum =

Scientific classification
- Domain: Eukaryota
- Kingdom: Animalia
- Phylum: Arthropoda
- Subphylum: Chelicerata
- Class: Arachnida
- Order: Mesostigmata
- Family: Ameroseiidae
- Genus: Sertitympanum; Elsen & Whitaker, 1985

Genus of mites

Sertitympanum is a genus of mites in the family Ameroseiidae. There are about eight described species in Sertitympanum.

== Species ==
These eight species belong to the genus Sertitympanum:

- Sertitympanum aegyptiacum Nasr & Abou-Awad, 1986
- Sertitympanum contiguum Elsen & Whitaker, 1985
- Sertitympanum exarmatum Elsen & Whitaker, 1985
- Sertitympanum mexicanum Villegas-Guzman, Montiel-Parra, Vargas & Polaco, 2004
- Sertitympanum nodosum Sheals, 1962
- Sertitympanum palmatum Nasr & Abou-Awad, 1986
- Sertitympanum separationis Elsen & Whitaker, 1985
- Sertitympanum zaheri El-Badry, Nasr & Hafez, 1979
