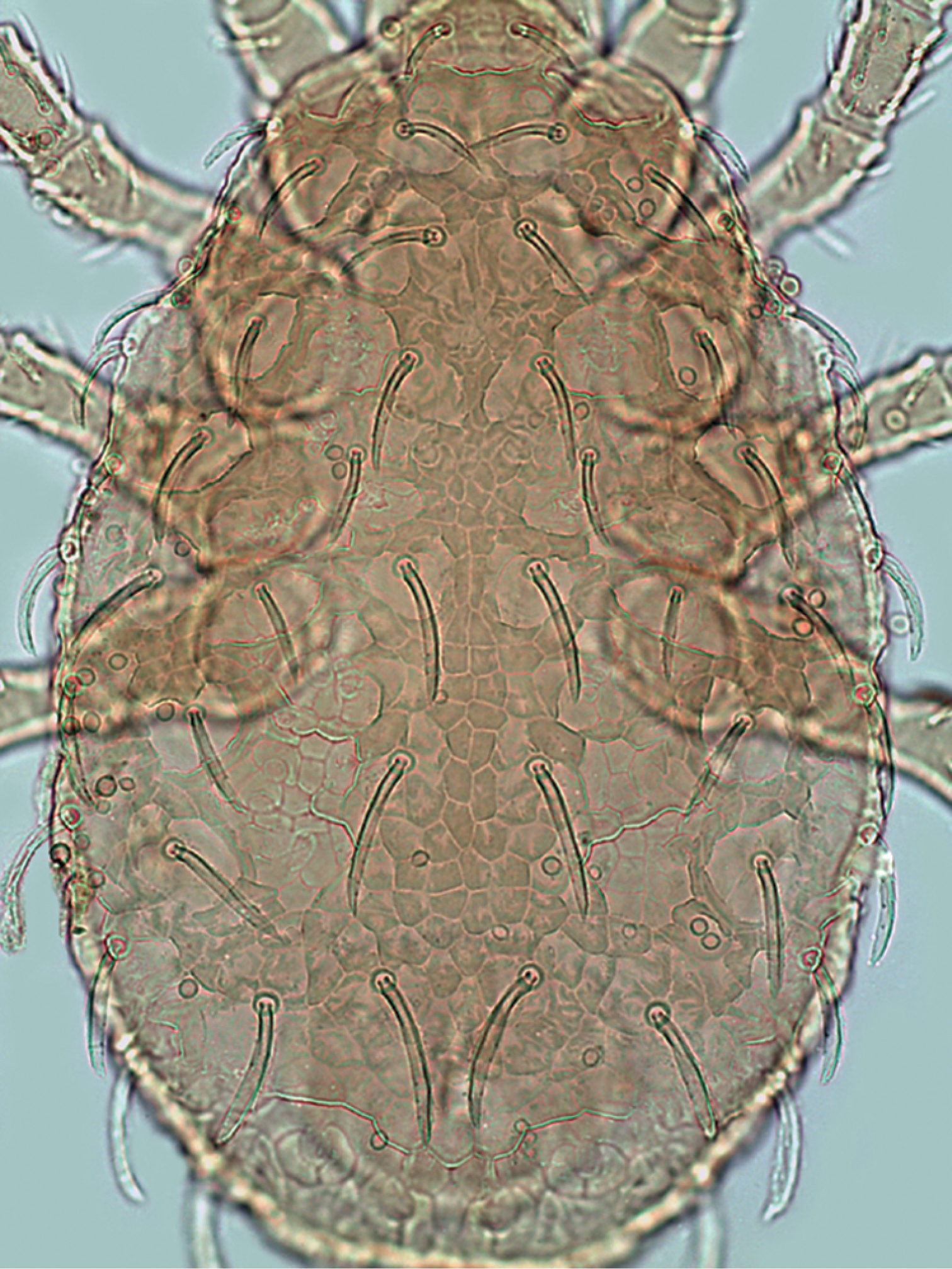
- Ameroseiella macrochelae

Scientific classification
- Domain: Eukaryota
- Kingdom: Animalia
- Phylum: Arthropoda
- Subphylum: Chelicerata
- Class: Arachnida
- Order: Mesostigmata
- Family: Ameroseiidae
- Genus: Ameroseiella; Bregetova, 1977

= Ameroseiella =

Genus of mites

Ameroseiella is a genus of mites in the family Ameroseiidae. There are at least three described species in Ameroseiella.

== Species ==
These three species belong to the genus Ameroseiella:

- Ameroseiella apodius (Karg, 1971)
- Ameroseiella macrochelae Westerboer, 1963
- Ameroseiella stepposa Bregetova, 1977
