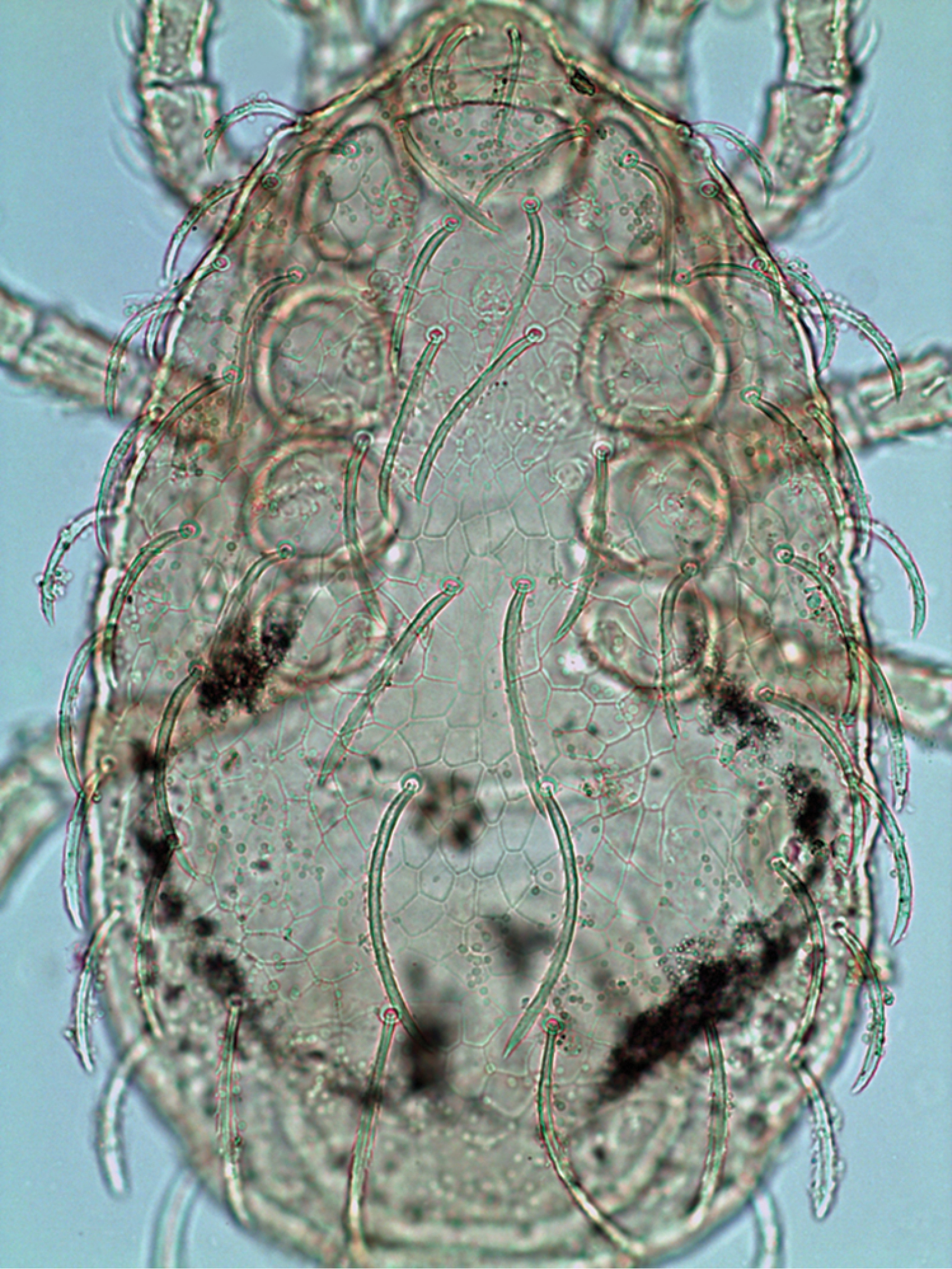
- Kleemannia delicata

Scientific classification
- Kingdom: Animalia
- Phylum: Arthropoda
- Subphylum: Chelicerata
- Class: Arachnida
- Order: Mesostigmata
- Family: Ameroseiidae
- Genus: Kleemannia; Oudemans, 1930

= Kleemannia =

Genus of mites

Kleemannia is a genus of mites in the family Ameroseiidae. There are more than 20 described species in Kleemannia.

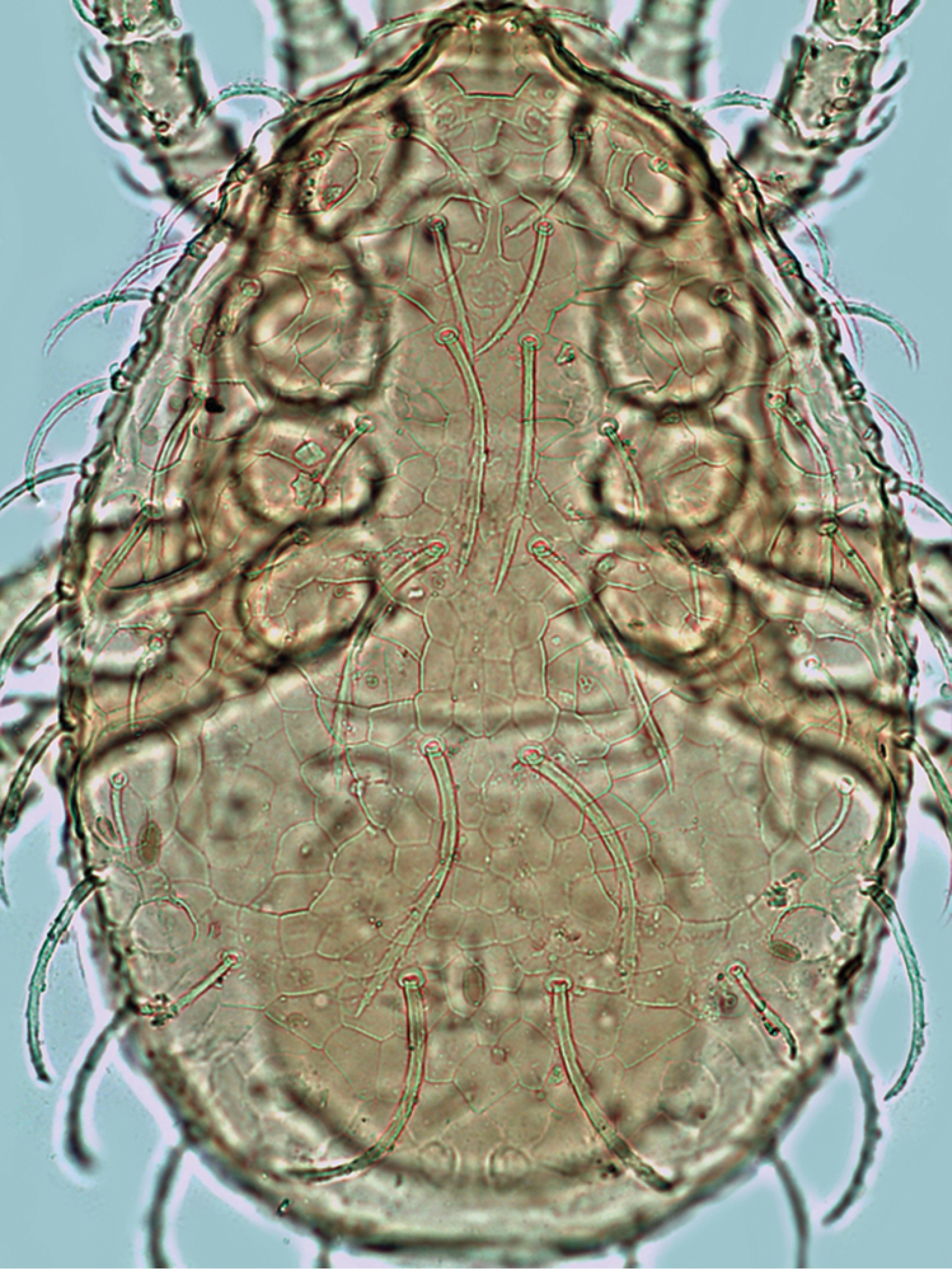
Kleemannia tenella

== Species ==
These 23 species belong to the genus Kleemannia:

- Kleemannia bella Barilo, 1987
- Kleemannia bengalensis Bhattacharyya, 1972
- Kleemannia bisetae Karg, 1994
- Kleemannia curvata Gu, Wang & Bai, 1989
- Kleemannia delicata Berlese, 1918
- Kleemannia dipankari Bhattacharyya, 2004
- Kleemannia elegans Bernhard, 1963
- Kleemannia guyimingi Ma, 1997
- Kleemannia insignis Bernhard, 1963
- Kleemannia kosi El-Badry, Nasr & Hafez, 1979
- Kleemannia longisetosa Ye & Ma, 1993
- Kleemannia mineiro Narita, Bernardi & Moraes, 2013
- Kleemannia multus Gu, Wang & Bai, 1989
- Kleemannia nova Nasr & Abou-Awad, 1986
- Kleemannia parplumosa Nasr & Abou-Awad, 1986
- Kleemannia pennata Fox, 1949
- Kleemannia pinicola Ishikawa, 1972
- Kleemannia plumea Oudemans, 1930
- Kleemannia plumosoides Gu, Wang & Bai, 1989
- Kleemannia plumosus (Oudemans, 1902)
- Kleemannia reticulata Kruger & Loots, 1980
- Kleemannia tenella Berlese, 1916
- Kleemannia wahabi Ibrahim & Abdel-Samed, 1992
