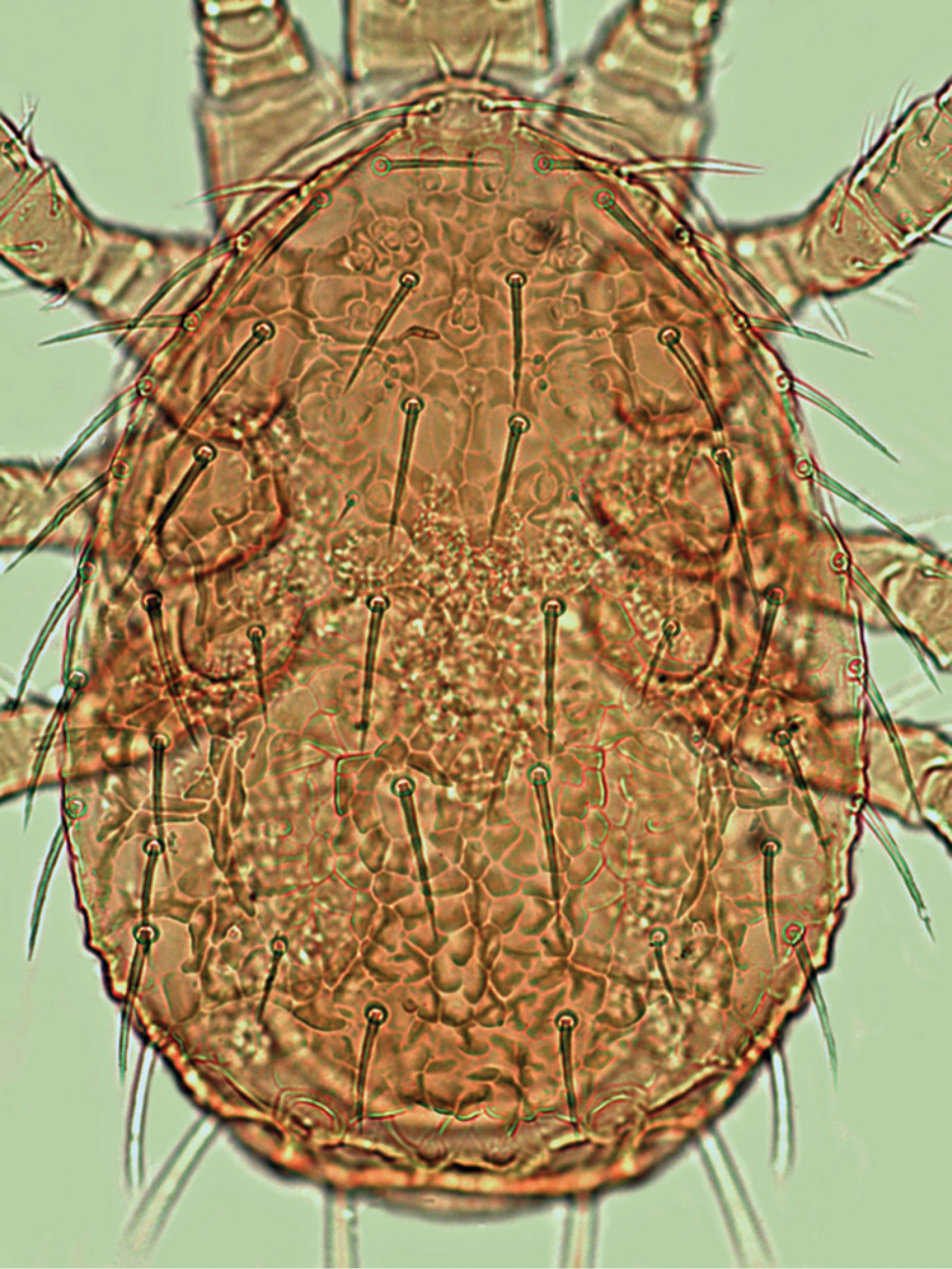
- Ameroseius callosus

Scientific classification
- Domain: Eukaryota
- Kingdom: Animalia
- Phylum: Arthropoda
- Subphylum: Chelicerata
- Class: Arachnida
- Order: Mesostigmata
- Family: Ameroseiidae
- Genus: Ameroseius; Berlese, 1904

= Ameroseius =

Genus of mites

Ameroseius is a genus of mites in the family Ameroseiidae. There are more than 60 described species in Ameroseius.

== Species ==
These 69 species belong to the genus Ameroseius:

- Ameroseius aegypticus El-Badry, Nasr & Hafez, 1979
- Ameroseius asper Karg, 1994
- Ameroseius avium Karg, 1976
- Ameroseius bembix Elsen, 1973
- Ameroseius benoiti Elsen, 1973
- Ameroseius bisetae Karg, 1994
- Ameroseius californicus Garman & McGregor, 1956
- Ameroseius callosus Masan, 1998
- Ameroseius cavernosus Westerboer, 1963
- Ameroseius corbiculus (Sowerby, 1806)
- Ameroseius corniculus Karg, 1971
- Ameroseius coronarius De Leon, 1964
- Ameroseius crassipes Berlese, 1910
- Ameroseius cuiqishengi Ma, 1995
- Ameroseius decemsetosus Micherdzinski, 1965
- Ameroseius delicatus Berlese, 1918
- Ameroseius dendrovagans Flechtmann & Flechtmann, 1985
- Ameroseius denticulatus Gu & Guo, 1997
- Ameroseius dipankari Bhattacharyya, 2004
- Ameroseius elegans Bernhard, 1963
- Ameroseius elegantissimus Ishikawa, 1984
- Ameroseius favosus Berlese, 1910
- Ameroseius flagellatus Berlese, 1910
- Ameroseius fungicola Masan, 1998
- Ameroseius furcatus Karg, 1971
- Ameroseius gabonensis Elsen, 1973
- Ameroseius georgei Turk, 1943
- Ameroseius gillardinae Elsen, 1973
- Ameroseius gracilis Halbert, 1923
- Ameroseius halongicus Haitlinger, 1987
- Ameroseius haplocosmus Elsen, 1973
- Ameroseius imbellicus Karg, 1976
- Ameroseius imitocorbiculus Ma & Lin, 2013
- Ameroseius insignis Bernhard, 1963
- Ameroseius jacobsoni Berlese, 1910
- Ameroseius laelaptoides Berlese, 1904
- Ameroseius latofolius Karg & Schorlemmer, 2009
- Ameroseius leclercqi Elsen, 1973
- Ameroseius lehtineni Huhta & Karg, 2010
- Ameroseius lidiae Bregetova, 1977
- Ameroseius longitarsis Elsen, 1973
- Ameroseius longitrichus W.Hirschmann, 1963
- Ameroseius macrochelae Westerboer, 1963
- Ameroseius macropilis De Leon, 1964
- Ameroseius magnisetosa Ishikawa, 1972
- Ameroseius mariehigginsae De Leon, 1964
- Ameroseius matsudai Ishikawa, 1977
- Ameroseius megatritosternum Elsen, 1973
- Ameroseius mirus Elsen, 1973
- Ameroseius octobrevisetae Elsen, 1973
- Ameroseius peniophorae De Leon, 1964
- Ameroseius pinicola Ishikawa, 1972
- Ameroseius plumea Oudemans, 1930
- Ameroseius proteae Ryke, 1964
- Ameroseius pulcher Westerboer, 1963
- Ameroseius renatae Mašán, 2017
- Ameroseius reticulatus Berlese, 1905
- Ameroseius sculptilis Berlese, 1916
- Ameroseius sextuberculi Karg, 1996
- Ameroseius stepposa Bregetova, 1977
- Ameroseius sternalis Bhattacharyya & Kheto, 2015
- Ameroseius stultus Karg, 1996
- Ameroseius submagnisetosus Ma & Lin, 2005
- Ameroseius taoerhensis Ma, 1995
- Ameroseius tenellus Berlese, 1916
- Ameroseius ulmi Hirschmann, 1963
- Ameroseius variolarius Ishikawa, 1972
- Ameroseius vietnamensis Micherdzinski, 1965
- Ameroseius womersleyi Berlese, 1904
