= Brontispalaelaps =

Scientific classification
- Domain: Eukaryota
- Kingdom: Animalia
- Phylum: Arthropoda
- Subphylum: Chelicerata
- Class: Arachnida
- Order: Mesostigmata
- Family: Ameroseiidae
- Genus: Brontispalaelaps; Womersley, 1956

Genus of mites

Brontispalaelaps is a genus of mites in the family Ameroseiidae. There are at least two described species in Brontispalaelaps.

== Species ==
These two species belong to the genus Brontispalaelaps:

- Brontispalaelaps leveri Womersley, 1956
- Brontispalaelaps marianneae Halliday, 1997
