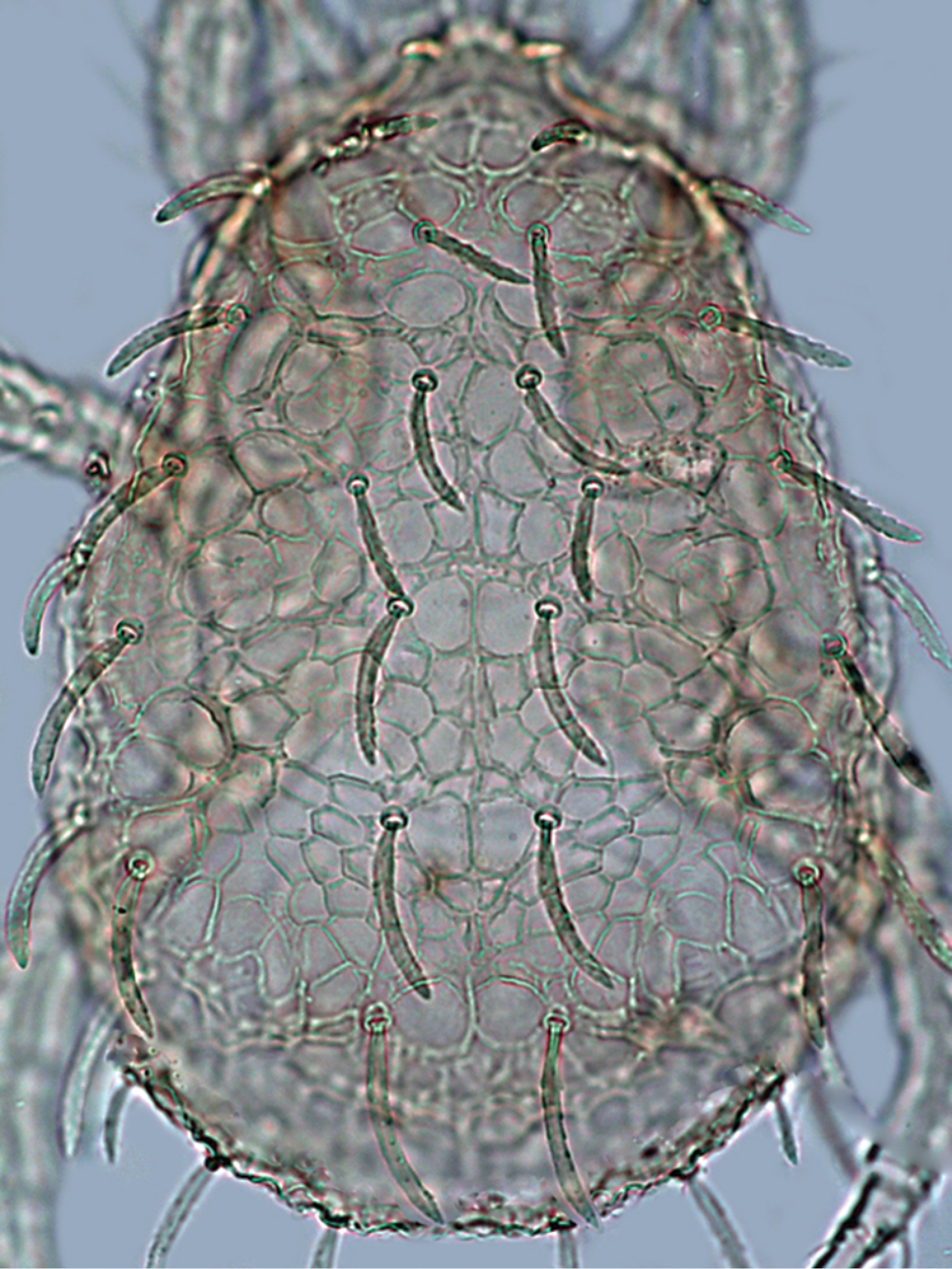
- Pseudoameroseius michaelangeli

Scientific classification
- Kingdom: Animalia
- Phylum: Arthropoda
- Subphylum: Chelicerata
- Class: Arachnida
- Order: Mesostigmata
- Family: Ameroseiidae
- Genus: Pseudoameroseius; Mašán 2017
- Species: P. michaelangeli

Binomial name
- Pseudoameroseius michaelangeli (Moraza, 2006)

= Pseudoameroseius =

Genus of mites

Pseudoameroseius is a genus of mites in the family Ameroseiidae. This genus has a single species, Pseudoameroseius michaelangeli.
