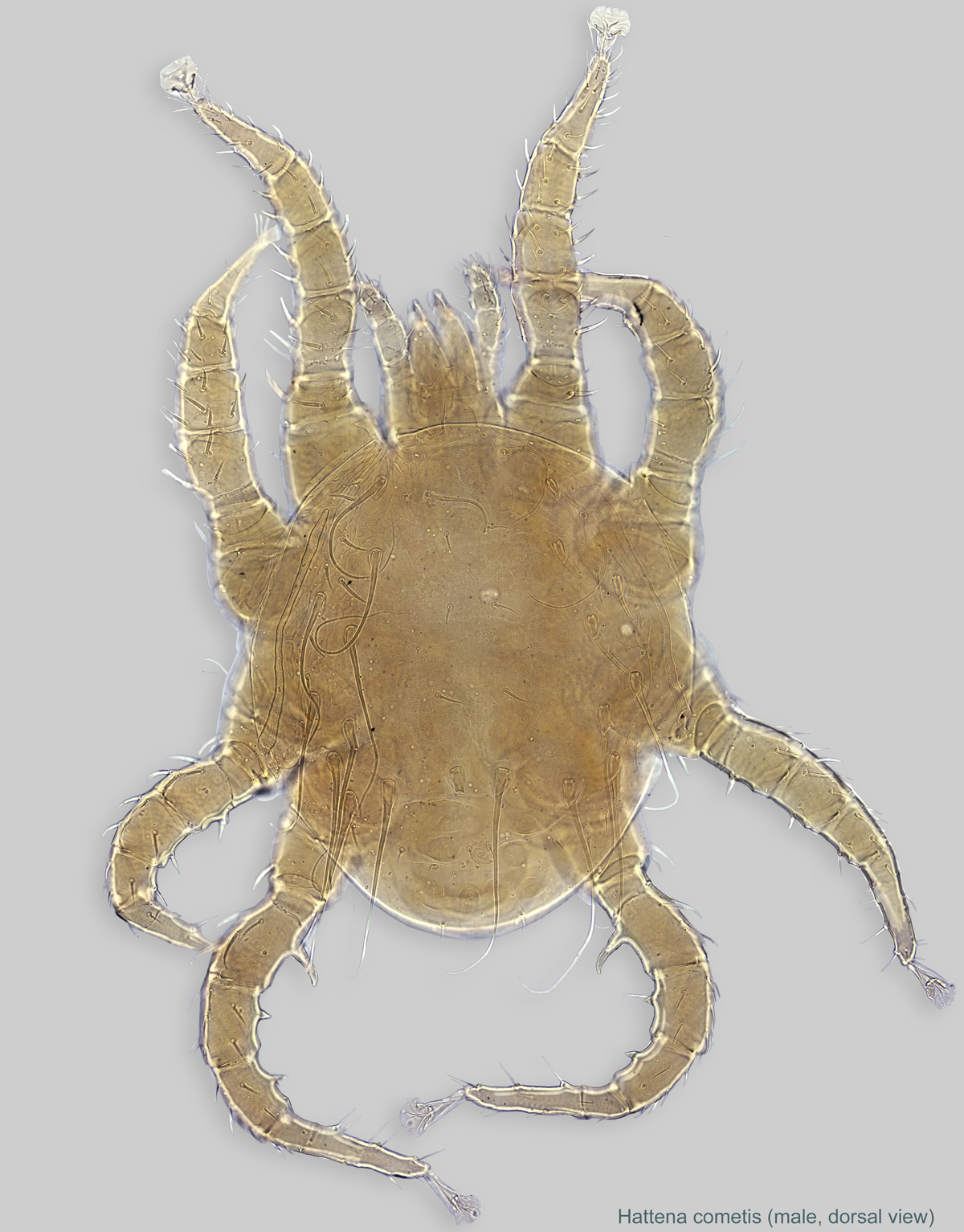
- Hattena cometis

Scientific classification
- Domain: Eukaryota
- Kingdom: Animalia
- Phylum: Arthropoda
- Subphylum: Chelicerata
- Class: Arachnida
- Order: Mesostigmata
- Family: Ameroseiidae
- Genus: Hattena; Domrow, 1963

= Hattena =

Genus of mites

Hattena is a genus of mites in the family Ameroseiidae. There are about 10 described species in Hattena.

== Species ==
These 10 species belong to the genus Hattena:

- Hattena clemmys Domrow, 1981
- Hattena cometis Domrow, 1979
- Hattena dalyi Elsen, 1974
- Hattena erosa Domrow, 1963
- Hattena floricola Halliday, 1997
- Hattena incisa Halliday, 1997
- Hattena panopla Domrow, 1966
- Hattena rhizophorae Faraji & Cornejo, 2006
- Hattena senaria Allred, 1970
- Hattena tongana (Manson, 1974)
