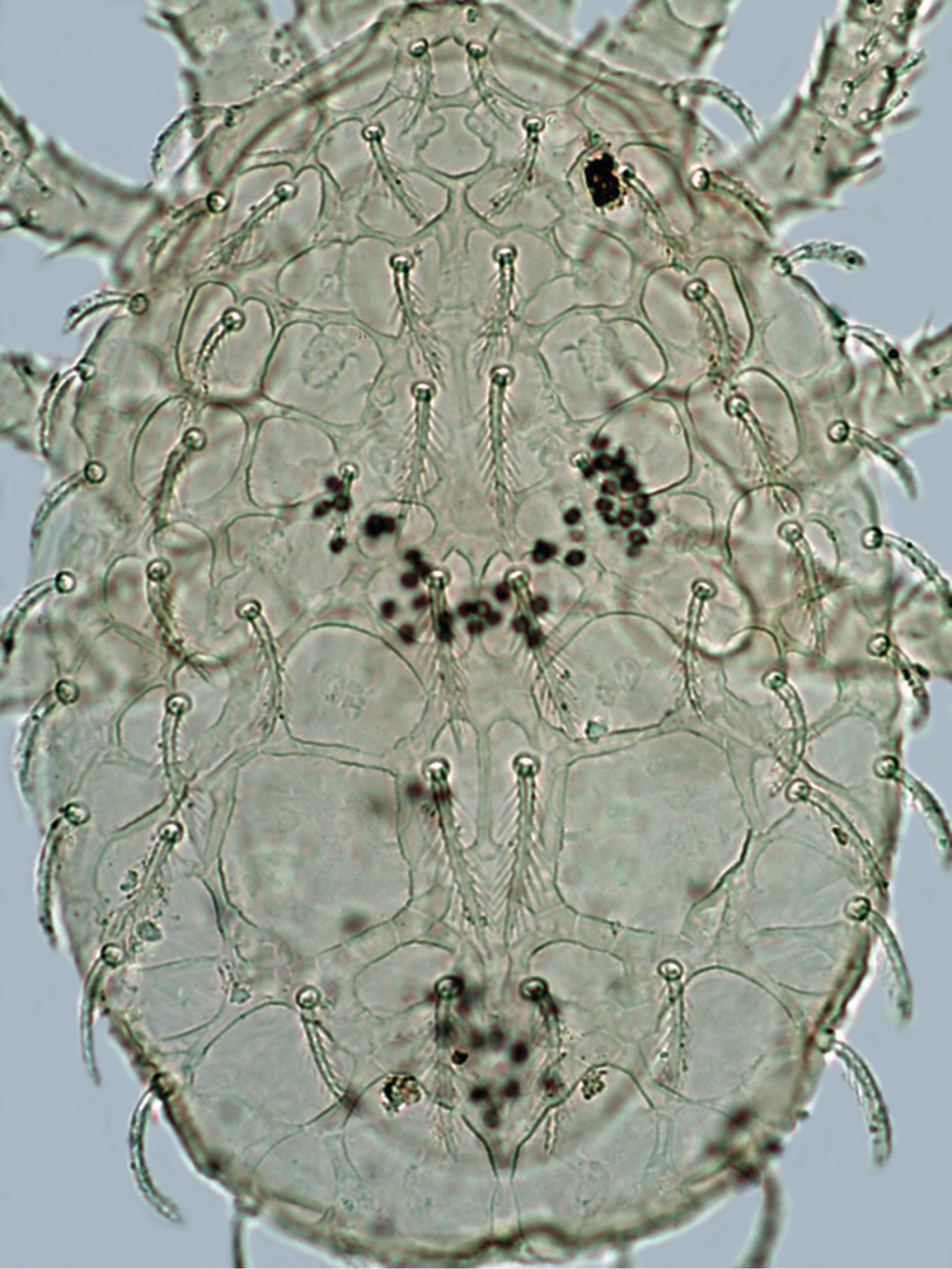
- Sinoseius lobatus

Scientific classification
- Domain: Eukaryota
- Kingdom: Animalia
- Phylum: Arthropoda
- Subphylum: Chelicerata
- Class: Arachnida
- Order: Mesostigmata
- Family: Ameroseiidae
- Genus: Sinoseius; Bai & Gu, 1995

= Sinoseius =

Genus of mites

Sinoseius is a genus of mites in the family Ameroseiidae. There are at least two described species in Sinoseius.

== Species ==
These two species belong to the genus Sinoseius:

- Sinoseius fossatus Barilo, 1986
- Sinoseius lobatus Bai, Gu & Fang, 1995, syn. Sinoseius pinnatus Huhta & Karg, 2010
