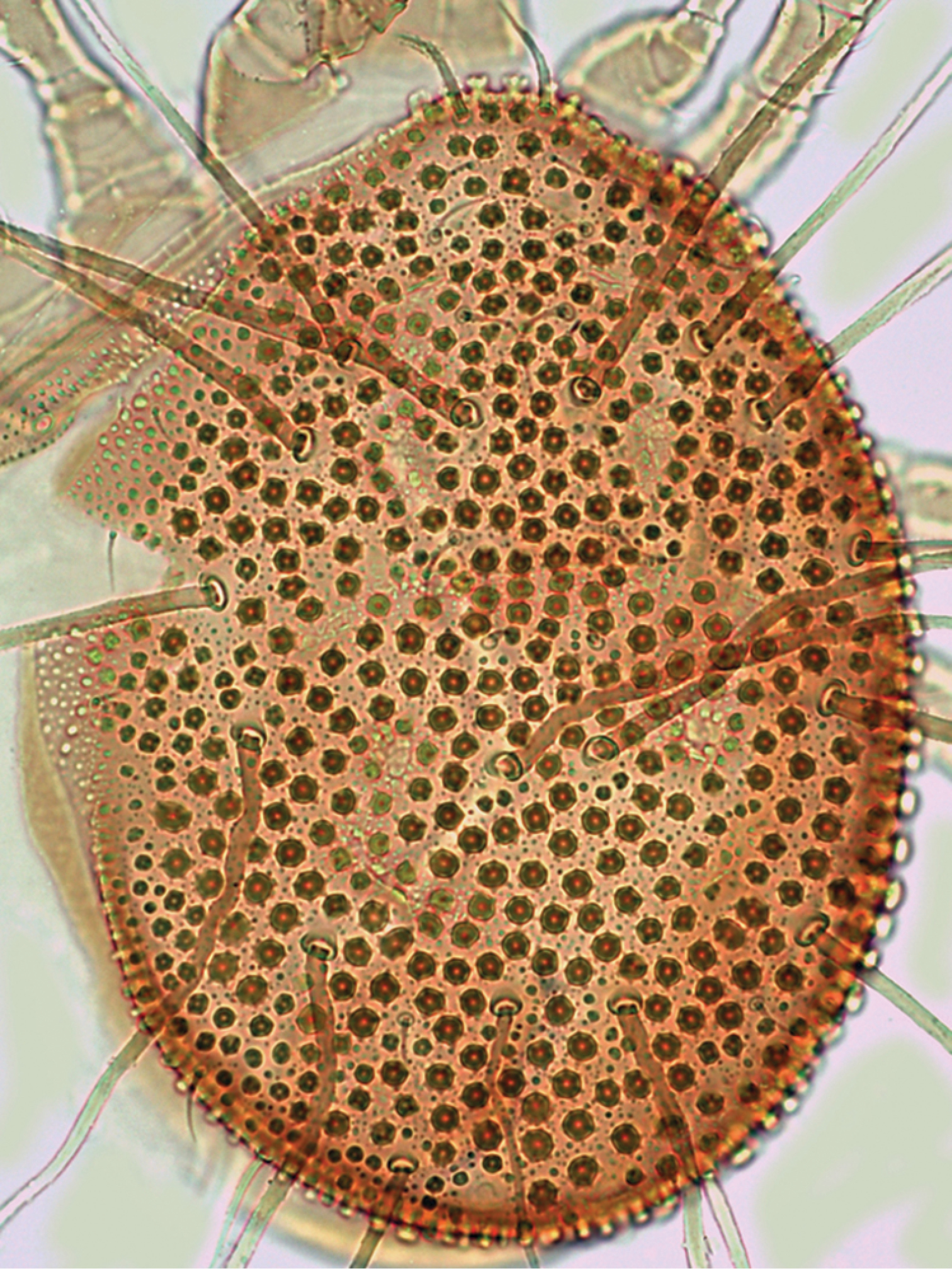
- Epicriopsis hungaricus

Scientific classification
- Kingdom: Animalia
- Phylum: Arthropoda
- Subphylum: Chelicerata
- Class: Arachnida
- Order: Mesostigmata
- Family: Ameroseiidae
- Genus: Epicriopsis; Berlese, 1916

= Epicriopsis =

Genus of mites

Epicriopsis is a genus of mites in the family Ameroseiidae. There are about 10 described species in Epicriopsis.

== Species ==
These 10 species belong to the genus Epicriopsis:

- Epicriopsis atuberculata Narita & Moraes, 2016
- Epicriopsis horrida (Kramer, 1876)
- Epicriopsis hungarica Kandil, 1978
- Epicriopsis jilinensis Ma, 2002
- Epicriopsis linzhiensis Ma & Lin, 2016
- Epicriopsis mirabilis Wilmann, 1956
- Epicriopsis palustris Karg, 1971
- Epicriopsis stellata Ishikawa, 1972
- Epicriopsis suedus Karg, 1971
- Epicriopsis walteri Halliday, 1997
