= Afrocypholaelaps =

Scientific classification
- Kingdom: Animalia
- Phylum: Arthropoda
- Subphylum: Chelicerata
- Class: Arachnida
- Order: Mesostigmata
- Family: Ameroseiidae
- Genus: Afrocypholaelaps; Elsen, 1972
- Species: A. africanus

Binomial name
- Afrocypholaelaps africanus Evans, 1963

Genus of mites

Afrocypholaelaps is a genus of mites in the family Ameroseiidae. This genus currently has a single species, Afrocypholaelaps africanus.
