= Ameroseiidae =

Scientific classification
- Kingdom: Animalia
- Phylum: Arthropoda
- Subphylum: Chelicerata
- Class: Arachnida
- Order: Mesostigmata
- Superfamily: Ascoidea
- Family: Ameroseiidae; Evans, 1961

Family of mites

The family Ameroseiidae is one of the three families of mites under the superfamily Ascoidea. There are about 12 genera and more than 130 described species in Ameroseiidae. The family has a worldwide distribution.

== Description ==
Ameroseiidae can be recognised by: a well-sclerotised and often strongly ornamented dorsal shield; usually 27-30 pairs of setae on the dorsal shield and setae J5 always absent; the sternal shield often reduced to 2 pairs of setae with st3 on shield or on platelets; the corniculi often toothed; the chelicerae sometimes with a membranous lobe; and the tectum usually simple, smoothly (rarely toothed) triangular or weakly to strongly mucronate.

Leg chaetotaxy - the arrangements of setae on the legs - varies among species and genera, making this feature useful for classification.

== Ecology ==
Ameroseiids occur in many habitats including forest litter, garden mulch, dead wood and associated fungi, flowers, animal nests, tree hollows, humid soils and various anthropogenic structures (e.g. houses, offices, farms, granaries). Unlike most mesostigmatans, they typically feed on non-animal foods such as fungi. Some species feed on pollen and nectar, and these are the ones associated with flowers and flower-feeding animals.

One study looking at the ameroseiids of Slovakia (27 species total) found that eight species were edaphic (associated with soils, usually wet soils), another eight species were saproxylic (in dead wood and associated fungi), two species were saprophilous (in dunghills, excrements and compost heaps), eight species were aerial (spread around by air currents, allowing them to colonise ephemeral and scattered habitats), and one species was insecticolous (associated with insects, in this case European honey bee).

Some species of Ameroseiidae are phoretic on insects or other animals, riding these to disperse to new habitats. Others are non-phoretic and disperse using air currents, as noted above.

== Genera ==
These 12 genera belong to the family Ameroseiidae:

- Afrocypholaelaps Elsen, 1972
- Ameroseiella Bregetova, 1977
- Ameroseius Berlese, 1904
- Asperolaelaps Womersley, 1956
- Brontispalaelaps Womersley, 1956
- Epicriopsis Berlese, 1916
- Hattena Domrow, 1963
- Kleemannia Oudemans, 1930
- Neocypholaelaps Vitzthum, 1942
- Pseudoameroseius Mašán 2017
- Sertitympanum Elsen & Whitaker, 1985
- Sinoseius Bai & Gu, 1995
