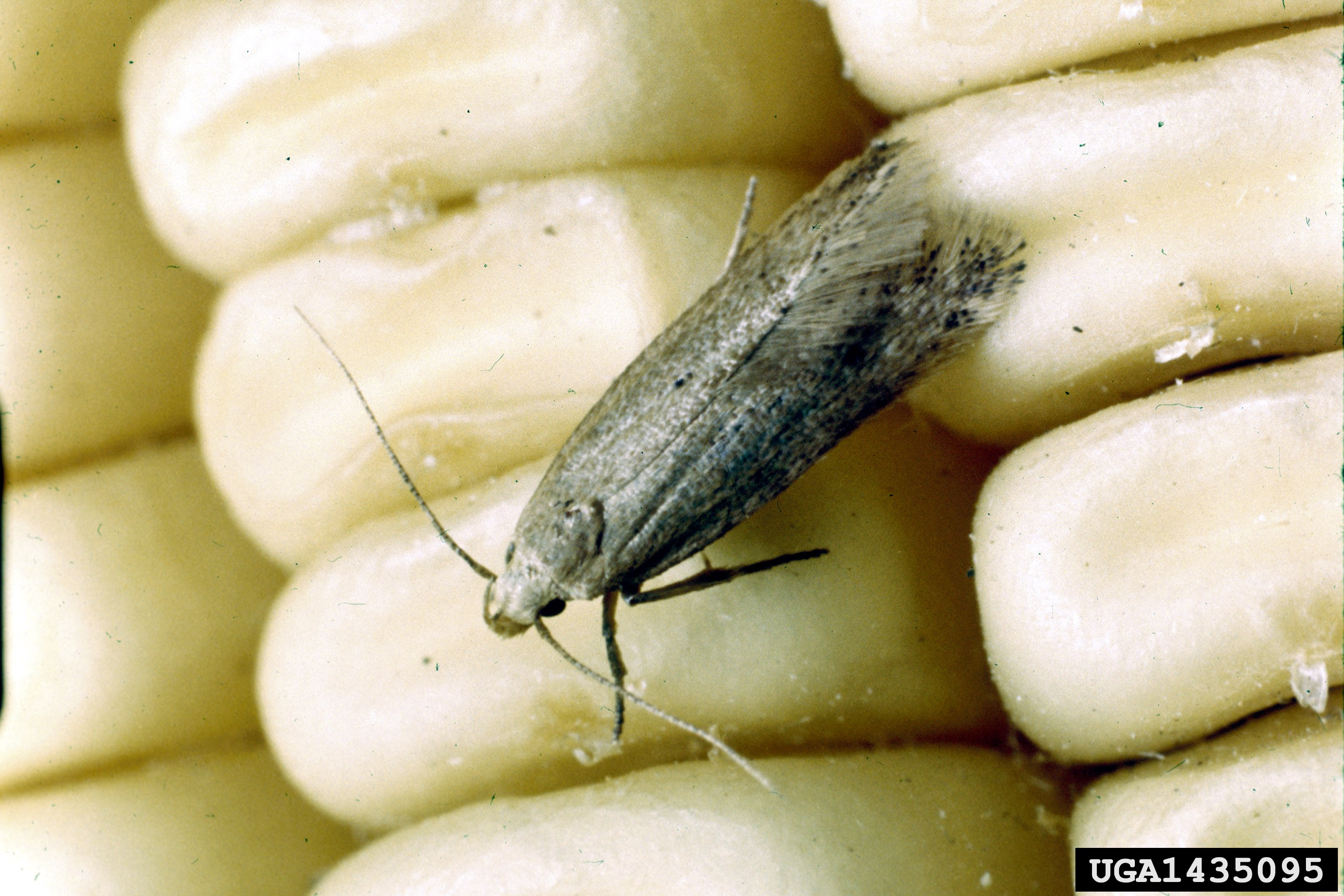
- Adult on a maize ear

Scientific classification
- Kingdom: Animalia
- Phylum: Arthropoda
- Clade: Pancrustacea
- Class: Insecta
- Order: Lepidoptera
- Family: Gelechiidae
- Genus: Sitotroga
- Species: S. cerealella

Binomial name
- Sitotroga cerealella (Olivier, 1789)

Synonyms
- Numerous, see text

= Angoumois grain moth =

Species of moth

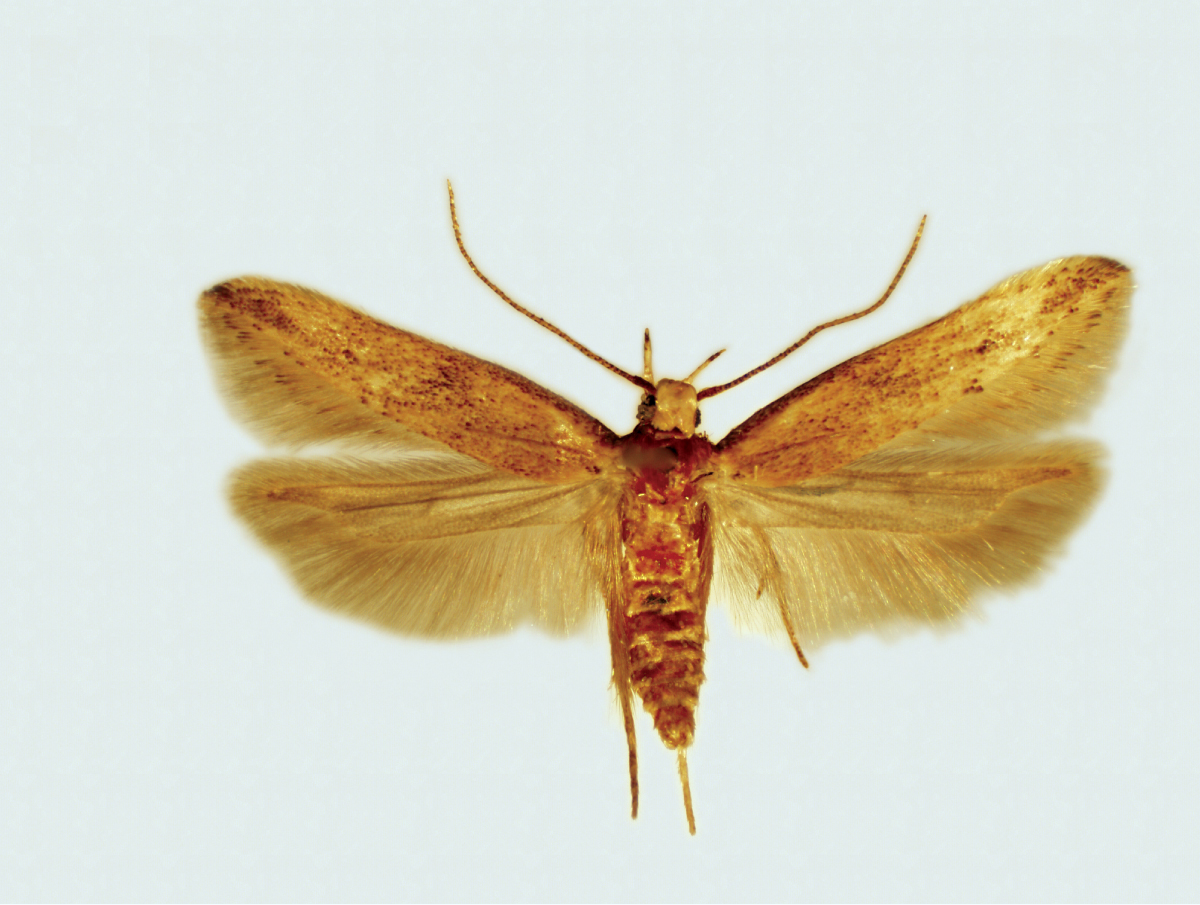
A specimen collected by CSIRO

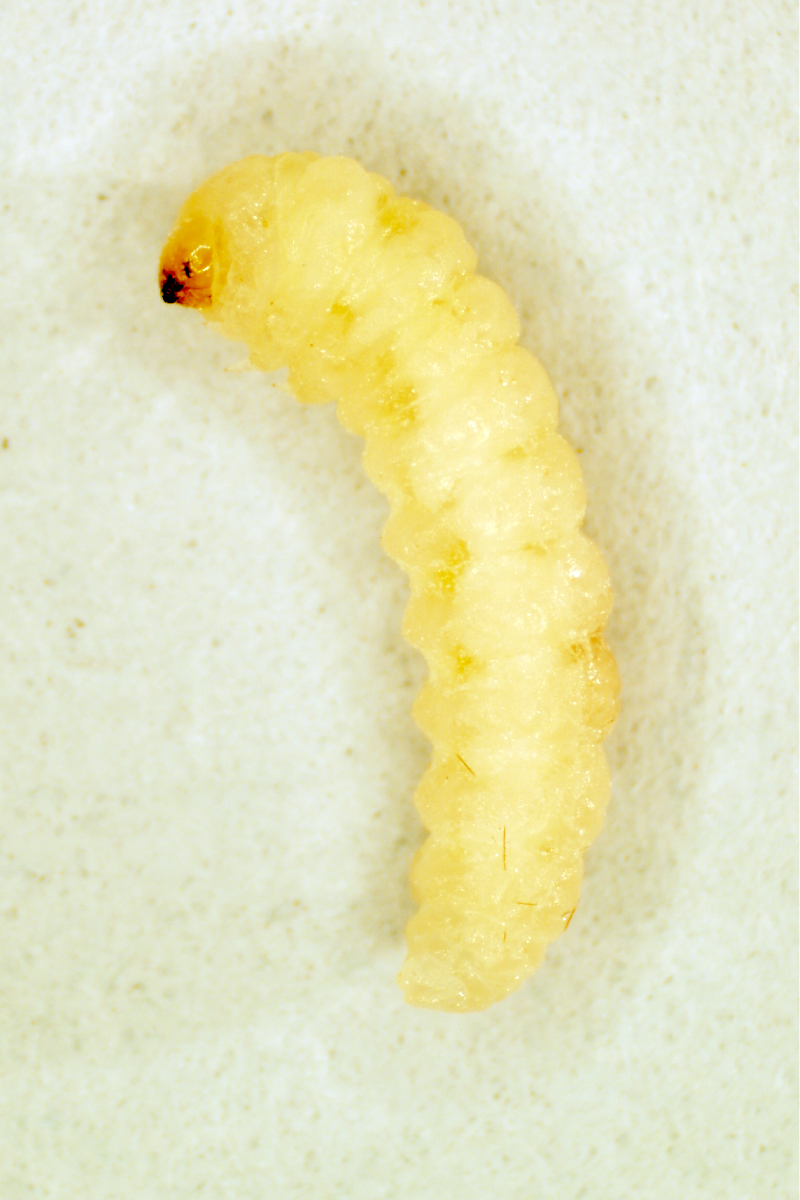
An Angoumois grain moth larva

The Angoumois grain moth (Sitotroga cerealella) is a species of the Gelechiidae moth family, commonly referred to as the "rice grain moth". It is most abundant in the temperate or tropical climates of India, China, South Africa, Indonesia, Malaysia, Japan, Egypt and Nigeria, with its location of origin being currently unknown. It is most commonly associated as a pest of field and stored cereal grains as they burrow within the kernel grains of crop plants, rendering them unusable for human consumption. By laying eggs between the grains themselves and hatching at a later time, often during the processing, transportation or storage stages, the moth can be transported to households or countries presently free of Angoumois grain moth infestations. Thus, constant protection against the Angoumois grain moth is required for grain up till the time of consumption.

== Naming ==
Its common name refers to Angoumois, the pre-revolutionary province of France from which it was first scientifically described by G.-A. Olivier in 1789. The province was transformed into the present-day Charente département the following year. This species first came under scientific scrutiny in 1760 when Mr Pajot de Marcheval, Intendant of the Généralité of Limoges, which included the Angoumois, exposed to the French court the devastations on the stores of wheat caused by an unknown and relatively new insect in the Angoumois. The French Royal Academy of Sciences appointed Henri-Louis Duhamel du Monceau and Mathieu Tillet to investigate this matter, whom published an extensive report on their findings in 1762, and thus associating this species' name with the French Angoumois province, despite the fact that their findings revealed that this species was obviously not native to this region.

== Description ==
The ovoid eggs are initially white when laid, but soon turn towards a shade of red and measure approximately 2 millimetres (3/32 in) long. Though rarely seen due to their growth stages taking place within a single grain, larvae of the Angoumois grain moth are yellowish-white with a small yellowish-brown head and 10–15 millimetres (3/8–9/16 in) in length. The average lifespan of the adult Angoumois grain moth is 15 days, with a maximum of 30 days if living under the optimal temperature. Adult Angoumois grain moths have a wingspan from 10–15 millimetres (13/32–19/32 in) and a body length of 5–10 millimetres (3/16–13/32 in). Like most moths, they have 4 wings, 6 legs and are brownish-grey, or pale brown in colour. They exhibit dark spots on their tapering forewings, about two-thirds from the base of their wings. Their uniquely curved hind wings give them a distinguishing characteristic from other moths, with hairs along the edge of the wings. The forewings are golden-yellow, with their light grey hind wings giving the whole moth an overall brown colour. Adult males are differentiated by a black thin and pointed abdomen whereas adult females express a colourless bulky and long abdomen.

== Distribution and habitat ==
The Angoumois grain moth spread around the world with trade and it is now a cosmopolitan species. It is known to occur throughout Africa, Central and South America, Southeast and southern USA, the southern half of Eurasia (primarily below the 38th parallel north), Australia and New Zealand. The Angoumois grain moth is mostly found in warmer climates, but small populations have been documented in colder climates, such as Russia. There has been several recordings of its presence in imported products in the United Kingdom, but the moth has not established itself there. The optimal temperature at which it can survive is around 30 °C (86 °F), with a relatively high humidity of around 75% providing optimal conditions for hatching. Generally, the moth's habitat is predominantly situated within areas of agricultural development and agroecosystems.

== Behaviour and ecology ==
=== Behaviour ===
The Angoumois grain moth's behavioural adaptations include the depositing of eggs on or close to a grain source, which the larvae then use as a food source as well as for protection. The adult moths, like all moth species, have an attraction to light (positive phototaxis) for competing reasons that are continuing to be debated. The moth in its larval stage creates an entrance hole within a grain, covering it after entry. After the process of pupation, an adult exit hole is created, from which it then emerges. These moths are typically known to be more active at low temperatures resulting in increased feeding activity in the winter months. Though typically a single larva will develop and feed on a single grain, cereal plants that produce kernel grains with high nutrient availability such as corn can provide for as many as three larvae. The moth can survive in both damaged grains and smaller grains such as millet, however, it has a preference for larger, nutrient-rich grains. Larvae burrow into the germ area of the grain where the thick bran acts as protection against predators whilst the germ itself provides a nutrient abundant food source. Larvae also exhibit the behaviour of producing silky tunnels between kernels in the storage of grains that have no external barrier, allowing for the larvae to travel freely between its food sources.

=== Diet ===
The larvae and adults of the Angoumois grain moth feed on the seeds and kernels of cereal crops: most commonly wheat, barley, sorghum, rice, rye, triticale and maize. The standard diet requirements for the larvae consists of corn starch, glycerol, casein, yeast, and wheat germ found within the reproductive products of cereal crops. The adults, however, do not feed themselves and instead just reproduce, meaning it is only the larva that actually deal damage directly. More unusually, the caterpillars have been recorded to eat other dry plant matter, such as plant specimens stored in herbaria.

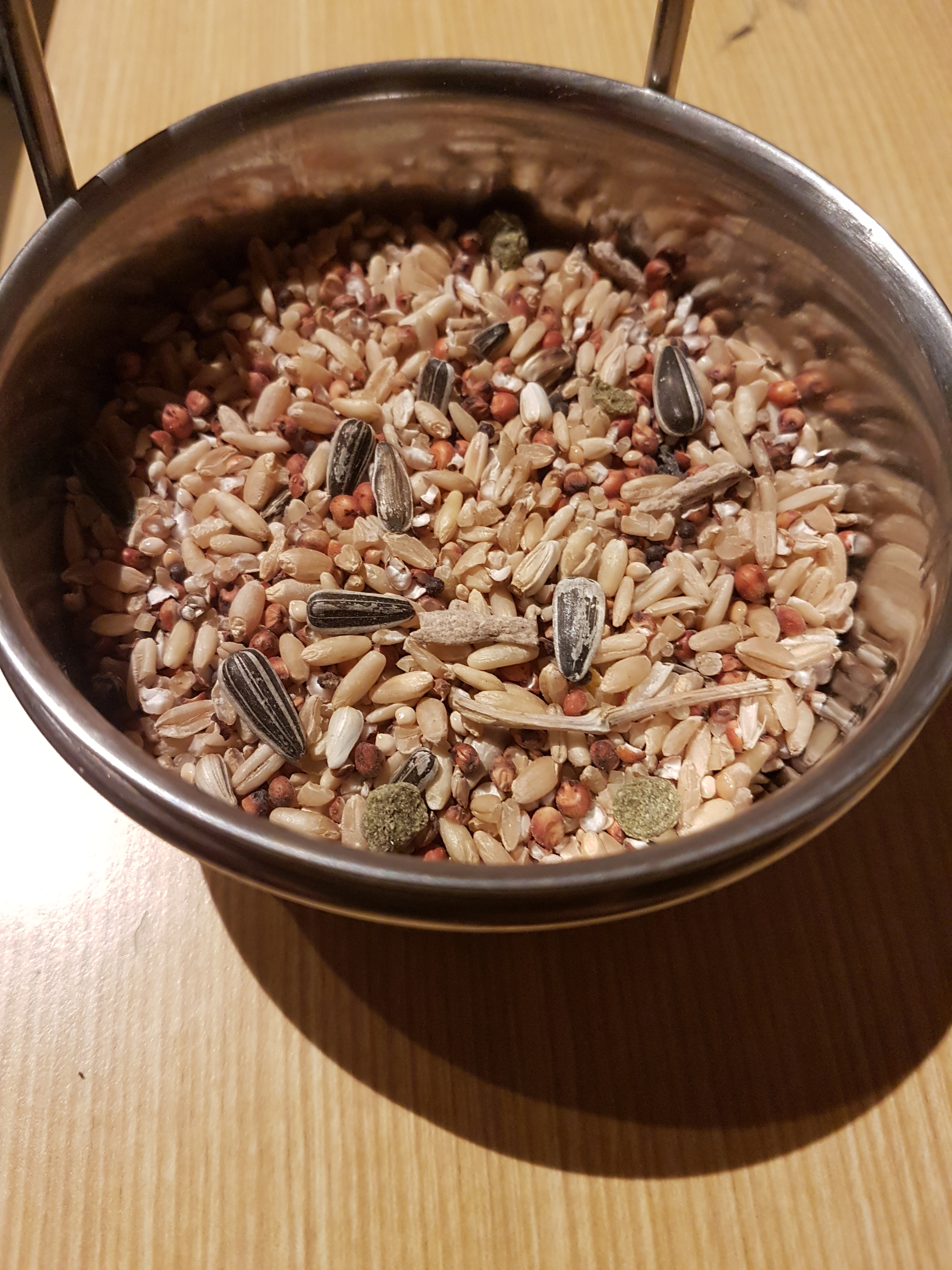
A bowl of bird seeds that can vector Angoumois grain moth

=== Life cycle and reproduction ===
The life cycle of the Angoumois grain moth begins from an egg, hatching into burrowing larvae that feed on the cereal grain or seed. Pupation then occurs, where the larva is sheltered in a silk cocoon within a grain and after 10 days or as little as 5 days, emerges as an Adult moth. Time elapsed for the life cycle from egg to adult is 35-40 days under optimal conditions. The female moths lay on average 40 eggs either grouped or singular in one incubation cycle, with a potential egg-laying capacity of before the end of the female's life cycle. Egg incubation, rate of survival and fertility of the Angoumois grain moth is highly dependent on climatic conditions, chiefly temperature, and humidity.

=== Environmental role ===
The natural threats to the Angoumois grain moth are pathogens, parasites, and predators of which there are a plethora of species, including birds, bats and insects. Each of these has varying degrees of impact against the moth and are instrumental in the population control of the species. The Angoumois grain moth, despite being considered a pest, acts as a food source within ecosystems for the bird, bat and insect populations. The natural predators of the moth's eggs and larvae are almost exclusively parasites and pathogens, most notably Pteromalus cerealellae and Blattisocius tarsalis which consume the eggs, while the Bacillus thuringiensis bacterium is a prominent example of a pathogen that naturally occurs in the environment and kills the moth in its larval stage. The majority of predators that feed on the Angoumois grain moth feed on the moth in its adult stage but do not do so during its other stages of life, with the exception of Blattisocius tarsalis which consumes the eggs. When present in the same environment, other insects such as Rhyzopertha dominica and Tribolium castaneum, the population of the moth decreases as opposed to when the moth is the dominant species. This phenomenon is the result of interspecific competition the moth can encounter in the environment and suggests that the moth does not have the ability to outcompete other pest insects. The Angoumois grain moth indirectly provides a food source to some insects by producing broken grains left after pupation and emergence of adult moths which are then consumed by those species.

== Relationship with humans ==
=== As pests ===
The impacts to the grain by the moth in its larval stage produces physical damage to the grain, loss of nutritional value, and the inability for the infested seeds to germinate. The discolouration and unpleasant odour of grains is symptomatic of Angoumois grain moth infestation, however there are no noticeable indications until just prior to the pupation stage, when a translucent window can be seen on the grain, caused by the larva borrowing a small chamber within it. The moth infestation of crops with multiple applications like maize can also damage the availability of other products such as textiles, plastics, dyes and adhesives. Grains that are bored into by the moth larvae can no longer germinate. The impact of untreated infestations can be a major threat to agricultural production. For example, some agricultural zones of China were calculated to have lost as much as 40% of their wheat and rice yields due to Angoumois grain moth infestations. Angoumois grain moth is synanthropic, tending not to migrate individually and are predominantly introduced to a new environment from larvae previously placed within the grain before storage. Moths found inside private homes are usually the Indianmeal moth and are rarely the Angoumois grain moth. However, home infestations can occur and can result from the development of eggs or larvae within household products such as flour or pet food such as birdseed.

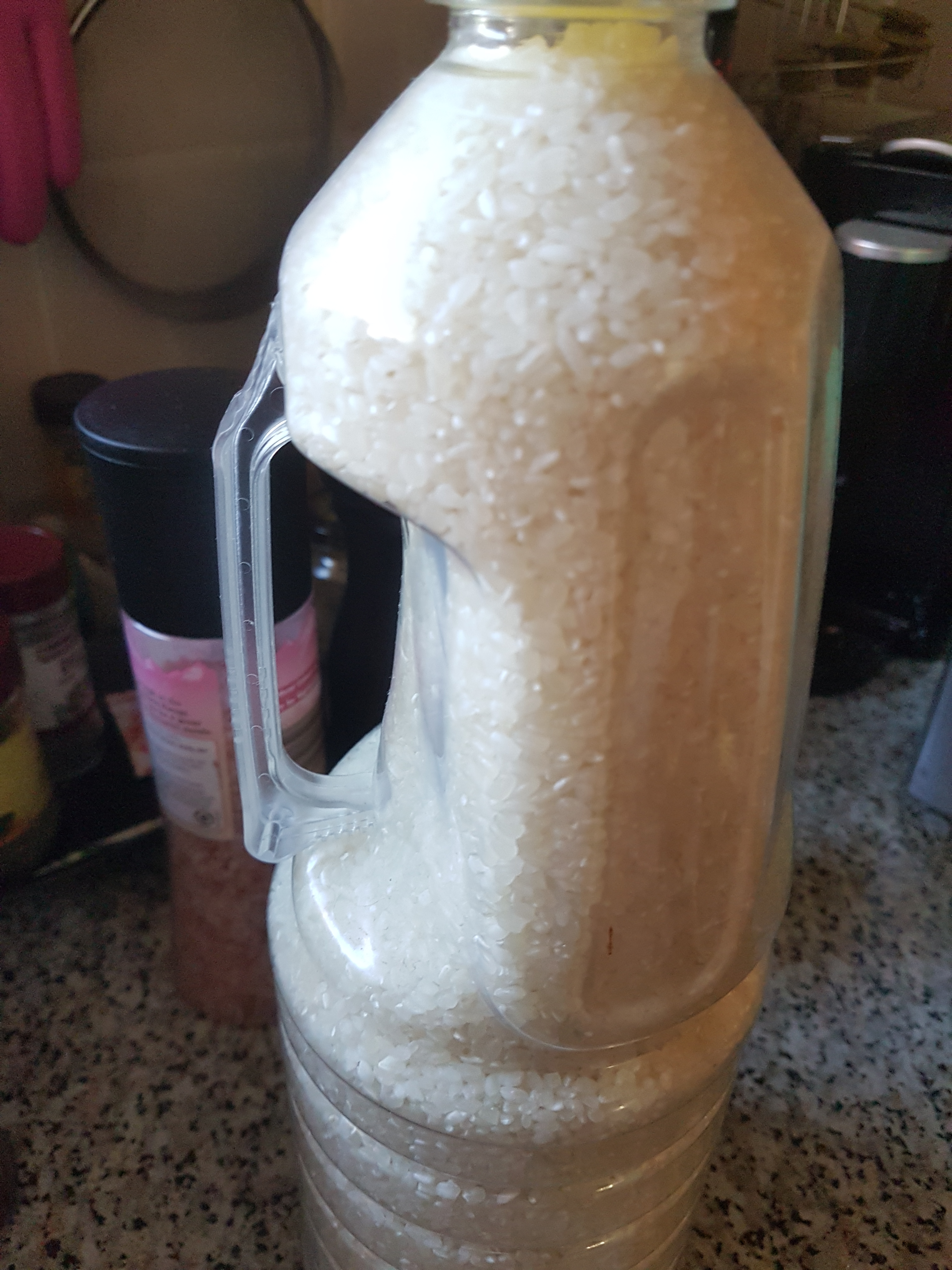
Household stored short-grain rice that can vector Angoumois grain moth

=== Control ===
The use of Integrated pest management strategies is the integration of various strategies that are often used to prevent or remove infestations of pest species from the agroecosystems. Strategies for combating infestation of the Angoumois grain moth differ widely in efficacy and utility based on regional regulations, wealth and access to specific chemicals or equipment. The cleaning of equipment, removal of crop stubble, destruction of infested grain and the correct storage of grain in aerated low moisture environments will reduce the likelihood of future infestations. The application of chemical amendments to cereal crops for the prevention of infestation continues to be widely used. The use of fumigation (eg: Phosphine) followed by insecticides (eg: methacrifos) on maize has shown to be very effective in the elimination of moth infestation. However, the emergence of natural immunity with the over-application of insecticides has been reported to occur, with some populations of the Angoumois grain moth becoming resistant to certain chemicals. The use of pesticides must also be timed based on the harvest season, where the chemical application must be appropriately distant from the harvest to avoid chemical contamination of the produce. Insecticide application can produce harmful sublethal effects on the moth species, most notably the reduction in its ability to produce new healthy offspring. Over time this may result in a reduction in the moth's fertility and population. The use of insecticides may, however, incur biomagnification in the natural predators of the Angoumois grain moth such as birds, which can produce sub-lethal or lethal effects on these species. Natural amendments to cereal crops are used to avoid the dangers of chemical use and the expenses associated with its use. Biogas from cattle manure and dried sage leaves on cereal crops are both used as natural measures to combat the Angoumois grain moth.

The use of genetically modified organisms is a method of preventing Angoumois grain moth infestation by providing a genetically added resistance to infestation. An example of a moth resistant crop is BT Corn (Bacillus thuringiensis), where the corn naturally produces the larvicidal toxin present in Bacillus thuringiensis, eliminating the need for natural or chemical measures. Though GMO application has been successfully augmenting yields globally, concerns exist regarding the possible toxin effects on non-target species in the ecosystem. Moreover, GMOs lack of genetic variation, increasing vulnerability to disease. The introduction of parasites, pathogens or natural predators of the moth is a biological method that will reduce the abundance of moths. Physical barriers such as netting covers may reduce the potential for future infestations.

== Synonyms ==
Junior synonyms of the Angoumois grain moth are:

- Alucita cerealella Olivier, 1789
- Anacampsis cerealella (Olivier, 1789)
- Aristotelia ochrescens Meyrick in Caradja & Meyrick, 1938
- Butalis cerealella (Olivier, 1789)
- Epithectis palearis Meyrick, 1913
- Gelechia arctella Walker, 1864
- Gelechia cerealella (Olivier, 1789)
- Gelechia (Sitotroga?) coarctatella Zeller, 1877
- Gelechia melanarthra Lower, 1900
- Œcophora granella Latreille, 1829
- Syngenomictis aenictopa Meyrick, 1927
- Tinea hordei Kirby & Spence, 1815
- Ypsolophus granellus Kirby-Spence
