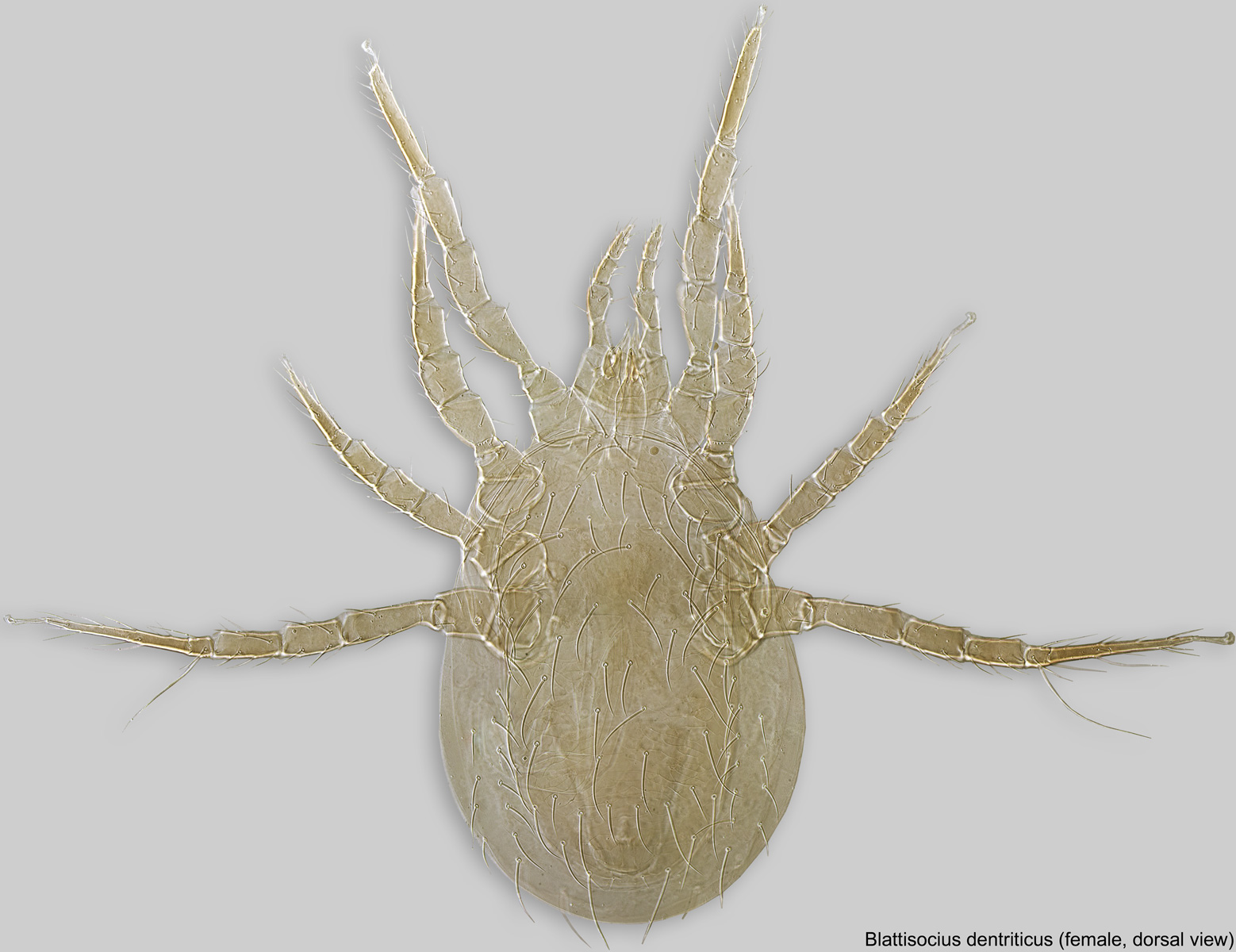
- Blattisocius dentriticus female

Scientific classification
- Kingdom: Animalia
- Phylum: Arthropoda
- Subphylum: Chelicerata
- Class: Arachnida
- Order: Mesostigmata
- Family: Blattisociidae
- Genus: Blattisocius; Keegan, 1944

= Blattisocius =

Genus of mites

Blattisocius is a genus of mites in the family Blattisociidae.

== Description ==
Adult females of Blattisocius have a dorsal shield that is undivided and lacks midlateral incisions. The sternal shield either has 3 pairs of setae or has 2 pairs with the 3rd pair st3 on partially separate platelets. Setae st4 are located either on soft cuticle or on the corners of the sternal shield platelets. There are no isolated metasternal plates. The epigynal shield is truncate posteriorly. The ventrianal shield ranges from subtriangular to bullet-shaped, and bears 3-4 pairs of preanal setae and 3 circumanal setae. The adanal setae are inserted anterior to the posterior margin of the anus. The peritrematic shield is slender, being barely wider than the stigma at the level of the stigma. The corniculi are slender and narrowly separated. The fixed digit of the chelicera has a filiform pilus dentilis. The tectum is convex in shape.

== Ecology ==
Blattisocius have been found on/in live plants (e.g. roses, citrus trees, apple trees), vegetables, stored foods, animal nests (including bee nests), live insects and insect cultures.

They are generally considered to be predators of microarthropods. The species B. patagiorum is believed to be parasitic on noctuid moths.

== Species ==
- Blattisocius aegypticus Nasr, Nawar & Afifi, 1988
- Blattisocius apis Basha & Yousef, 2001
- Blattisocius apisassociae Chinniah & Mohanasundaram, 1995
- Blattisocius capsicum Basha & Yousef, 2001
- Blattisocius changjiangensis (Ma, 2006)
- Blattisocius daci (Narayan & Ghai, 1961)
- Blattisocius dentriticus (Berlese, 1918)
- Blattisocius dolichus Ma, 2006
- Blattisocius edentata (Karg, 1976)
- Blattisocius everti Britto, Lopes & De Moraes, 2012
- Blattisocius incisus Bhattacharyya, 1977
- Blattisocius keegani Fox, 1947
- Blattisocius mali (Oudemans, 1929)
- Blattisocius patagiorum Treat, 1966
- Blattisocius quadridentatus Haines, 1979
- Blattisocius tarsalis (Berlese, 1918)
- Blattisocius thaicocofloris Oliveira, Chandrapatya & De Moraes, 2015
- Blattisocius urticana (Nesbitt, 1954)

Possibly also:

- Blattisocius othreisae Chinniah & Mohanasundaram, 1995
