= Blattisocius capsicum =

Scientific classification
- Kingdom: Animalia
- Phylum: Arthropoda
- Subphylum: Chelicerata
- Class: Arachnida
- Order: Mesostigmata
- Family: Blattisociidae
- Genus: Blattisocius
- Species: B. capsicum

Binomial name
- Blattisocius capsicum Basha & Yousef, 2001

Species of mite

Blattisocius capsicum is a species of mites in the family Blattisociidae.
