= Blattisocius aegypticus =

Scientific classification
- Kingdom: Animalia
- Phylum: Arthropoda
- Subphylum: Chelicerata
- Class: Arachnida
- Order: Mesostigmata
- Family: Blattisociidae
- Genus: Blattisocius
- Species: B. aegypticus

Binomial name
- Blattisocius aegypticus Nasr, Nawar & Afifi, 1988

Species of mite

Blattisocius aegypticus is a species of mites in the family Blattisociidae.
