= Blattisocius keegani =

Scientific classification
- Domain: Eukaryota
- Kingdom: Animalia
- Phylum: Arthropoda
- Subphylum: Chelicerata
- Class: Arachnida
- Order: Mesostigmata
- Family: Blattisociidae
- Genus: Blattisocius
- Species: B. keegani

Binomial name
- Blattisocius keegani Fox, 1947

Species of mite

Blattisocius keegani is a species of mites in the family Blattisociidae. It was described by Fox in 1947.
