= Blattisocius quadridentatus =

Scientific classification
- Kingdom: Animalia
- Phylum: Arthropoda
- Subphylum: Chelicerata
- Class: Arachnida
- Order: Mesostigmata
- Family: Blattisociidae
- Genus: Blattisocius
- Species: B. quadridentatus

Binomial name
- Blattisocius quadridentatus Haines, 1979

Species of mite

Blattisocius quadridentatus is a species of mites in the family Blattisociidae.
