= Blattisocius daci =

Scientific classification
- Kingdom: Animalia
- Phylum: Arthropoda
- Subphylum: Chelicerata
- Class: Arachnida
- Order: Mesostigmata
- Family: Blattisociidae
- Genus: Blattisocius
- Species: B. daci

Binomial name
- Blattisocius daci (Narayan & Ghai, 1961)

Species of mite

Blattisocius daci is a species of mites in the family Blattisociidae.
