= Blattisocius othreisae =

Scientific classification
- Domain: Eukaryota
- Kingdom: Animalia
- Phylum: Arthropoda
- Subphylum: Chelicerata
- Class: Arachnida
- Order: Mesostigmata
- Family: Blattisociidae
- Genus: Blattisocius
- Species: B. othreisae

Binomial name
- Blattisocius othreisae Chinniah & Mohanasundaram, 1995

Species of mite

Blattisocius othreisae is a species of mites in the family Blattisociidae.
