= Blattisocius apis =

Scientific classification
- Kingdom: Animalia
- Phylum: Arthropoda
- Subphylum: Chelicerata
- Class: Arachnida
- Order: Mesostigmata
- Family: Blattisociidae
- Genus: Blattisocius
- Species: B. apis

Binomial name
- Blattisocius apis Basha & Yousef, 2000

Species of mite

Blattisocius apis is a species of mites in the family Blattisociidae.
