= Blattisocius tarsalis =

Scientific classification
- Domain: Eukaryota
- Kingdom: Animalia
- Phylum: Arthropoda
- Subphylum: Chelicerata
- Class: Arachnida
- Order: Mesostigmata
- Family: Blattisociidae
- Genus: Blattisocius
- Species: B. tarsalis

Binomial name
- Blattisocius tarsalis (Berlese, 1918)

Species of mite

Blattisocius tarsalis is a species of mites in the family Blattisociidae. It was described by Berlese in 1918.
