= Florianópolis =

Capital city of Santa Catarina, Brazil

- Municipality
- Município de Florianópolis; Municipality of Florianópolis
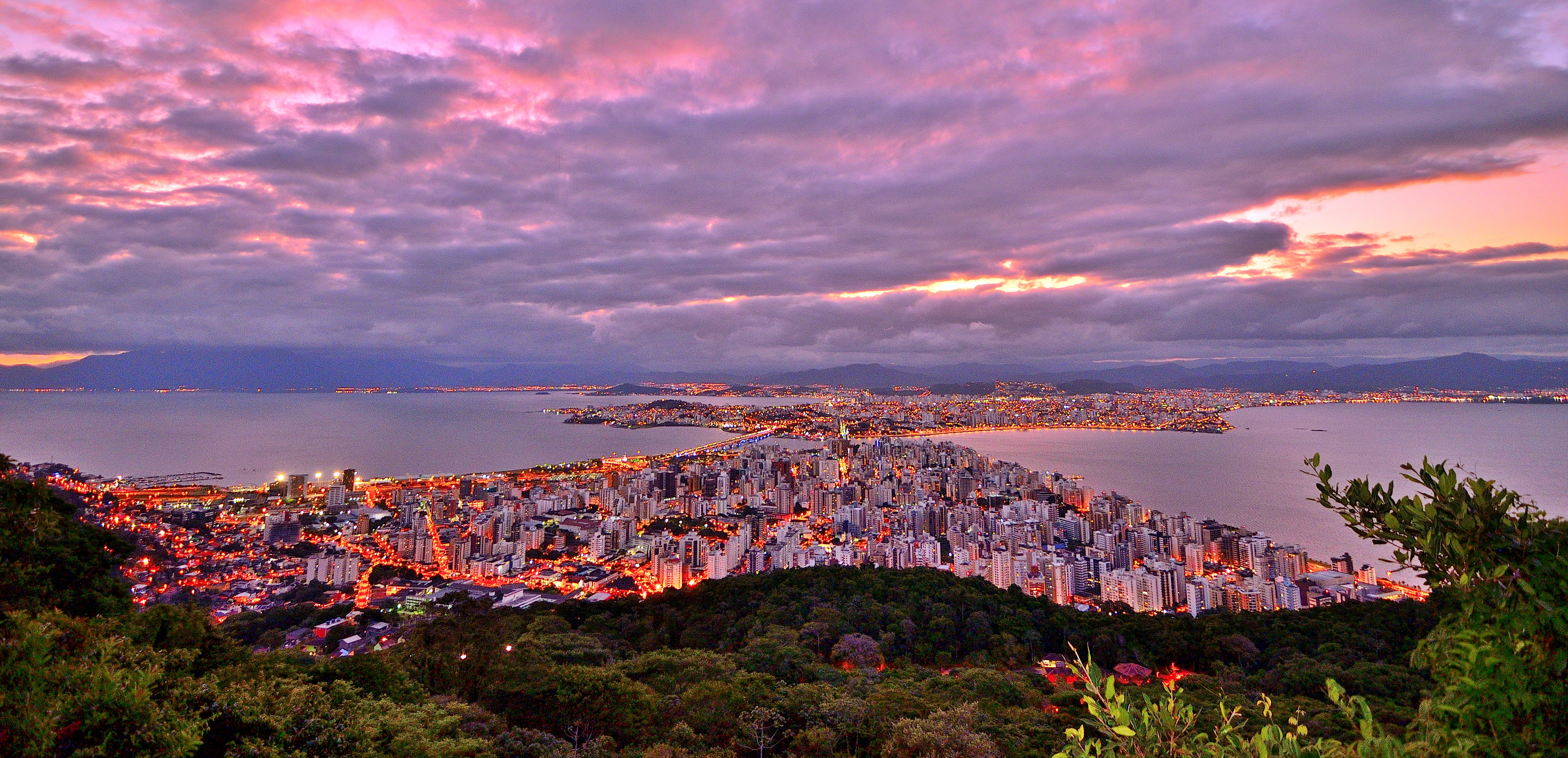
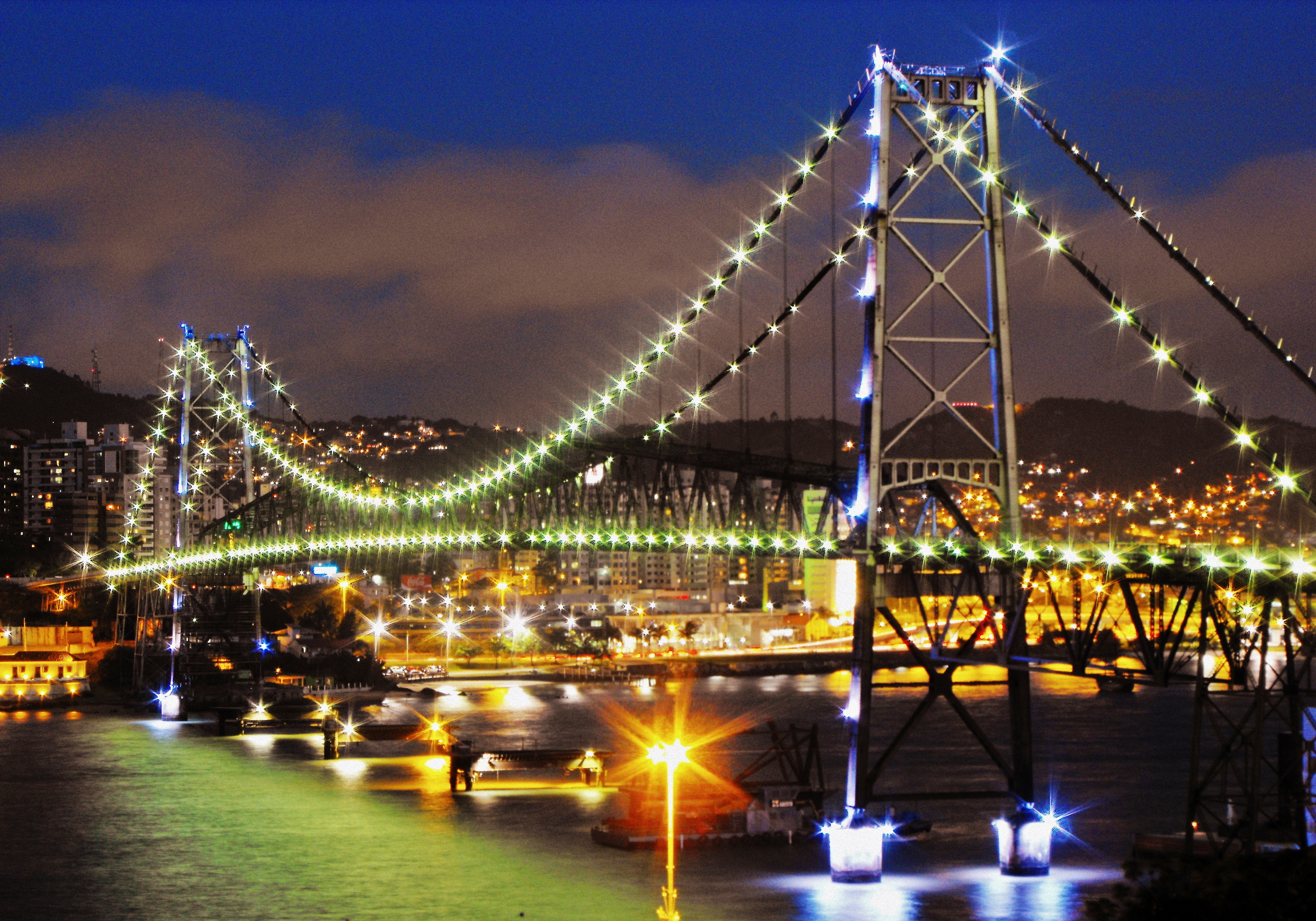
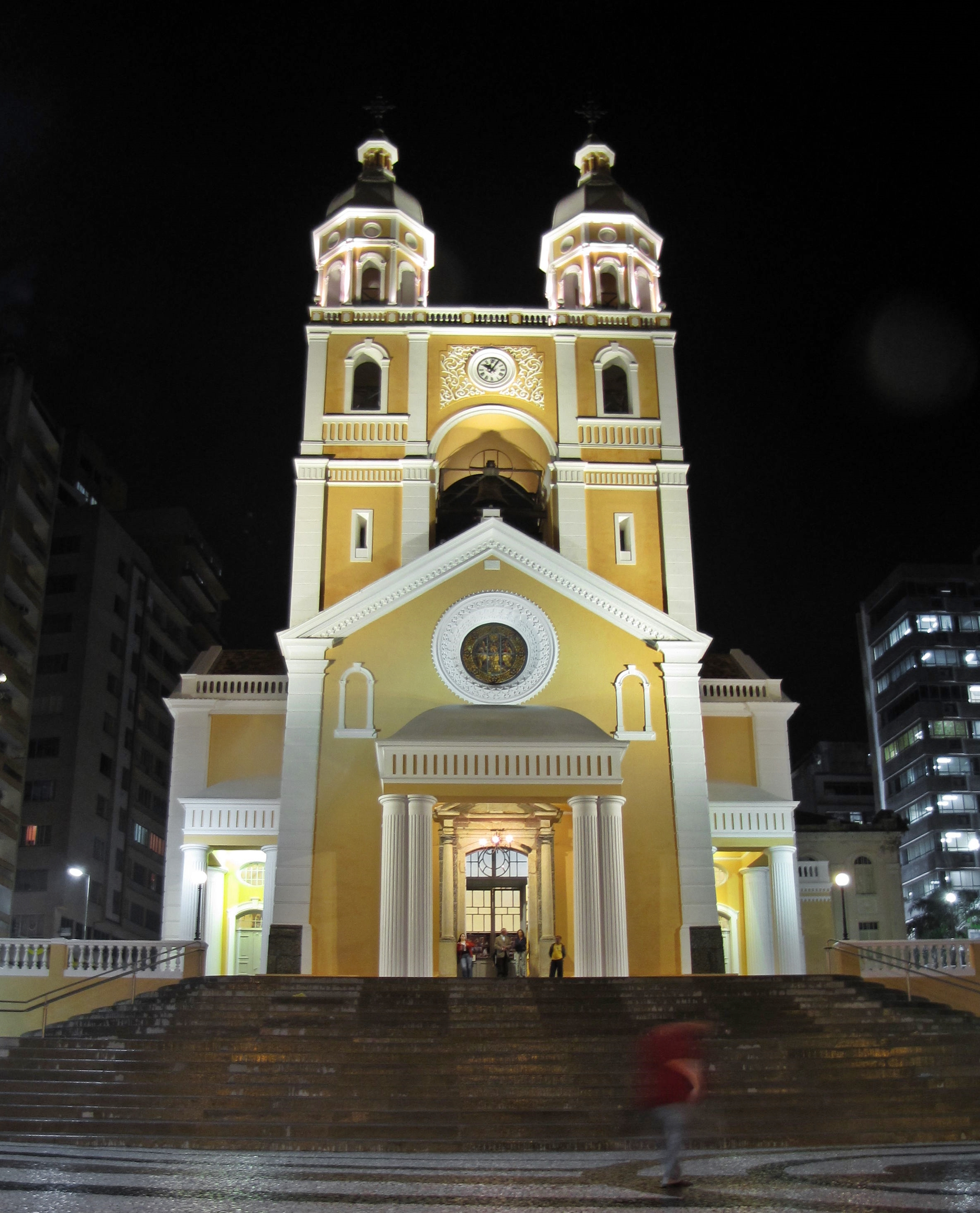
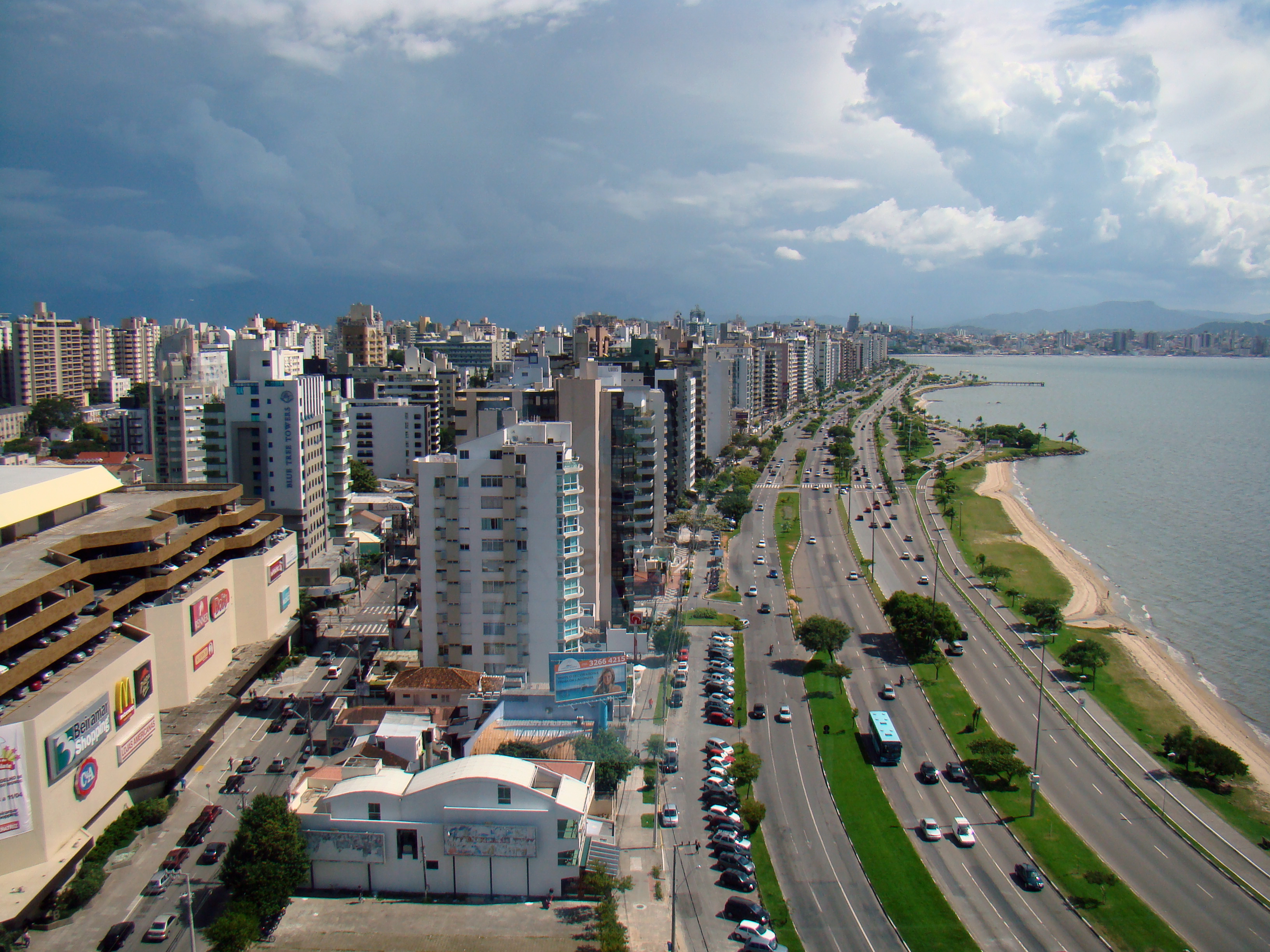
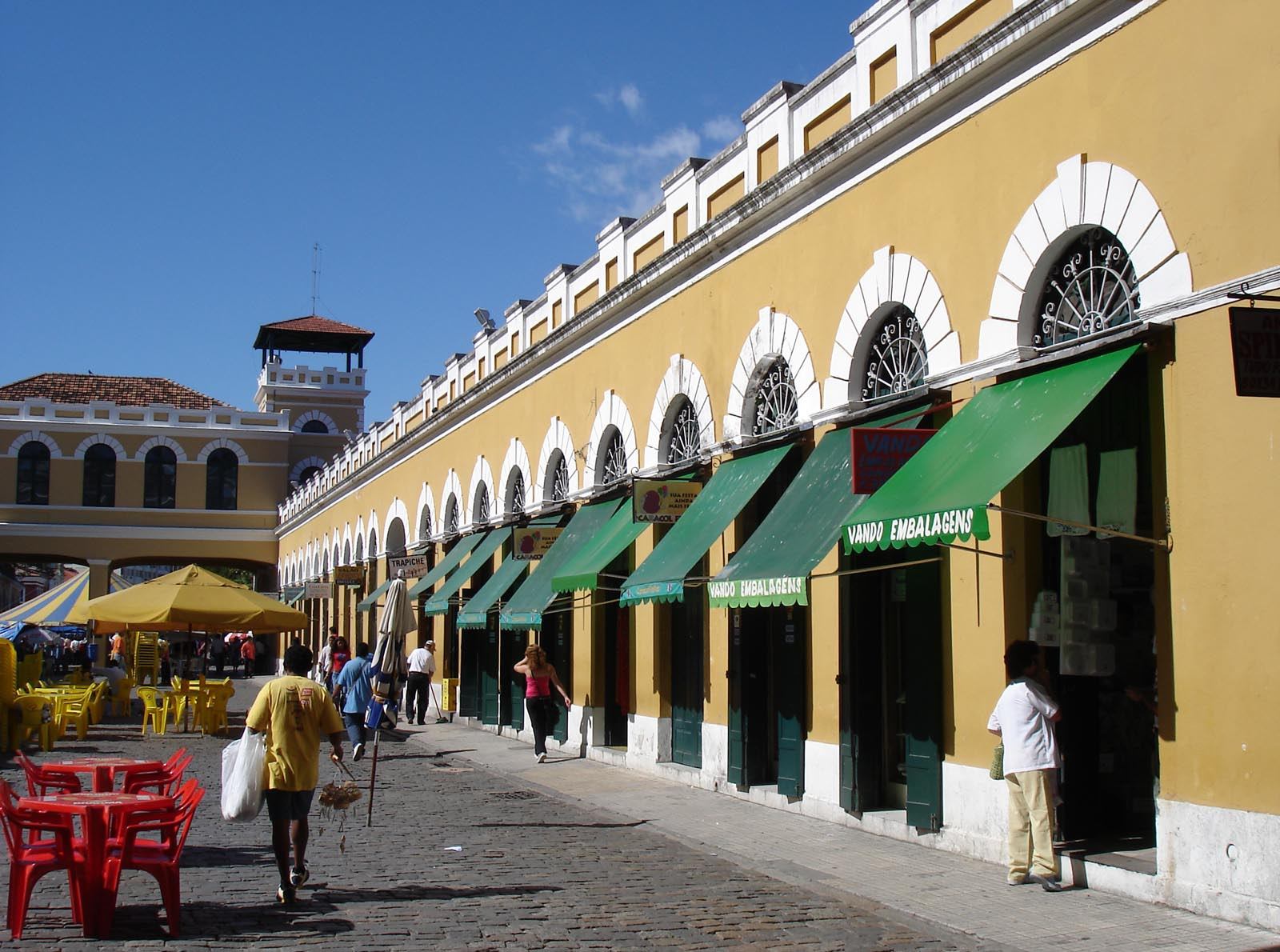
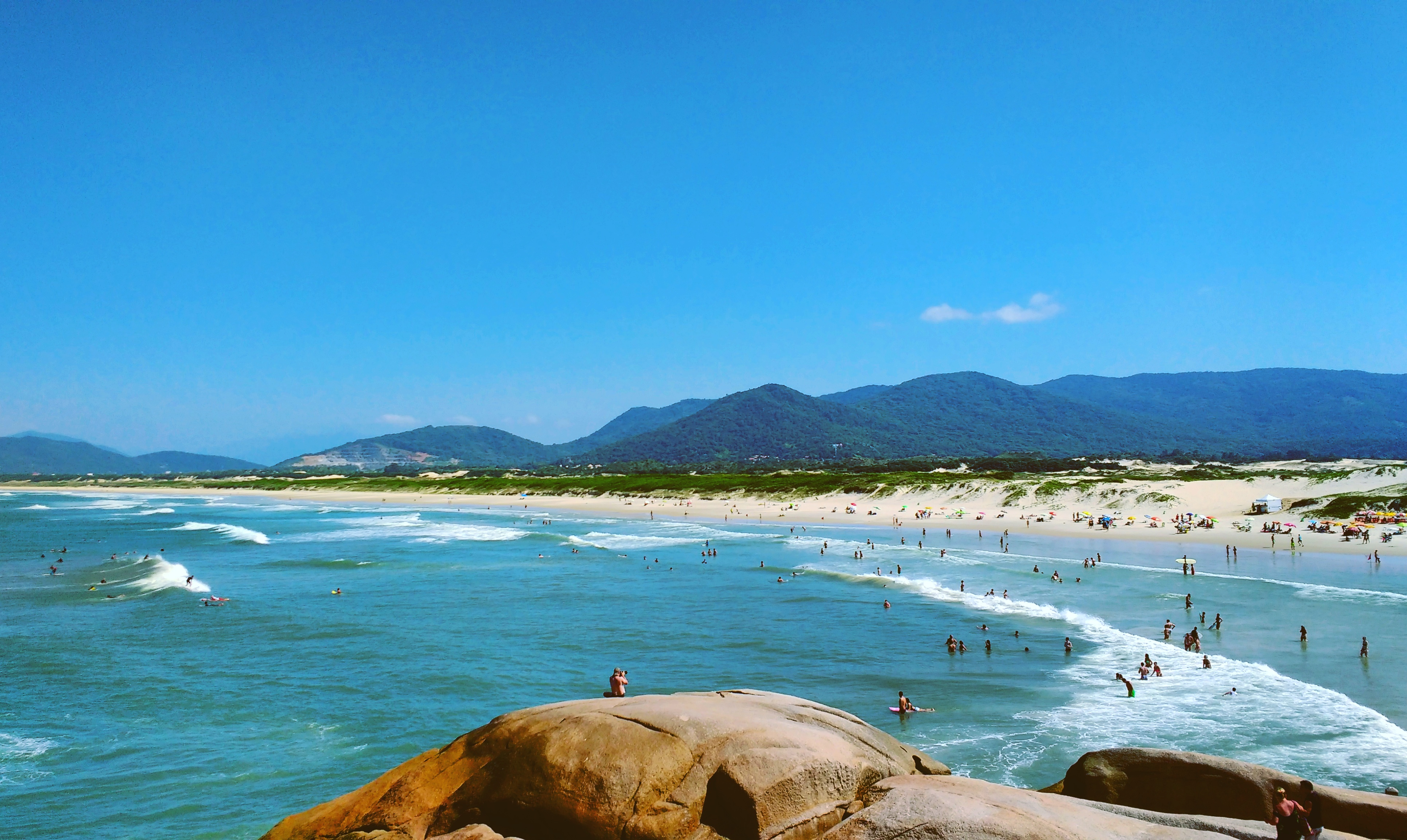
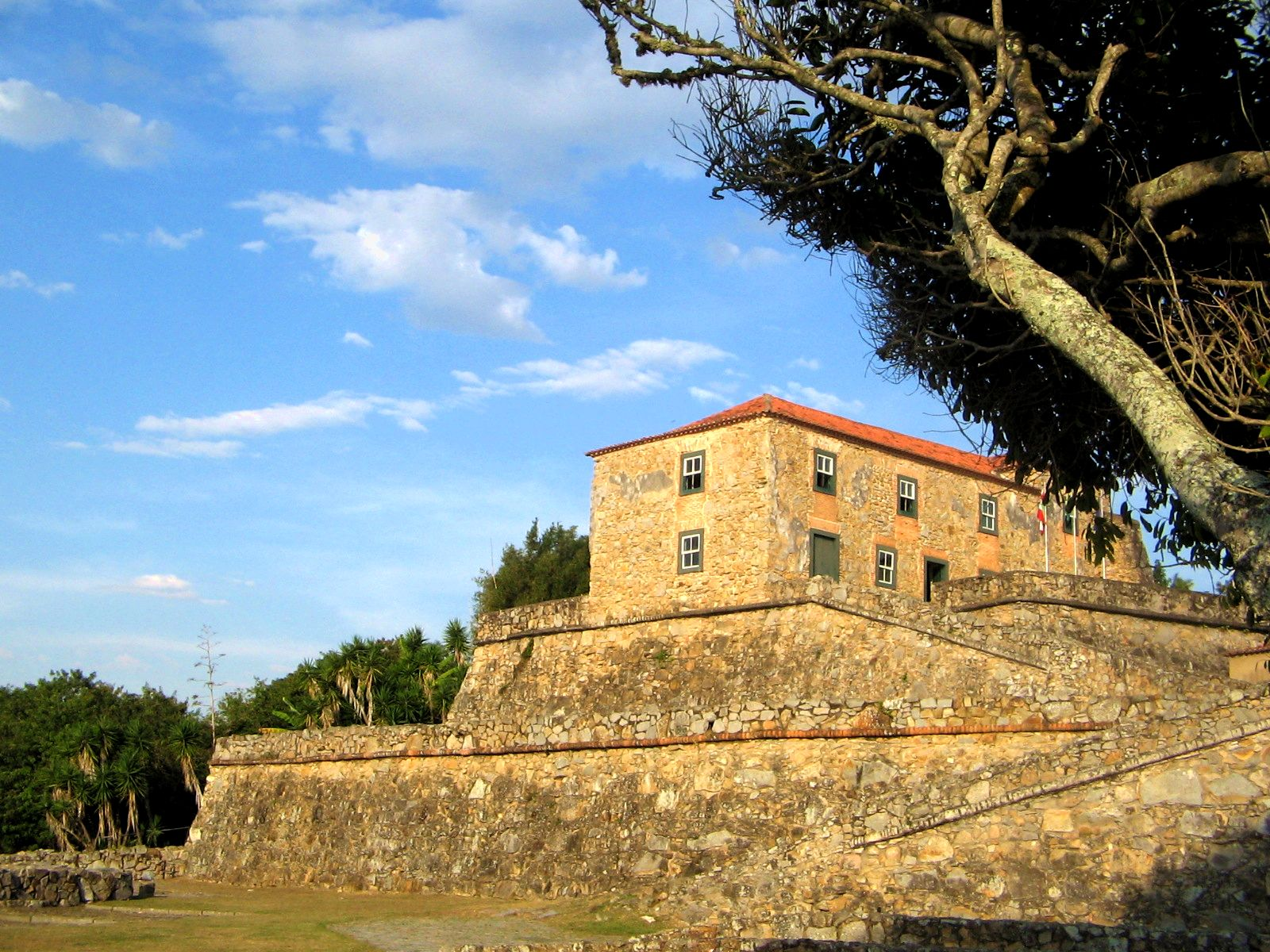
- Skyline from Morro da Cruz Hercílio Luz Bridge Florianópolis Cathedral Beira Mar Avenue Public Market Joaquina Beach Fortress of São José da Ponta Grossa

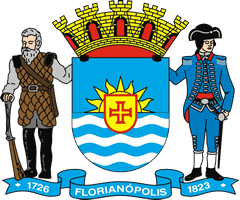
- Flag Coat of arms
- Nicknames: Floripa, Magic Island
- Coordinates: 27°35′33.18″S 48°33′29.385″W
- Country: Brazil
- Region: South
- State: Santa Catarina
- Founded: March 23, 1623; 403 years ago
- Named for: Floriano Peixoto

Government
  - Mayor: Topázio Neto (PSD)

Area
  - Municipality: 675.409 km^{2} (260.777 sq mi)
- Elevation: 3 m (9.8 ft)

Population (2025)
  - Municipality: 587,486
  - Density: 869.823/km^{2} (2,252.83/sq mi)
  - Urban: 358,180
  - Metro: 1,111,702
- Demonym(s): Florianopolitano; Manezinho (colloquial)

GDP (PPP, constant 2015 values)
  - Year: 2023
  - Total: $19.3 billion
- Time zone: UTC-3 (UTC-3)
- Postal Code: 88000-000 to 88099-999
- Area code: (+55) 48
- HDI (2010): 0.847 – very high
- Website: www.pmf.sc.gov.br

Florianópolis (English: /ˌflɔːriəˈnɒpəlɪs/ FLOR-ee-ə-NOP-əl-iss, Brazilian Portuguese: [floɾiaˈnɔpolis]) is the capital and second largest city of the state of Santa Catarina, in the South Region of Brazil. The city encompasses Santa Catarina Island and surrounding small islands, as well as part of the mainland. It has a population of 537,211, according to the 2022 Brazilian census, the second-most populous city in the state (after Joinville), and the 39th in Brazil. The metropolitan area has an estimated population of 1,111,702, the 21st largest in the country. The city is known for having the country's third-highest Human Development Index score among all Brazilian cities (0.847).

The economy of Florianópolis is heavily based on information technology, tourism, and services. The city has 60 beaches and is a center of surfing activity. Lagoa da Conceição is the most famous area for tourism, recreation, nature, and extreme sports. The New York Times reported that "Florianopolis is the party destination of the year in 2009." Newsweek placed Florianópolis in its "ten most dynamic cities of the world" list in 2006. Veja, a Brazilian publication, named the city as "the best place to live in Brazil." As a result of this exposure, Florianópolis is growing as a second home destination for many Paulistas, Argentines, Uruguayans, Americans, and Europeans.

Florianópolis is also commonly known by the nicknames Floripa and Ilha da Magia (Magic Island). Most of the population lives on the mainland and on the island's central and northern parts. The southern half is less inhabited. Many small commercial fishermen populate the island.

The Hercílio Luz International Airport serves the city. Florianópolis is home to the Universidade Federal de Santa Catarina (Federal University of Santa Catarina). There are also the Santa Catarina Federal Institute of Education, Science and Technology (Instituto Federal de Santa Catarina), and two campuses of the Universidade do Estado de Santa Catarina (State University of Santa Catarina), among other institutions of higher and professional education.

The city has been ranked as the safest capital to live in Brazil in 2024, according to the 2024 Security Atlas, released by the Institute for Applied Economic Research (IPEA) and the Brazilian Public Security Forum (FBSP). Among other rankings, it has been placed as well as the 5th best place to retire, in Brazil and the USA, by the Mongeral Aegon Longevity Institute in partnership with FGV.

== Etymology ==
The name Florianópolis is a tribute to Marshal Floriano Peixoto, the second President (1891–1894) of the Republic of the United States of Brazil and from Greek term polis, meaning "city". Until 1893, the city was called Nossa Senhora do Desterro (Portuguese: [ˈnɔsɐ siˈɲɔɾɐ du desˈteʁu] or [dʒisˈteʁu]; lit. 'Our Lady of Banishment') or simply Desterro.

== Geography ==
=== Vegetation ===
Florianópolis lies within the Atlantic Forest, which has an extremely diverse and unique mix of vegetation and forest types. The main ecoregion is the coastal Atlantic forest, the narrow strip of about 50–100 kilometers (31–62 miles) along the coast, which covers about 20 percent of the region. This forest extends as far as 500–600 kilometers (310–370 miles) inland, and its range is as high as 2,000 meters above sea level. Altitude determines at least three vegetation types in the Atlantic Forest: the lowland forest of the coastal plain, montane forests, and the high-altitude grassland or "campo rupestre."

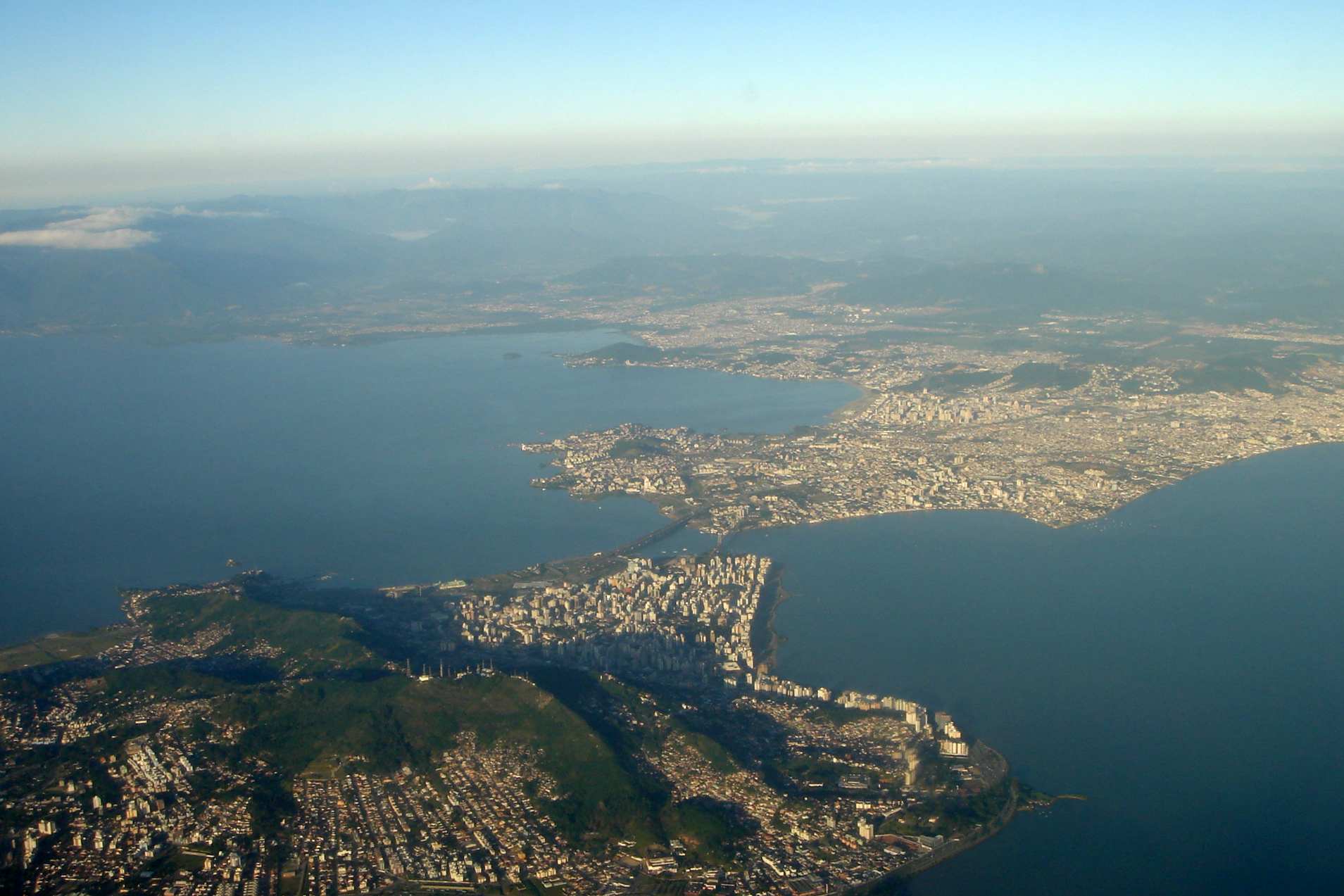
Florianópolis aerial view.

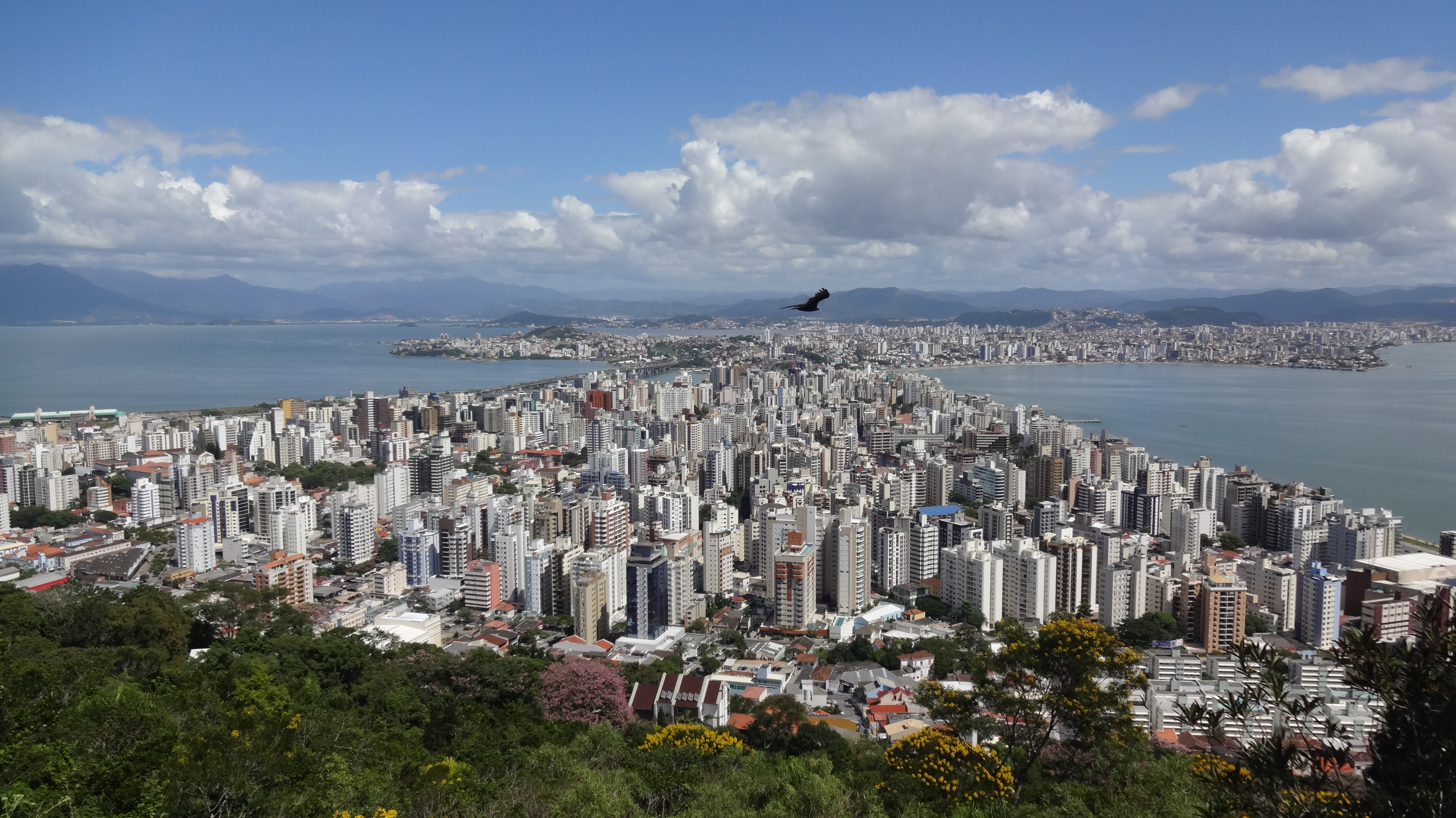
Downtown Florianópolis as seen from Morro da Cruz.

The municipality contains part of the 17,104-hectare (42,260-acre) offshore Marinha do Arvoredo Biological Reserve, a fully protected conservation unit established in 1990. It also contains part of the 84,130-hectare (207,900-acre) Serra do Tabuleiro State Park, a mountainous area covered in lush forests. The park protects the sources of the Vargem do Braço, Cubatão, and Una rivers, which supply most of the drinking water for greater Florianópolis and the south coast region. The municipality contains the 1,532-hectare (3,790-acre) Rio Vermelho State Park in the northeast of Santa Catarina Island, created in 2007.

=== Precipitation ===
There is significant precipitation, which is well distributed throughout the year. The annual normal rainfall for the period of 1961 through 1990 was 1,517.8 millimetres (59.76 in). There is no dry season, and summer generally is the rainiest season. Increased rainfall occurs from January to March, with a median of 160 millimetres (6.3 in) per month, and from April to December, there is somewhat less precipitation, averaging 100 millimetres (3.9 in) per month. The driest months are from June to August.

=== Climate ===
Florianópolis experiences a warm humid subtropical climate (Koppen: Cfa), falling just short of a true tropical climate. The seasons of the year are distinct, with a well-defined summer and winter, and characteristic weather for autumn and spring. Due to the proximity of the sea, the relative humidity of the atmosphere is 80% on average. The city has exact same latitude and climate as Brisbane. Both cities have an average temperature of 21.5°C, and Florianópolis has cooler summers but warmer winters.

The area is threatened by climate change, with rising sea levels expected to lead to increased coastal erosion. Mangroves are being planted in and around the city to help mitigate potential damage while restoring local ecosystems.

The maximum temperatures of the hottest month varies from 25 to 38.8 °C (77.0 to 101.8 °F) and the minimum temperatures are from 6 to 11 °C (43 to 52 °F). The lowest temperature ever recorded was −0.4 °C (31.3 °F) in July 2000 while the highest temperature ever recorded was 38.8 °C (101.8 °F) in February 1973.

Climate data for Florianópolis (1991–2020 normals, extremes 1961–present))
Month	Jan	Feb	Mar	Apr	May	Jun	Jul	Aug	Sep	Oct	Nov	Dec	Year
Record high °C (°F)	40.0 (104.0)	38.8 (101.8)	36.9 (98.4)	35.4 (95.7)	33.5 (92.3)	32.0 (89.6)	32.7 (90.9)	35.0 (95.0)	32.9 (91.2)	35.4 (95.7)	34.8 (94.6)	38.6 (101.5)	40.0 (104.0)
Mean daily maximum °C (°F)	29.4 (84.9)	29.5 (85.1)	28.7 (83.7)	26.9 (80.4)	24.0 (75.2)	21.9 (71.4)	21.1 (70.0)	21.8 (71.2)	22.4 (72.3)	24.2 (75.6)	26.1 (79.0)	28.3 (82.9)	25.4 (77.6)
Daily mean °C (°F)	25.2 (77.4)	25.3 (77.5)	24.4 (75.9)	22.4 (72.3)	19.5 (67.1)	17.2 (63.0)	16.5 (61.7)	17.4 (63.3)	18.7 (65.7)	20.6 (69.1)	22.3 (72.1)	24.2 (75.6)	21.1 (70.1)
Mean daily minimum °C (°F)	21.6 (70.9)	21.7 (71.1)	20.7 (69.3)	18.7 (65.7)	15.7 (60.3)	13.6 (56.5)	12.9 (55.2)	13.8 (56.8)	15.4 (59.7)	17.5 (63.5)	18.8 (65.8)	20.5 (68.9)	17.6 (63.6)
Record low °C (°F)	14.6 (58.3)	14.8 (58.6)	10.2 (50.4)	7.7 (45.9)	3.3 (37.9)	1.7 (35.1)	−0.4 (31.3)	0.9 (33.6)	0.7 (33.3)	8.2 (46.8)	9.4 (48.9)	12.5 (54.5)	−0.4 (31.3)
Average precipitation mm (inches)	241.3 (9.50)	198.3 (7.81)	180.4 (7.10)	115.8 (4.56)	126.2 (4.97)	86.3 (3.40)	100.8 (3.97)	93.0 (3.66)	146.9 (5.78)	153.2 (6.03)	146.6 (5.77)	177.2 (6.98)	1,766 (69.53)
Average precipitation days (≥ 1.0 mm)	16	15	14	9	9	7	9	7	11	13	13	12	135
Average relative humidity (%)	79.0	79.4	79.2	79.7	80.7	81.9	82.4	80.7	80.0	80.0	77.4	77.9	79.9
Average dew point °C (°F)	21.8 (71.2)	21.9 (71.4)	21.1 (70.0)	19.2 (66.6)	16.6 (61.9)	14.6 (58.3)	13.9 (57.0)	14.4 (57.9)	15.4 (59.7)	17.4 (63.3)	18.5 (65.3)	20.4 (68.7)	17.9 (64.3)
Mean monthly sunshine hours	190.7	174.0	186.7	179.5	173.4	153.0	162.2	166.7	141.3	142.7	180.5	191.2	2,041.9
Mean daily daylight hours	13.6	13.0	12.2	11.4	10.8	10.4	10.6	11.2	12.0	12.8	13.5	13.9	12.1
Average ultraviolet index	12	12	11	8	5	4	4	6	8	10	12	12	9
Source 1: Instituto Nacional de Meteorologia
Source 2: Meteo Climat (record highs and lows)

=== Neighbourhoods ===
Neighbourhoods of Florianópolis with population in 2000
Position	Neighbourhoods	Population
1	Centro	44,074
2	Capoeiras	19,323
3	Trindade	15,031
4	Agronômica	14,591
5	Saco dos Limões	13,771
6	Coqueiros	13,592
7	Monte Cristo	12,634
8	Jardim Atlântico	12,047
9	Itacorubi	10,307
10	Costeira do Pirajubaé	9,301
11	Capivari	8,686
12	Tapera da Base	7,081
13	Estreito	7,007
14	Monte Verde	6,198
15	Balneário	6,110
16	São João do Rio Vermelho	5,571
17	Canto	5,560
18	Abraão	5,210
19	Santa Mônica	5,081
20	Lagoa	5,081
21	Saco Grande	5,002
22	Córrego Grande	4,833
23	Canasvieiras	4,822
24	Pantanal	4,703
25	Coloninha	4,432
26	Barra da Lagoa	3,812
27	Carianos	3,656
28	José Mendes	3,514
29	Ingleses Centro	3,142
30	João Paulo	3,057
31	Campeche Leste	2,974
32	Campeche Sul	2,802
33	Rio Tavares Central	2,613
34	Santinho	2,521
35	Ponta das Canas	2,473
36	Vargem do Bom Jesus	2,286
37	Armação	2,247
38	Cachoeira do Bom Jesus Leste	2,241
39	Pântano do Sul	2,234
40	Itaguaçu	2,229
41	Jurere Leste	2,031
42	Campeche Norte	2,009
43	Vargem Grande	1,875
44	Campeche Central	1,815
45	Ressacada	1,690
46	Morro das Pedras	1,527
47	Alto Ribeirão Leste	1,493
48	Alto Ribeirão	1,487
49	Ribeirão da Ilha	1,376
50	Santo Antônio	1,352
51	Sambaqui	1,345
52	Ingleses Sul	1,323
53	Bom Abrigo	1,262
54	Jurere Oeste	1,221
55	Porto da Lagoa	1,200
56	Cachoeira do Bom Jesus	1,199
57	Rio Tavares do Norte	1,082
58	Pedregal	1,034
59	Ratones	1,023
60	Canto da Lagoa	980
61	Retiro	943
62	Cacupé	863
63	Lagoa Pequena	857
64	Barra do Sambaqui	781
65	Caiacanga	769
66	Lagoinha do Norte	651
67	Base Aérea	605
68	Pedrita	589
69	Açores	552
70	Costeira do Ribeirão	540
71	Moenda	533
72	Tapera	430
73	Daniela	426
74	Vargem Pequena	418
75	Canto dos Araçás	408
76	Recanto dos Açores	382
77	Canto do Lamim	348
78	Vargem de Fora	345
79	Dunas da Lagoa	331
80	Autódromo	299
81	Forte	266
82	Ingleses Norte	203
83	Caieira	170
84	Praia Brava	130
85	Praia Mole	108

== History ==
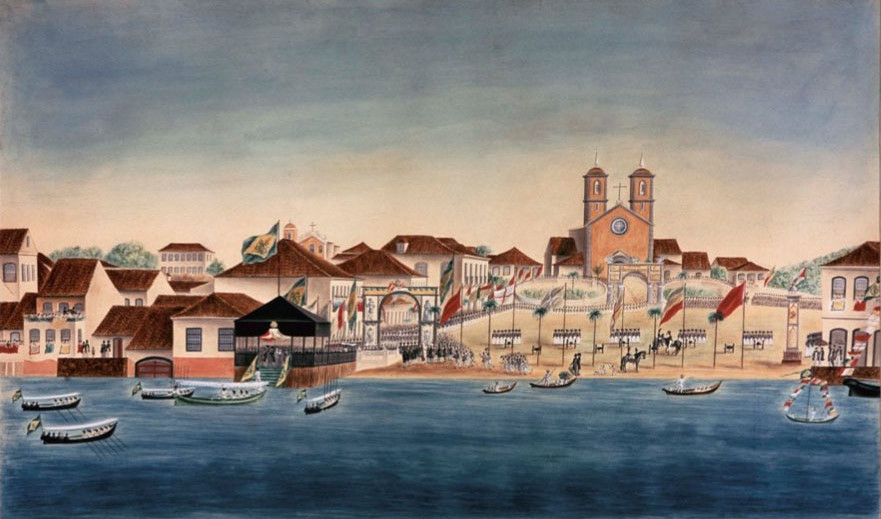
Emperor Pedro II and Empress Teresa Cristina arriving in Florianópolis, c. 1845

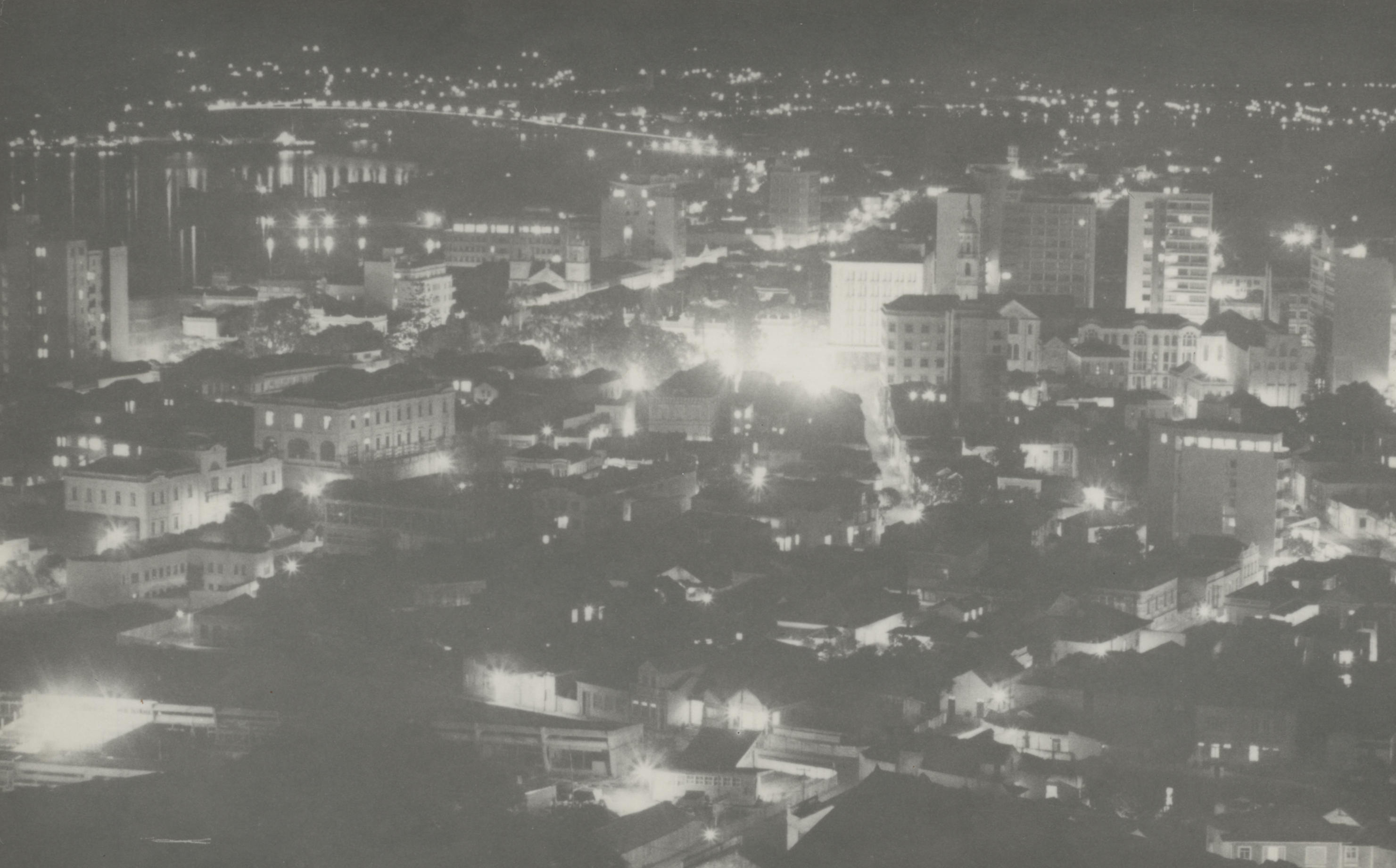
The city in 1964.

Carijós Indians, a Tupi people, were the first inhabitants of the Florianópolis area. The traces of its presence are verified through archaeological sites and sambaquis dating up to 4000 years ago. The Indians called the place Meiembipe, meaning "mountain along the channel."

Around 1514, the Portuguese landed and gave the area the name Ilha dos Patos (Island of the Ducks), but in 1526 it was renamed Ilha de Santa Catarina (Saint Catherine's Island). The area supplied the vessels that went to the River Plate (Río de la Plata) Basin.

The official settlement of the island began in 1673 with the arrival of bandeirante Francisco Dias Velho's agricultural company, and it continued in 1678 with the construction of a chapel consecrated to Nossa Senhora do Desterro. At this time, a villa began to take form, slowly becoming a colonial settlement.

To guarantee its domain, the Portuguese Crown elevated Santa Catarina Island to the category of village in 1714 with the name of Nossa Senhora do Desterro, and already in 1726, they promoted it again, now to the category of town.

From this date on, Vila do Desterro and mainly the port began to have a strategic function because it was situated halfway between Rio de Janeiro and Buenos Aires, possibly two of the largest seaside cities of South America at that time. For this reason, in 1739, the Capitania da Ilha de Santa Catarina was created, and Desterro became its capital. Soon, the most expressive seaside defensive ring of Southern Brazil started to be built: Santa Cruz, São José da Ponta Grossa, Santo Antonio, and Nossa Senhora da Conceição da Barra do Sul fortresses.

With the coming of the Captaincy, the population began to grow, but the great population growth happened between 1747 and 1756 with the arrival of about 6,000 settlers coming from the Archipelago of Azores and from Madeira Island. The development of agriculture, the cotton and linen industry, and the commerce followed the Azorean occupation. In 1823, during the monarchy which ended in 1889, Desterro became the Capital of Santa Catarina Province, opening a period of prosperity with many urban works and also intense political organization.

Regional elites, unhappy with the government centralization, staged the Federalist Revolt at the beginning of the Brazilian Republic. The movement that started in Rio Grande do Sul spread to Santa Catarina and turned Desterro into the Federalist Capital of the Republic. The then president of Brazil, Marshal Floriano Peixoto, known as the Iron Marshal, suppressed the rebellion and ordered the shooting of many people who were considered enemies of the state, in the Anhatomirim Island Fortress. Possibly to show loyalty to the marshal, 1893 saw the change of the state capital's name: from Desterro to Florianópolis, that is to say, the city of Floriano.

== Demographics ==
Race and ethnicity in Florianópolis
Ethnicity	Percentage
White	76.4%
Pardo (Multiracial)	16.3%
Black	6.7%
Asian	0.4%
Amerindian	0.2%

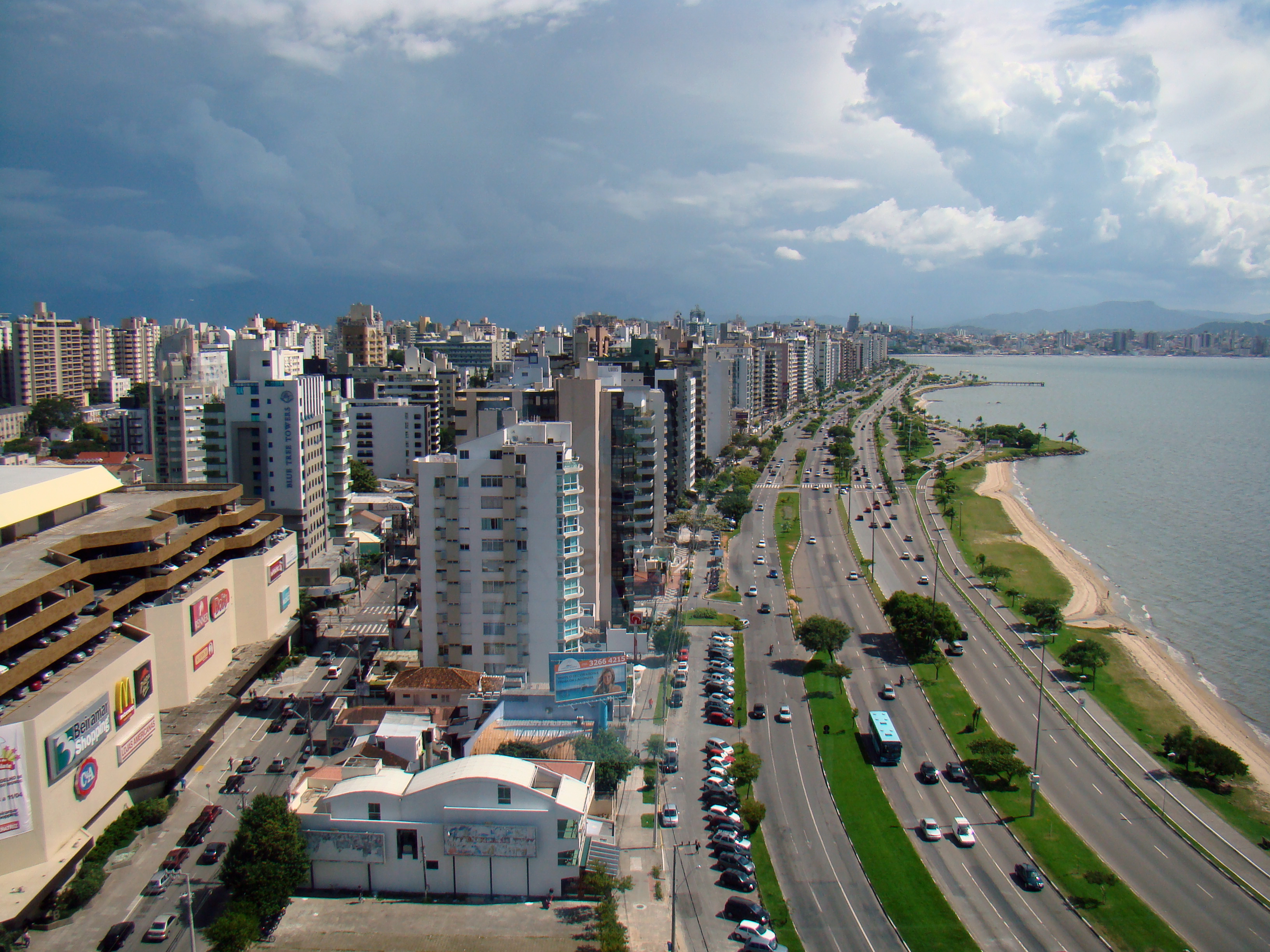
Beira Mar Avenue.

Religion in Florianópolis (2010)
1. Catholic Church (63.7%)
2. Protestantism (12.8%)
3. Spiritism (7.48%)
4. Other religions (4.05%)
5. Irreligious (11.8%)

Historical population
Year	Pop.	±%
1970	138,337	—
1980	187,880	+35.8%
1991	255,390	+35.9%
2000	342,315	+34.0%
2010	421,240	+23.1%
2022	537,211	+27.5%

According to the 2022 census, there were 537,211 people residing in the city. The population density was 623.68 inhabitants per square kilometre (1,615.3/sq mi). The last PNAD (National Research for Sample of Domiciles) census revealed the following numbers: 410,298 White people (76.4%), 87,542 Pardo (Multiracial) people (16.3%), 35,813 Black people (6.7%), 2.398 Asian people (0.4%) and 1,148 Amerindian people (0.2%).

Florianópolis has a population mostly composed of Brazilians of European descent. The number of immigrants started to increase in the mid-18th century, mostly with the arrival of Portuguese colonists from the Azores Islands. The population of Florianópolis was composed mainly of Portuguese/Azoreans, Germans, and Italians. Further south, some neighborhoods preserve their rural village identity. The cultural heritage left by their Azorean ancestors is noticeable in their dialect, in handicrafts, and in traditional festivities.

The small village of Santo António de Lisboa (Saint Anthony of Lisbon) is an example of colonial period architecture and in Ribeirão da Ilha, the oldest part of the capital, the inhabitants speak in an accent closer to the Azorean dialect of the first settlers. In Ribeirão da Ilha is the church of Our Lady of Lapa do Ribeirão, built in 1806. Lagoa da Conceição, with its many sand dunes, restaurants, and seaside nightlife, and where women make lace to sell in the street, has also managed to retain many traces of its colonial architecture.

The city is densely populated, with a population distribution of 623.68 inhab./km^{2}, the 6th highest in the state of Santa Catarina. The vast majority of Florianopólis residents live in the urban area of the municipality, corresponding to 96.2% of its inhabitants, while 3.78% live in the rural area of Florianópolis.

On the other side, the city has taken on a cosmopolitan air with the arrival of Brazilians from other states and foreigners who chose to live there. The island, which at the beginning of the colonization period was an important whale hunting centre, is today a technological pole of the IT industry. A State Capital of interest to tourism, Florianópolis' population in 2020 was estimated to be around 508,826 people in the city proper and 1,111,702 people in the metropolitan area.

=== Religion ===
According to the 2022 Brazilian Census, most of the population (53.2%) is Roman Catholic, other religious groups include Protestants and evangelicals (14.46%), Spiritists (5.78%), Umbandists and Candomblé(2.09%), No religion (18.42%), and people with other religions (5.78%).

== Economy ==
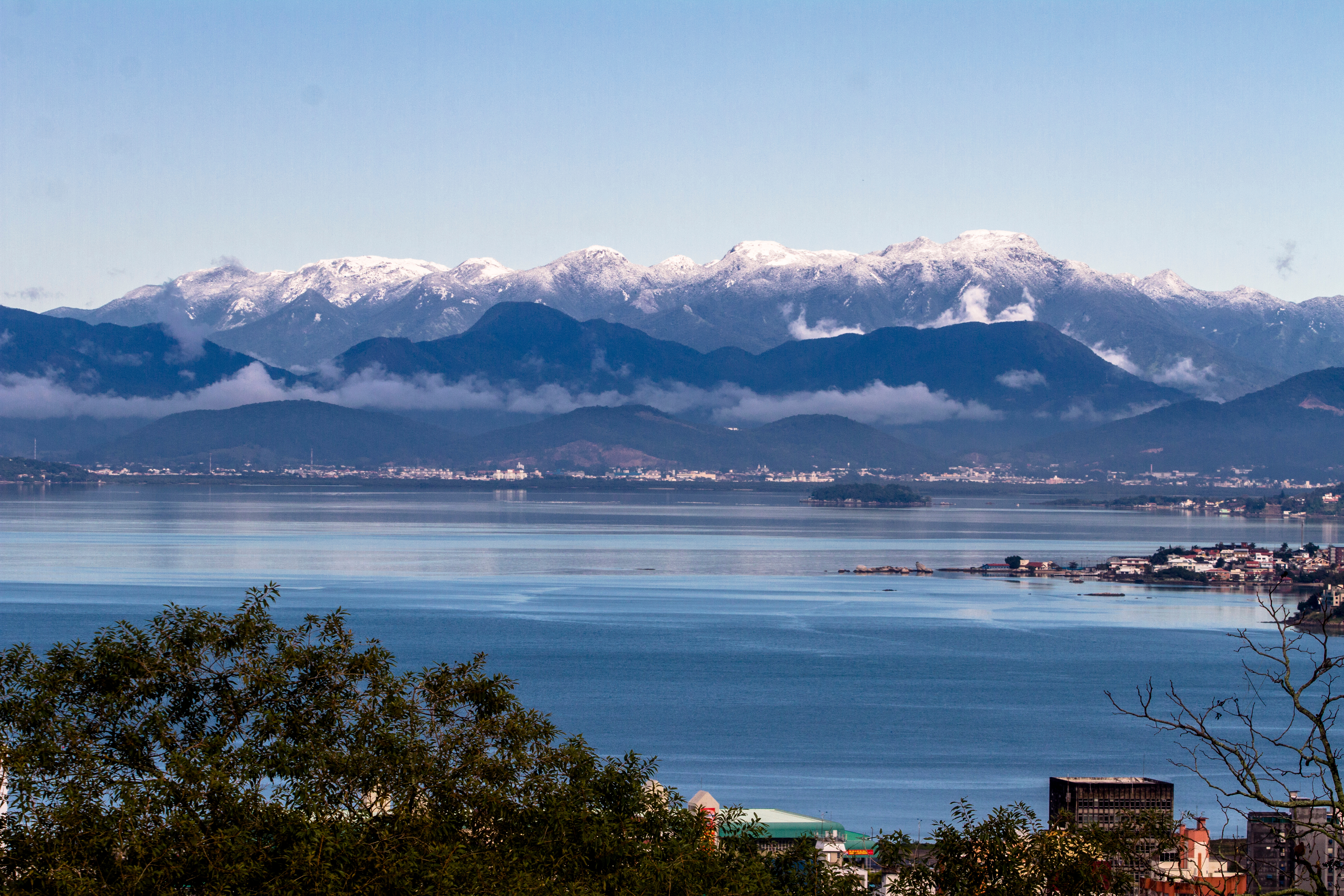
Great Florianópolis seen from Santa Catarina Island with Serra do Tabuleiro State Park (background).

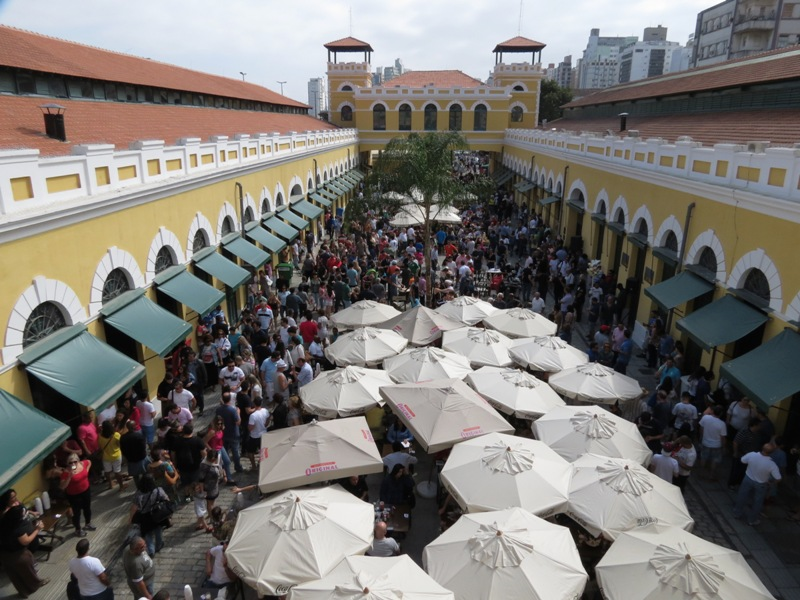
Florianópolis Public Market.

According to 2002 Sefaz statistics, agricultural activities represented 0.05%, manufacturing represented 3.41% and the commerce and service sector 96.54%.

Tourism is one of the staples of Florianópolis's economy, and relates to not only Floripa's Azorean culture but also the fact that it is situated on the coastline. Its environmental restrictions on building and commercial development have been more or less strictly enforced, helping it to keep its original character.

The city has invested heavily in infrastructure, from roads to schools, and Florianópolis ranks high on development measures such as literacy (97 percent) and electrification (near 100 percent). By the late 1990s, private companies were flocking to the island, or emerging from a technology "incubator" at the federal university. (Among the innovations it hatched: the computerized voting machines that have reduced fraud and increased efficiency in Brazilian elections.) Local officials now say they aim to be the Silicon Valley of Brazil, with beaches.

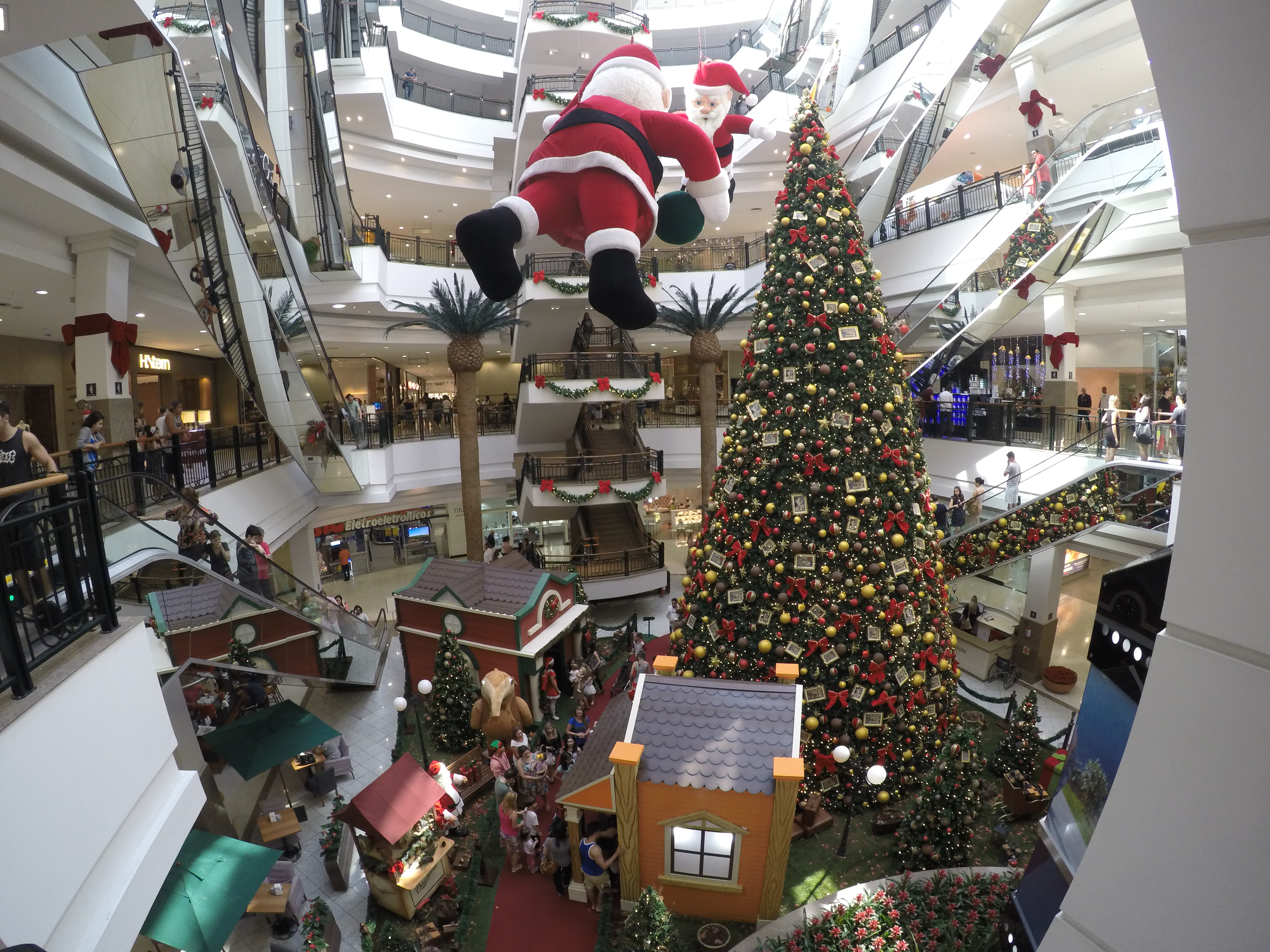
A mall in Florianópolis

In addition to its white sand beaches, Florianópolis offers many historical attractions, including the sites of the original Azorean colonists, the Lagoa da Conceição lagoon, and Santo Antônio de Lisboa. Tourism in Florianópolis has grown significantly over the past 10 years, with increasing numbers of visitors coming from other large cities in Brazil (particularly Porto Alegre, Curitiba, São Paulo and Rio de Janeiro) as well as other South American countries (particularly Argentina, with direct flights offered daily from Buenos Aires).

During the past decade, technology and software development firms also experienced strong growth, and today Information Technology services are one of the top revenue generators in Florianópolis. Several technology centers are spread around Florianópolis, making the city an important pole in this economic sector.

The GDP for the city was R$323,264,000,000 (2019).

The per capita income for the city was R$45,602 (2021).

== Education ==
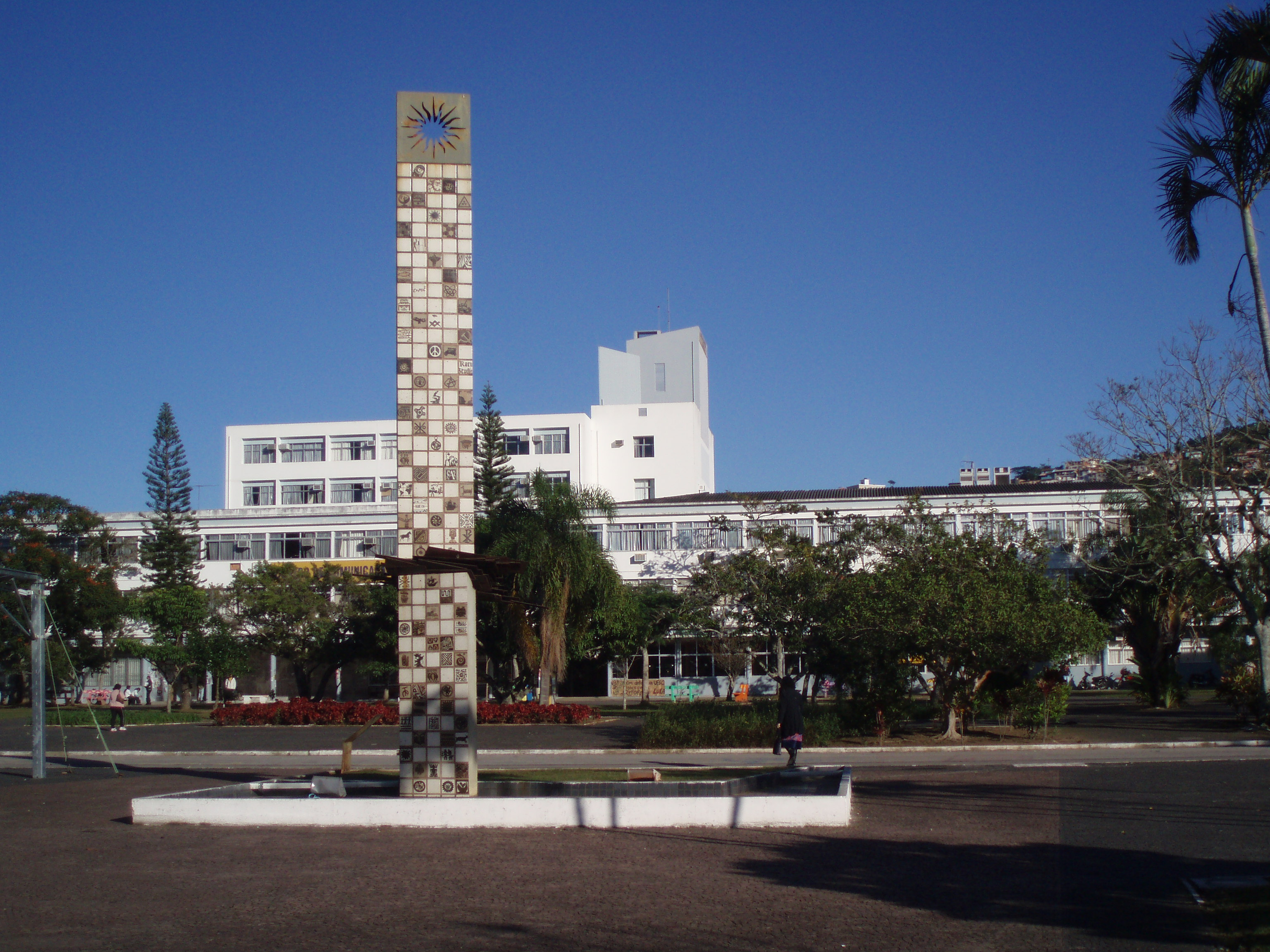
Federal University of Santa Catarina.

=== Educational institutions ===
- Universidade Federal de Santa Catarina (UFSC);
- Universidade do Estado de Santa Catarina (UDESC);
- Serviço Nacional de Aprendizagem Comercial (Senac/SC)
- Complexo de Ensino Superior de Santa Catarina (CESUSC);
- Universidade do Sul de Santa Catarina (UNISUL);
- Universidade do Vale do Itajaí (UNIVALI);
- Centro Universitário Estácio de Sá de Santa Catarina;
- Instituto Federal de Educação, Ciência e Tecnologia de Santa Catarina (IFSC);
- and many others.

=== Primary and secondary schools ===
The Florianópolis high schools that obtained the best results on the 2007 Exame Nacional do Ensino Médio (National High School Exam) are Escola Autonomia, Colégio da Lagoa, Colégio Energia, Colégio Tendência, Colégio Expoente, Colégio Adventista de Florianópolis, Colégio Geração, Colégio de Aplicação UFSC, EEB Feliciano Nunes Pires, IFSC, Colégio Decisão, EEB Professor AníbalNunes Pires, Instituto Estadual de Educação, EEB Osmar Cunha, EEb Getúlio Vargas, EEB Presidente Roosevelt, EEB Professor Henrique Stodieck.

== Tourism and lifestyle ==
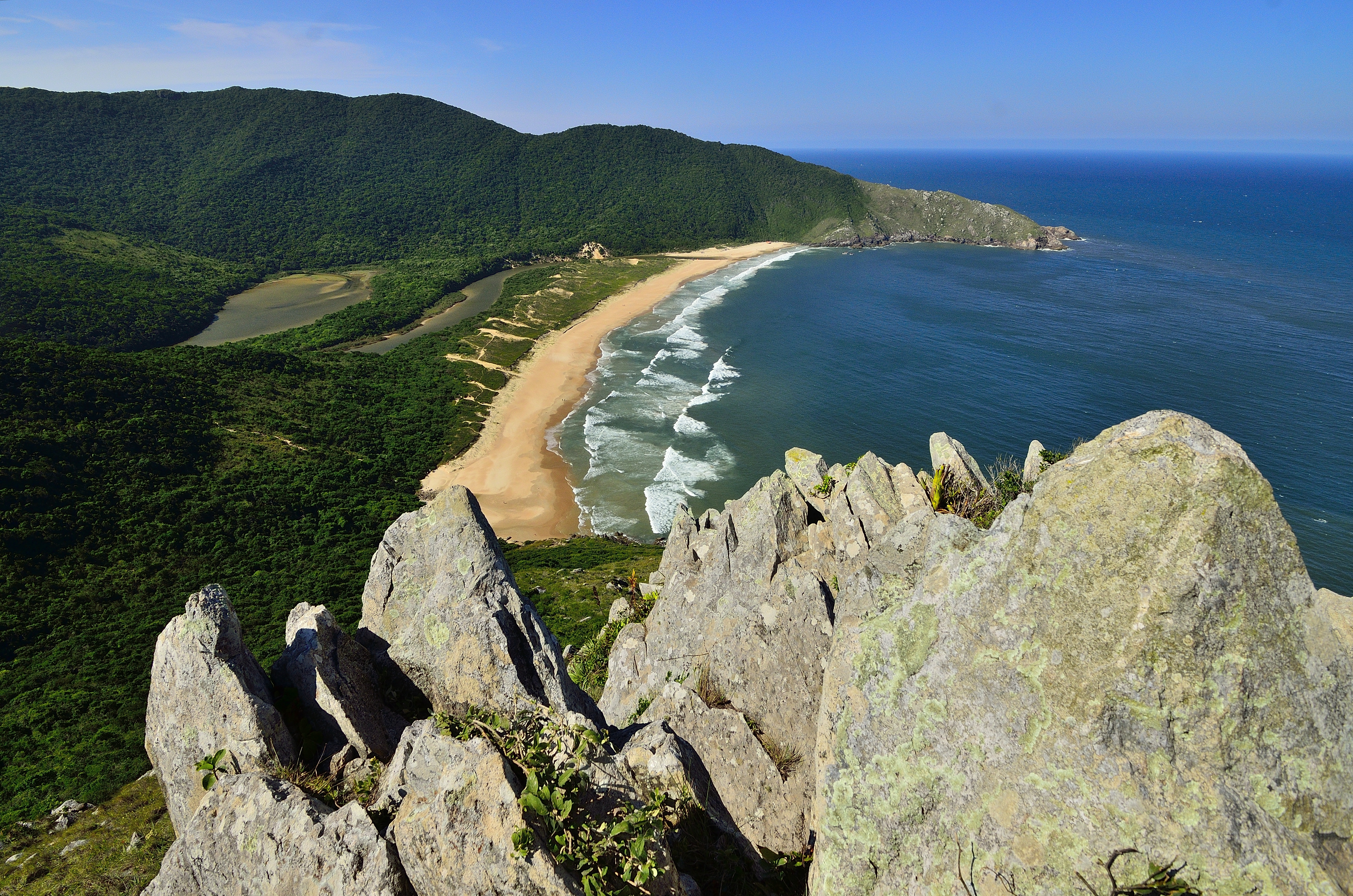
Lagoinha do Leste Beach.

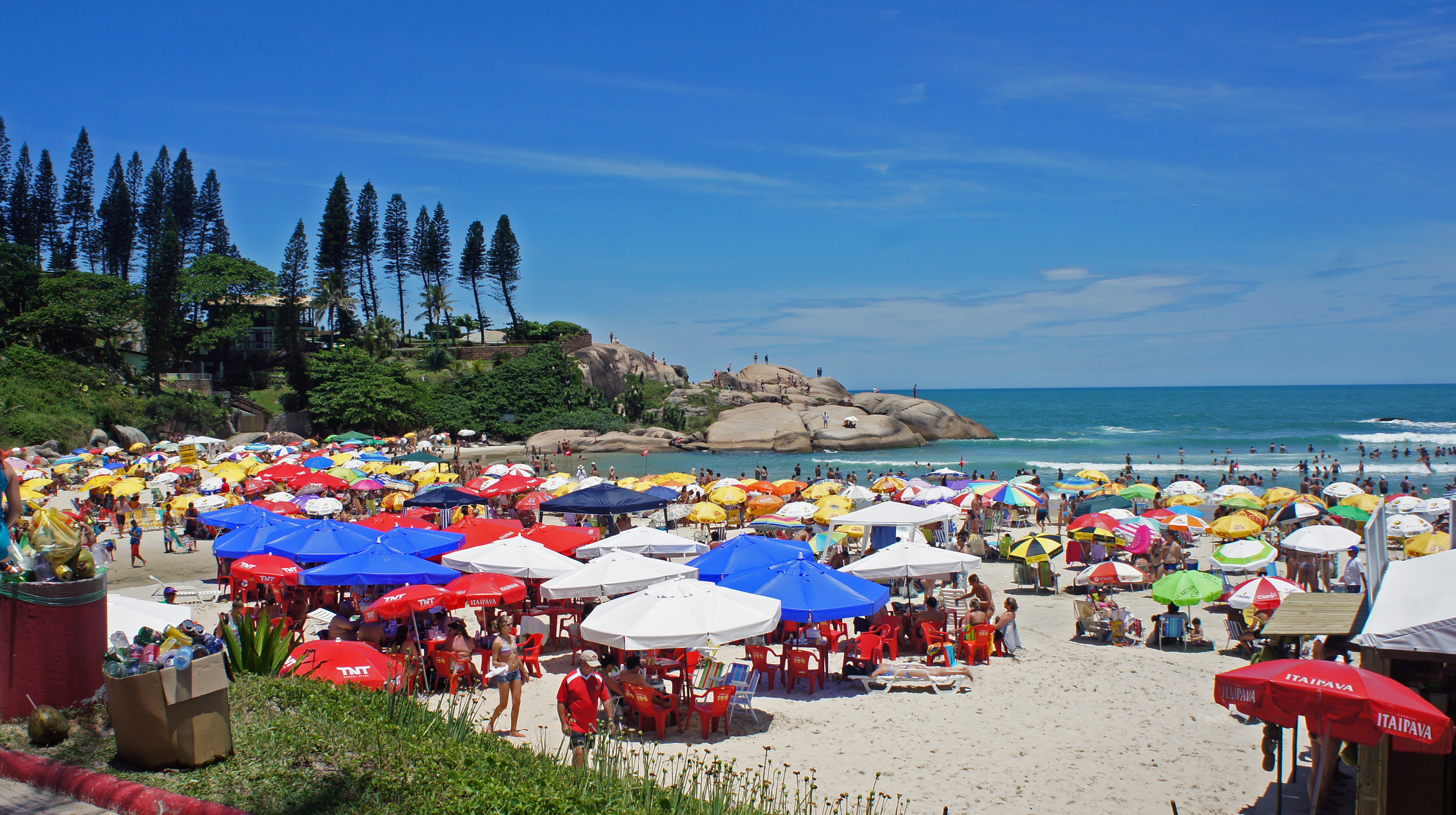
Joaquina Beach.

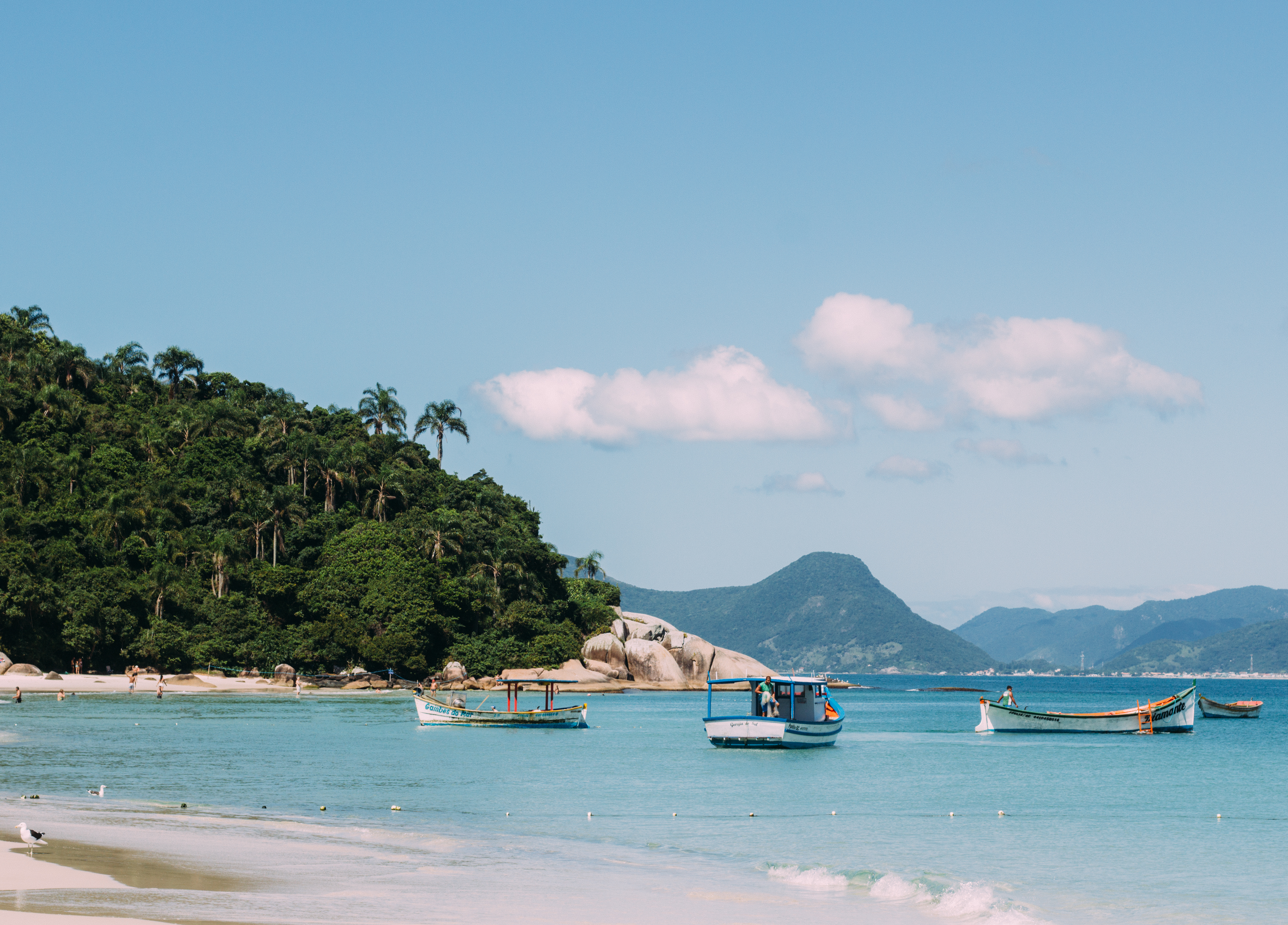
Campeche beach.

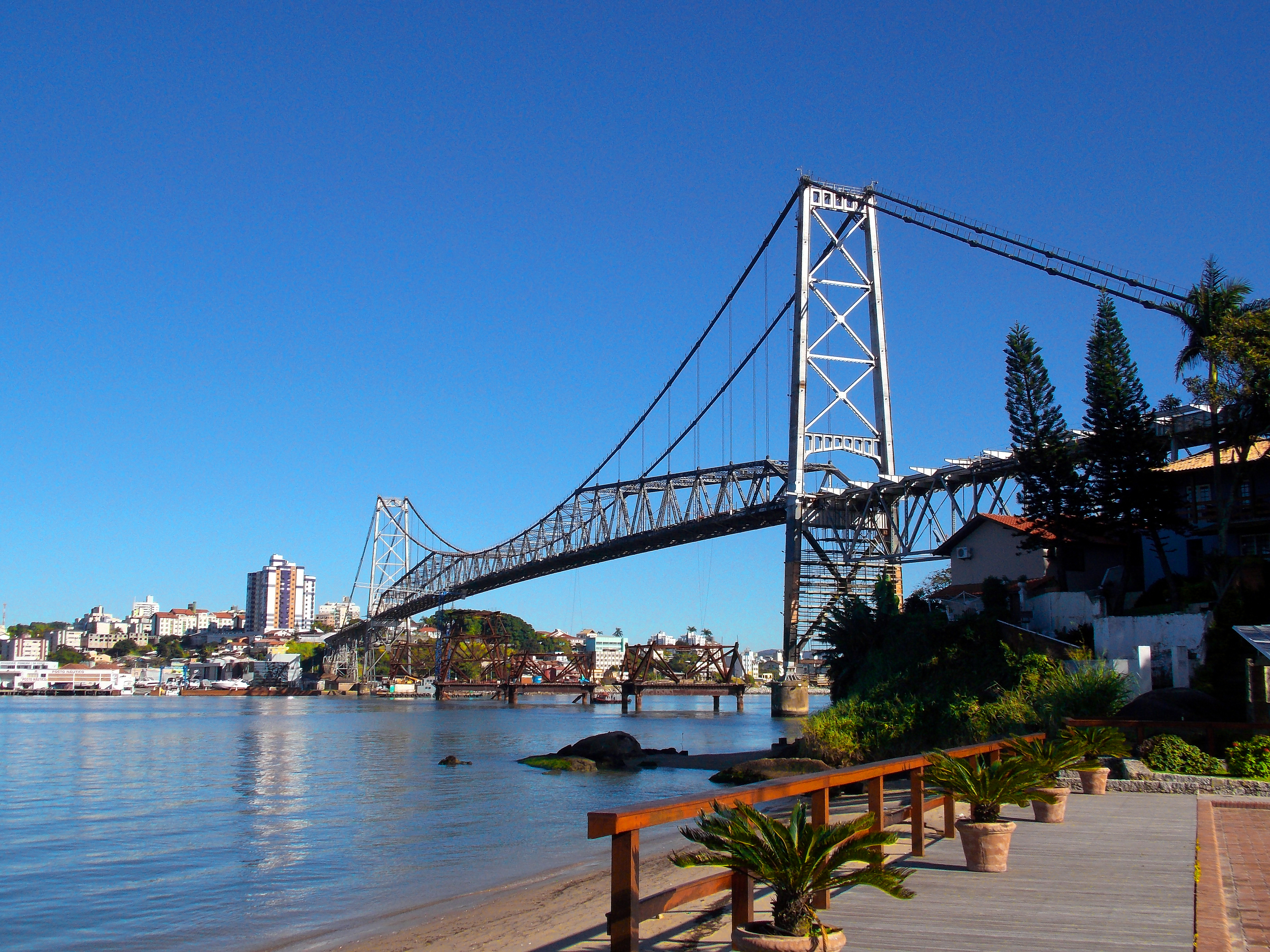
Hercilio Luz Bridge.

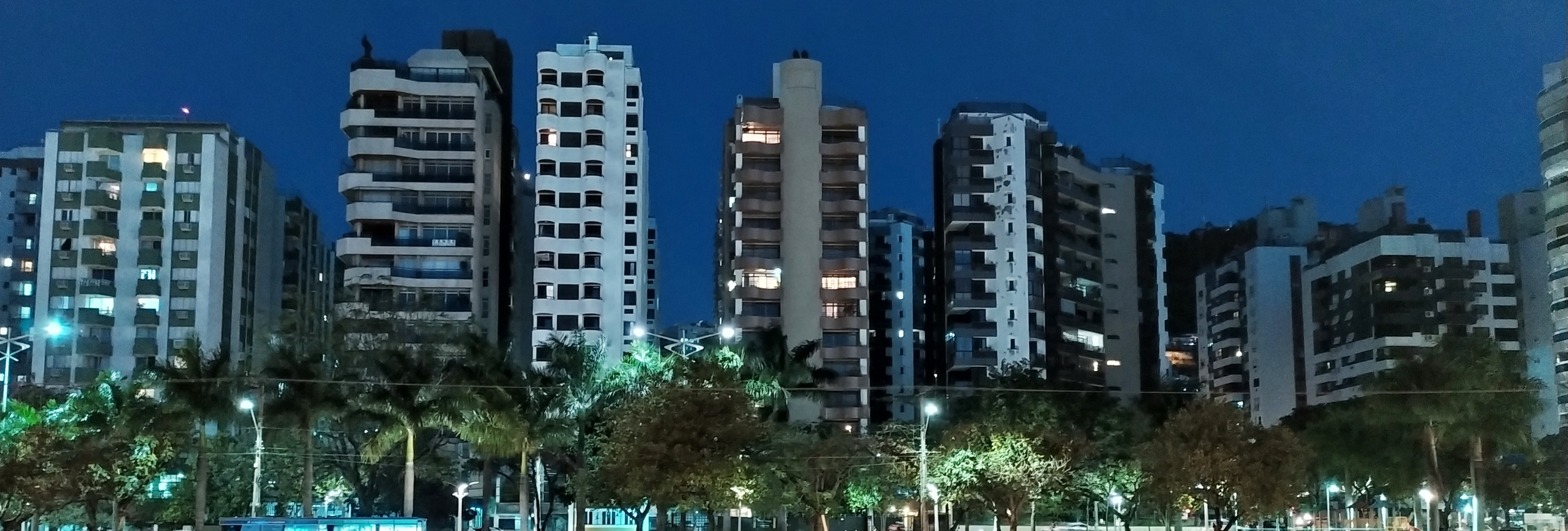
Residential buildings.

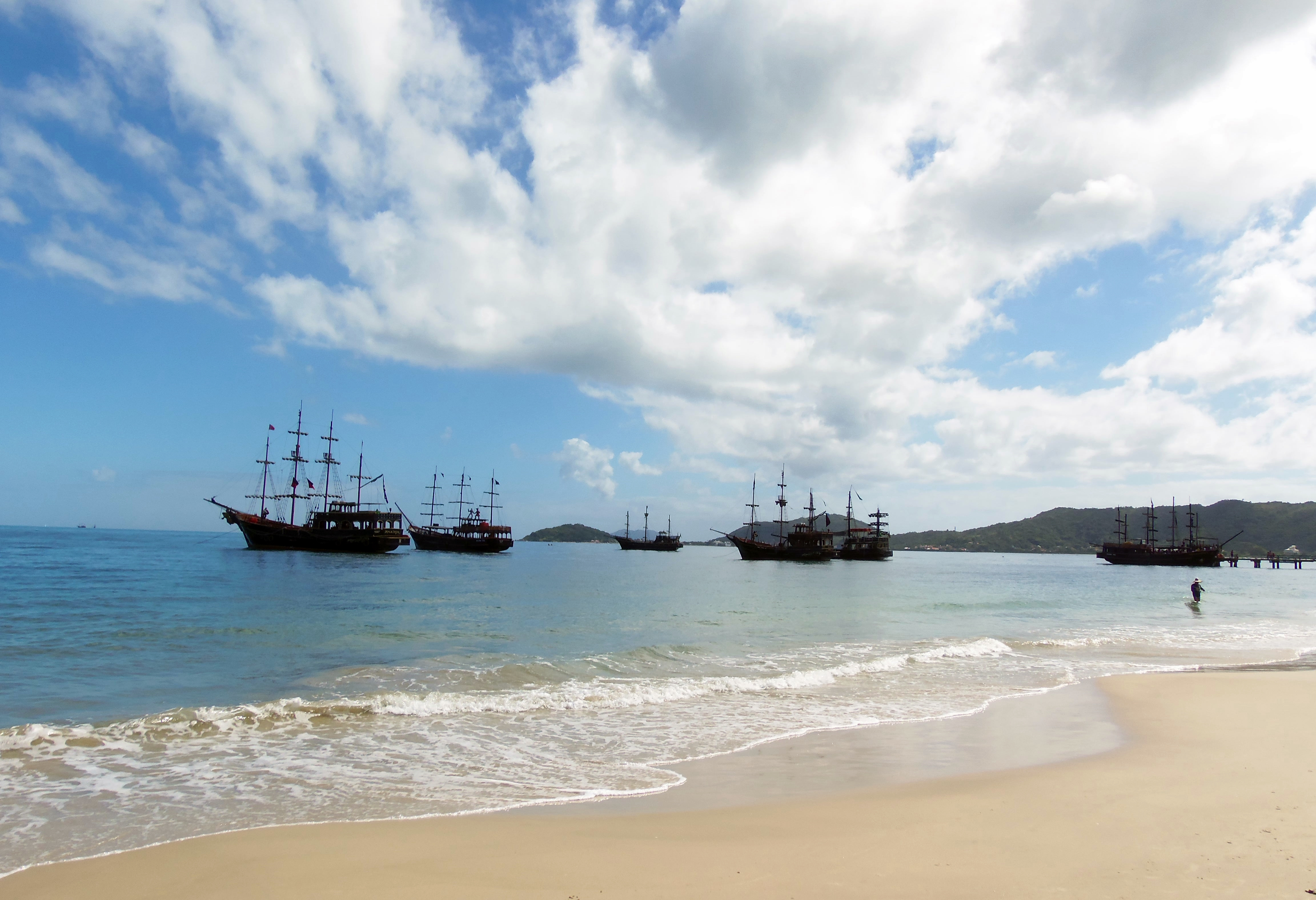
Canasvieiras.

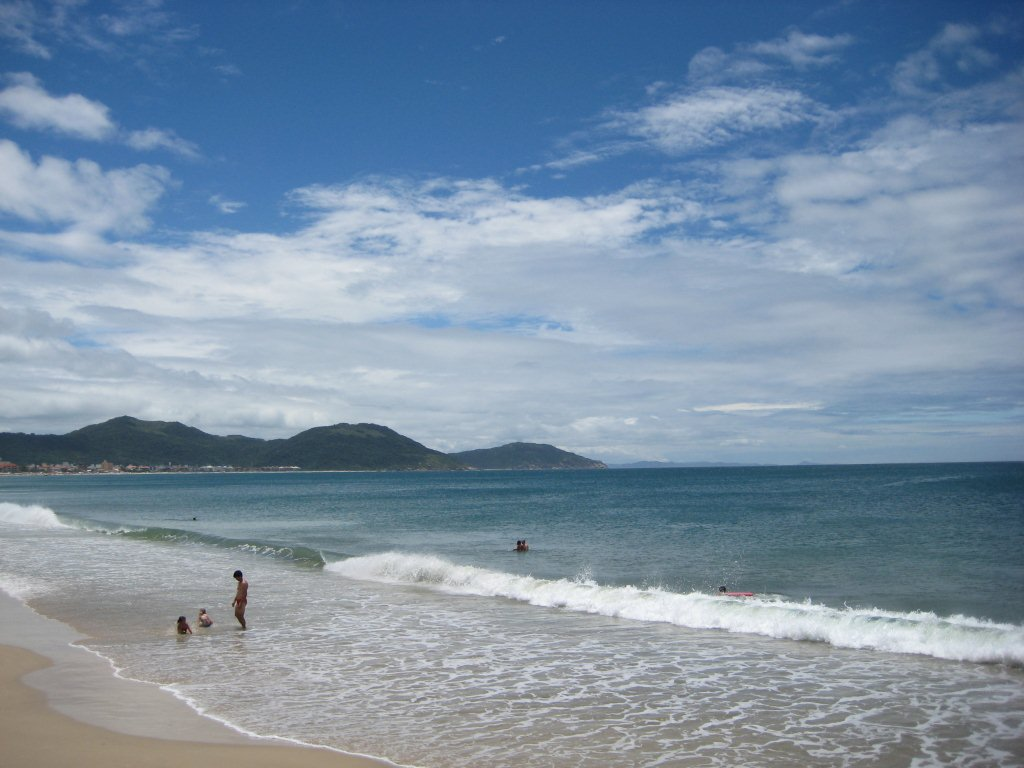
Ingleses beach.

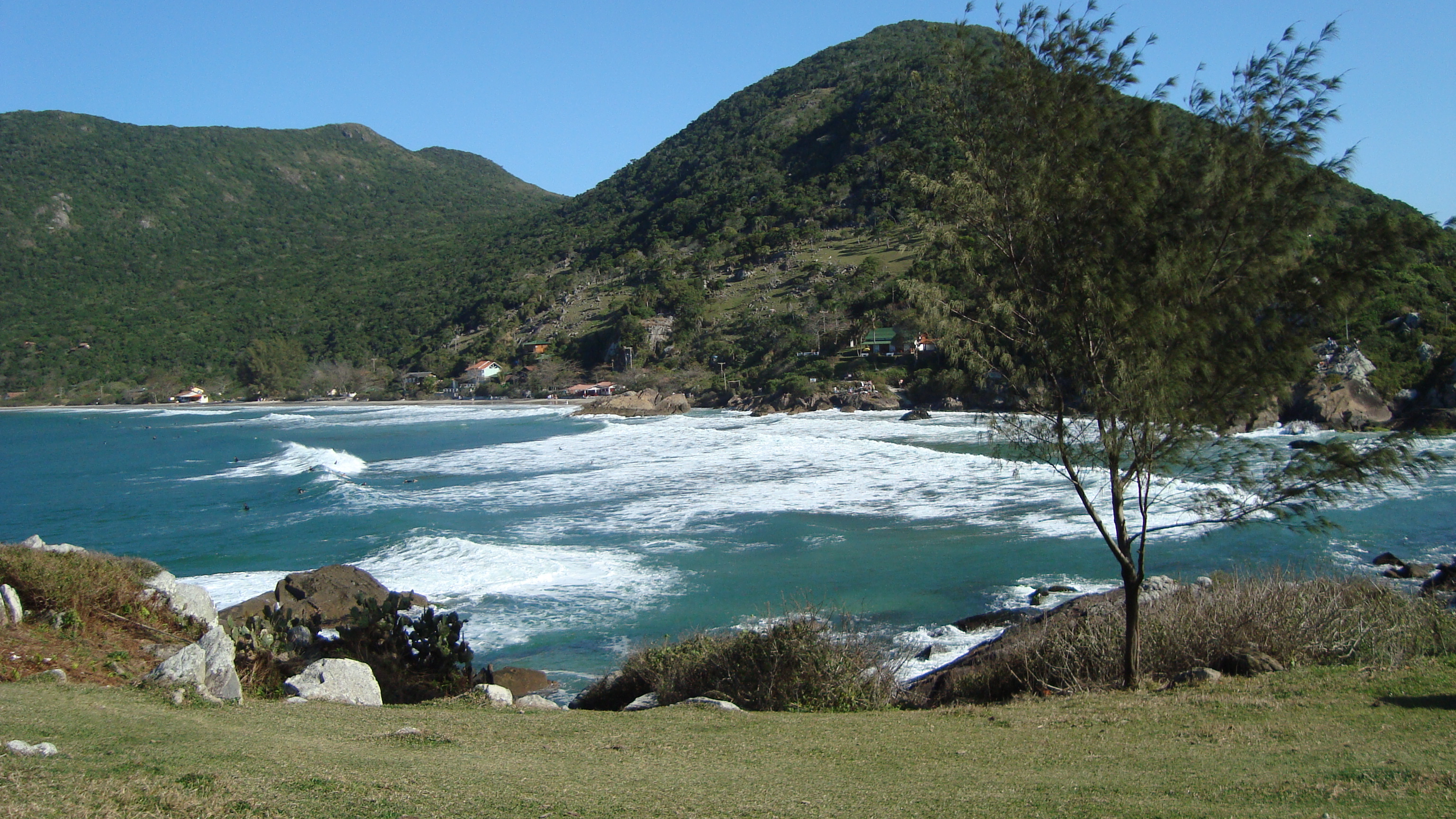
Matadeiro beach

Florianópolis is one of the most visited places in Brazil, as it is an island with 42 beaches, lagoons, and waterfalls.

=== Beaches ===
Conceição Lagoon (Lagoa da Conceição) is the largest lagoon on the Santa Catarina Island and one of the most visited areas of the island by foreign travelers and backpackers. The adjacent district of the same name has the highest concentration of restaurants, bars, organic markets, and shops. Many expats and Brazilian people from other cities choose to live by the lagoon because of its views, safety, nature, and quality of life.

The lagoon is surrounded by mountains and has a canal linking it to the ocean. The history of the region around the lagoon is a plus with all the folklore, netting tradition, old Portuguese architecture, graffiti, and an 18th-century church on the top of the hill (see panoramic view below).

The Holy Spirit Feast (Festa do Divino) is a festival that takes place 40 days after Easter. The celebration dates to the colonial era and includes a parade, music, and street food.

Mole Beach (Praia Mole) is one of the best known beaches near Conceição Lagoon and is noted for its rolling green hills and rock formations on either side. The beach is mostly known for surfing, eco-friendly lounges, and the LGBTQ scene during the summer. The beach is one of the locations for the ASP World Tour of the Association of Surfing Professionals, which classifies 50 competitors, among professionals and amateurs. The state of Santa Catarina is the only location in South America for this surfing event. Santa Catarina Art Museum is located in the city.

Joaquina Beach (Praia da Joaquina) Became well known in the 1970s, when surfers from around the world discovered its waves. Joaquina Beach is accessible from the Lagoon of Conceição. Many surf cups began to emerge, and great Catarinense surfing personalities emerged. It is one of the beaches that offers the best tourist facilities, receiving a large number of tourists from around Brazil and the world on the warm days in spring and summer. The rock complex situated to the left of the beach, the night lighting, and the public showers are some of the trademarks at Joaquina. There is a big paid parking lot, toilets, tourist coach parking lot, lifeguards, police station, handicraft shop, bars, restaurant, and hotels. Sand boards can be rented on the spot.

Barra da Lagoa Barra da Lagoa is a quaint fisherman's village. The physical characteristics of the beach make it an ideal place to learn to surf. It is a cove on the Eastern part of the island and stretches into Moçambique beach for 15 kilometres (9.3 mi). It is in a natural setting, as there are no huge hotels on the beach, and the Southern headquarters of Projeto TAMAR (Save the Turtles) is located here. Penguins swim into the canal and near the beach of Barra da Lagoa during the colder winter months of June, July, and August. The canal at Barra da Lagoa connects the Lagoa da Conceição with the open sea. It is not uncommon to see fishermen during the night tossing their nets in the lagoon to catch shrimp they sell to the fresh fish restaurants in this community.

Ingleses Beach (Praia dos Ingleses) Even though it is a beach preferred by tourists, Ingleses still keep to the traditions of the Azorian colonizers. In the summer, it is one of the top beach destinations of Argentine tourists, second only to Canasveiras. In the winter, mullet fishing, religious celebrations, and regional festivities are demonstrations of the local culture. The dunes separating the Ingleses Beach (English Beach) from the Santinho Beach are the main natural attractions. The practice of sandboarding is quite common there, with vendors renting sandboards by the dunes. Those looking for a different outing can go on a trek of 4 kilometres (2.5 mi) over the dunes.

Armação Beach (Praia da Armação) The Sant'Anna Church, built by the Armação fishing company, is part of the beach's history. It was from there that whale harpooners and crewmen confessed and attended the mass before going fishing. Next, the priest would go down to the beach to bless the boats that would sail out to sea. Today, the boats leave there for Ilha do Campeche, one of the most visited islands around Florianópolis. It is also in Armação that one finds one of the most important archaeological sites of the State of Santa Catarina. In the winter of 2010, a significant portion of the beach disappeared due to erosion. With financial aid from the Brazilian federal government, tons of large rocks were dumped on the beach to prevent houses from being destroyed.

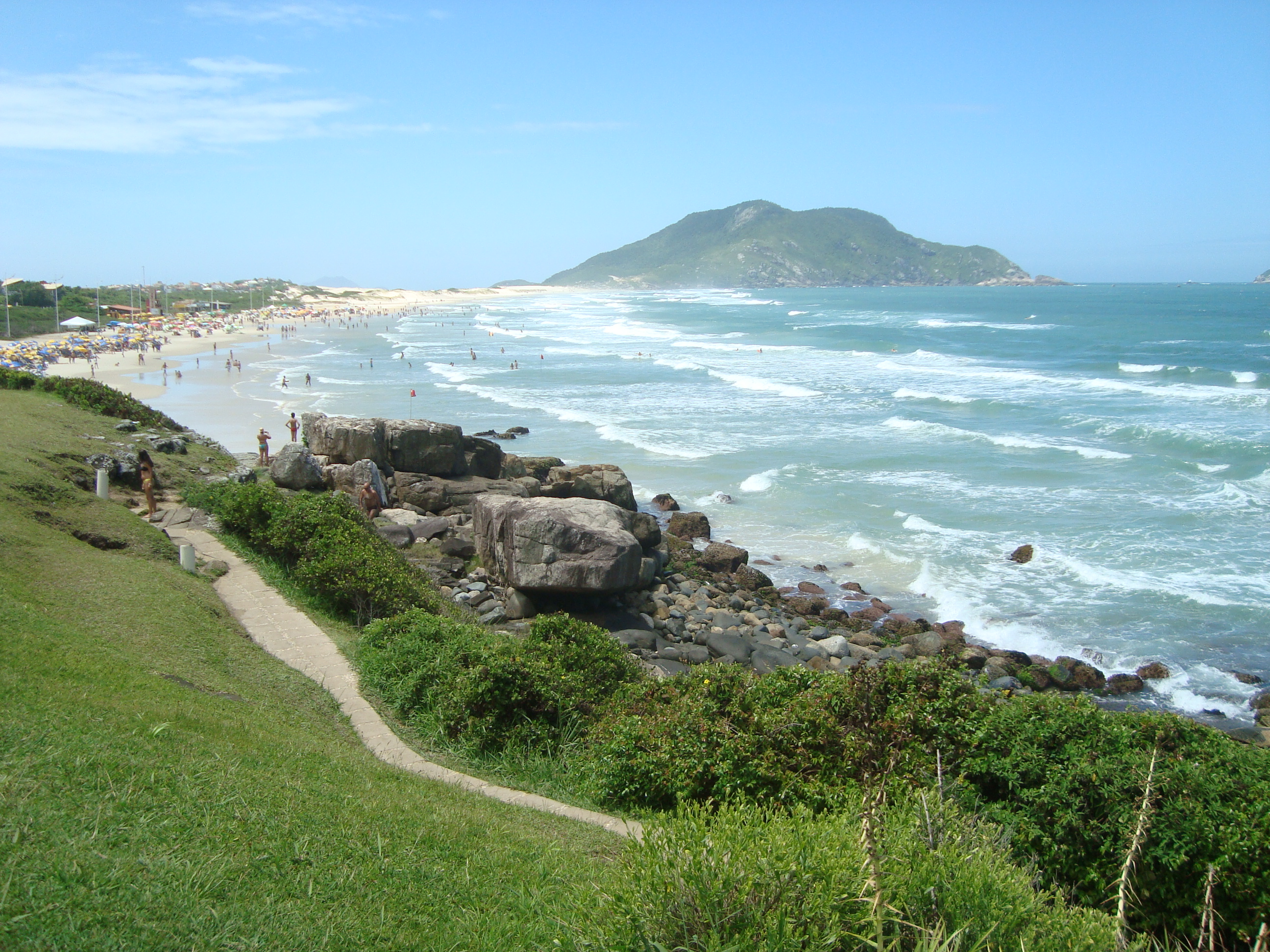
Santinho beach

Campeche Beach (Praia do Campeche) With 5 kilometres (3.1 mi) of white sands and turbulent waters, Campeche is considered the Jeffreys Bay of the Santa Catarina Island for the quality of its waves. For those who are not interested in surfing, the beach offers other attractions. At night, Campeche is also an attraction. The huge reflector illuminates part of the large sand strip in front of the bars. The illumination favours the fishermen with the production in this area.

Santinho Beach (Praia do Santinho) is mainly sought by tourists who look for nature and the location's tranquility. Surfers are the main visitors and consider Santinho to be the best beach in the North of Santa Catarina Island. It is in the left-hand corner, where bathers do not venture, that surfers practice their sport, sharing the space with fishermen. 40 kilometres (25 mi) away from the centre of Florianópolis, another attraction of this beach is the primitive inscriptions made by hunters, fishermen, and collectors inhabiting the Island five thousand years ago. The name Santinho (little saint) comes from a human figure engraved (a petroglyph) on an isolated block of rock, the Costão do Santinho.

=== Other attractions ===
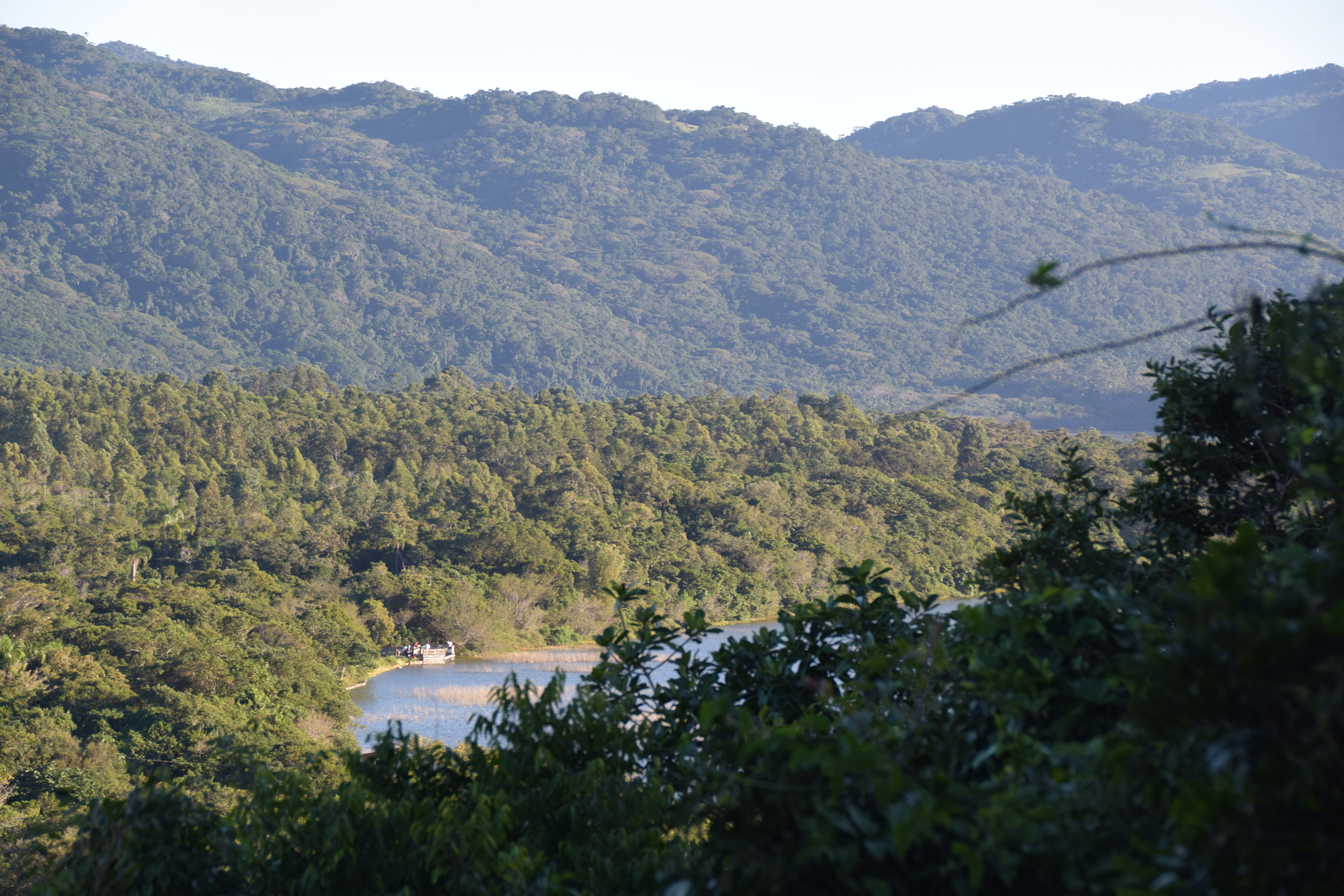
Preserved Atlantic Forest through the establishment of Conservation Units, such as Peri Lagoon

Outdoor sports, including diving, hang gliding, rowing, paragliding, and mountain biking, as well as surfing, are common on the island.

The island is connected to the Continent by three bridges. The Hercílio Luz Bridge, which was built in 1926, this bridge is 11 years older than the Golden Gate Bridge; it is a symbol of the island and often appears on postcard images. It is open to traffic along with the Colombo Sales Bridge and Pedro Ivo Bridge.

Santo Amaro da Imperatriz was the first thermal water facility in Brazil. Hotels with thermal bath facilities are located in the district of Caldas da Imperatriz and in the city of Águas Mornas. The Fonte Caldas da Imperatriz city baths are an additional source of thermal waters, which can reach the temperature of 39 °C (102 °F), where there are immersion baths and hydromassage. It is located on the Estrada Geral Highway, km 4, Caldas da Imperatriz district.

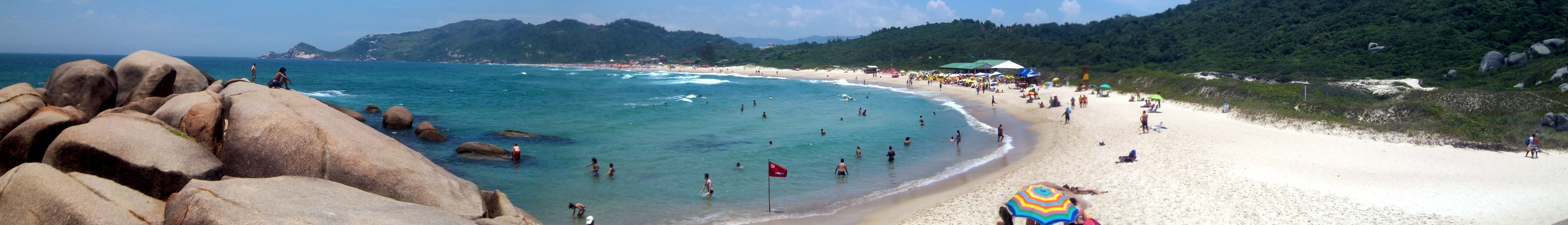
Panoramic view of Praia Mole.

== Areas of the city ==
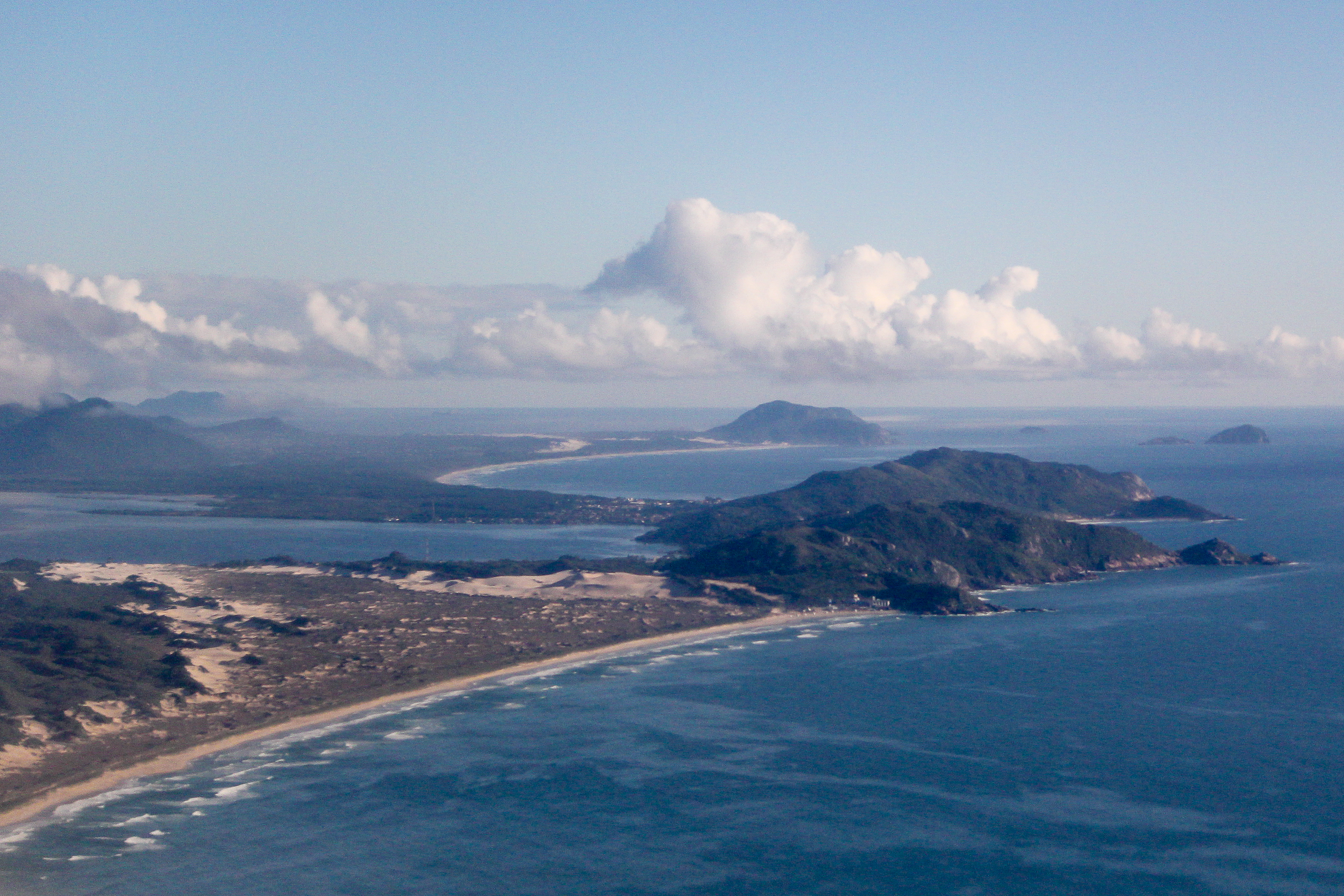
Santa Catarina Island seen from east.

The centre of Florianópolis, with its alleys, rows of typical houses, churches, and museums, includes many examples of colonial architecture. Among these are the Palácio Cruz e Sousa, formerly the Governor's residence, now restored to house the Santa Catarina Museum, renamed in honour of Cruz e Sousa, homegrown poet, journalist and founder of Brazil's Symbolist movement; the Mercado Público de Florianópolis (Public Market since 1898), a colourful nexus of food vendors and local handicrafts in the shade of hundred-year-old fig trees. Close to the centre is the house where Victor Meirelles was born, one of the authors who devised the first Catholic mass spoken in Brazil. The building is registered by the Institute of Historical and Artistic Heritage and houses the Victor Meirelles Museum.

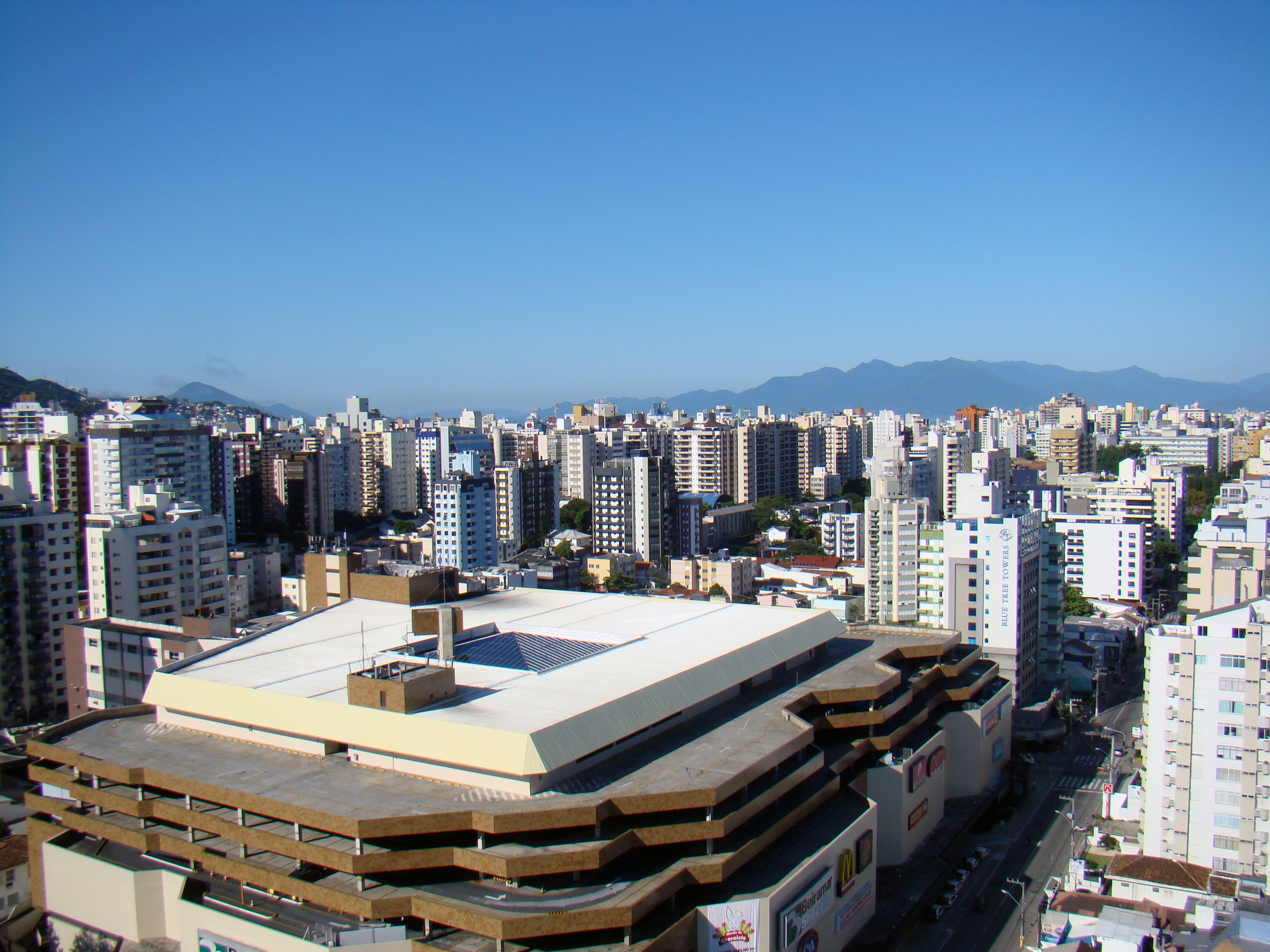
View of Florianópolis downtown

The north of the island is most visited by tourists and consequently, it bustles with the best services and visitor infrastructure. In some quarters, there is a strong influence on the population's architecture and customs. Lifelong residents of Florianópolis, especially the older generation, retain the heritage left by immigrants from Portuguese islands from Azores, in the way they speak, in their artistry and craftwork and in a busy calendar of festivals. The south of the island is less busy but preserves the intensely Azorean customs that arrived in Santa Catalina throughout the 18th century.

The Carijós Ecological Station was established by Decree Number 94656, of 20 July 1987, covering an area of 7.5933 square kilometres (2.9318 sq mi) in the municipality. It preserves a significant area of mangroves on the Ilha de Santa Catarina. The Pirajubaé Marine Extractive Reserve in the south bay of the Ilha de Santa Catarina protects people engaged in traditional harvesting of marine resources, mainly shellfish, from the sandbanks of the bay.

== Transportation ==
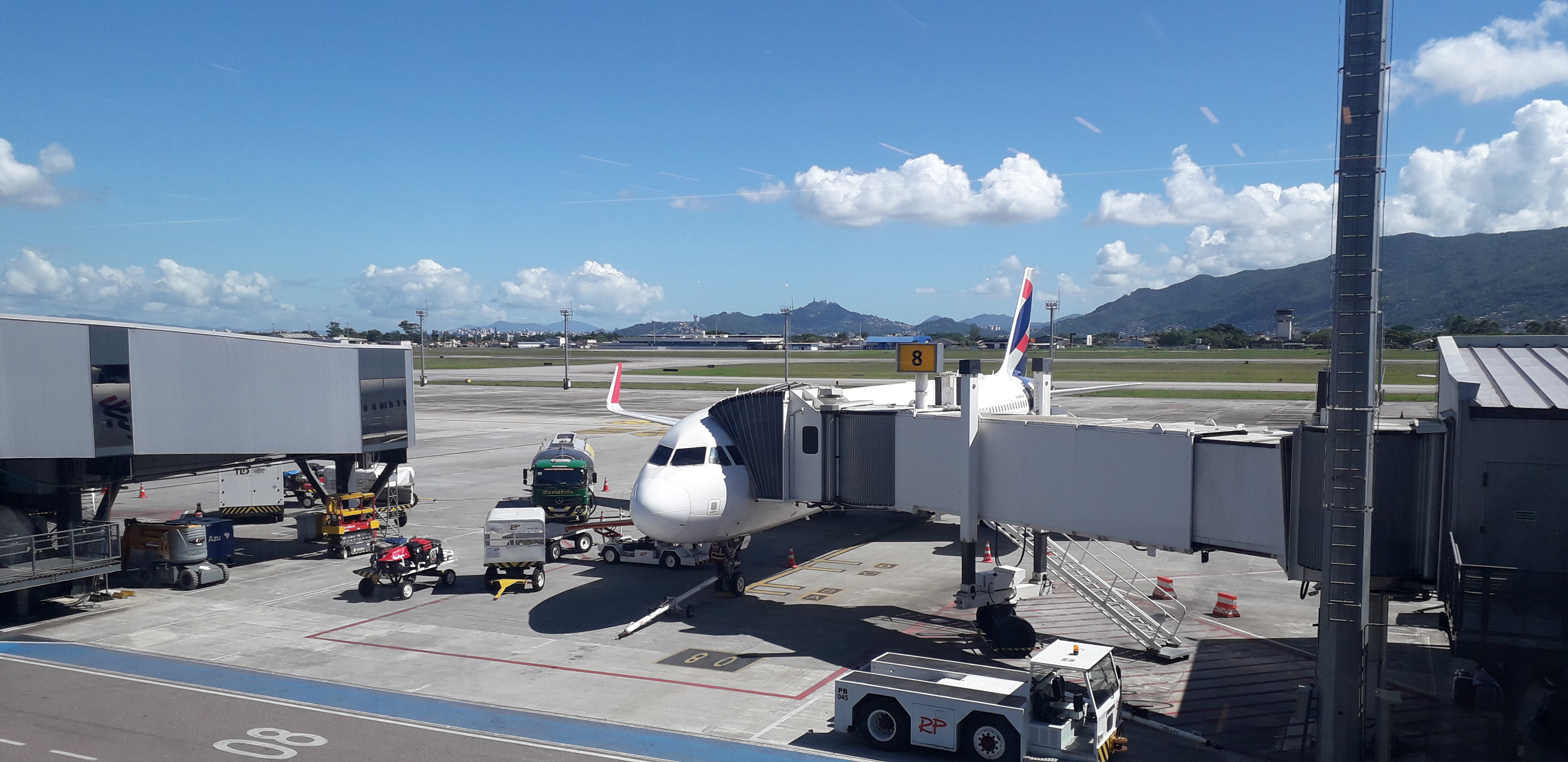
Florianópolis Hercílio Luz Airport

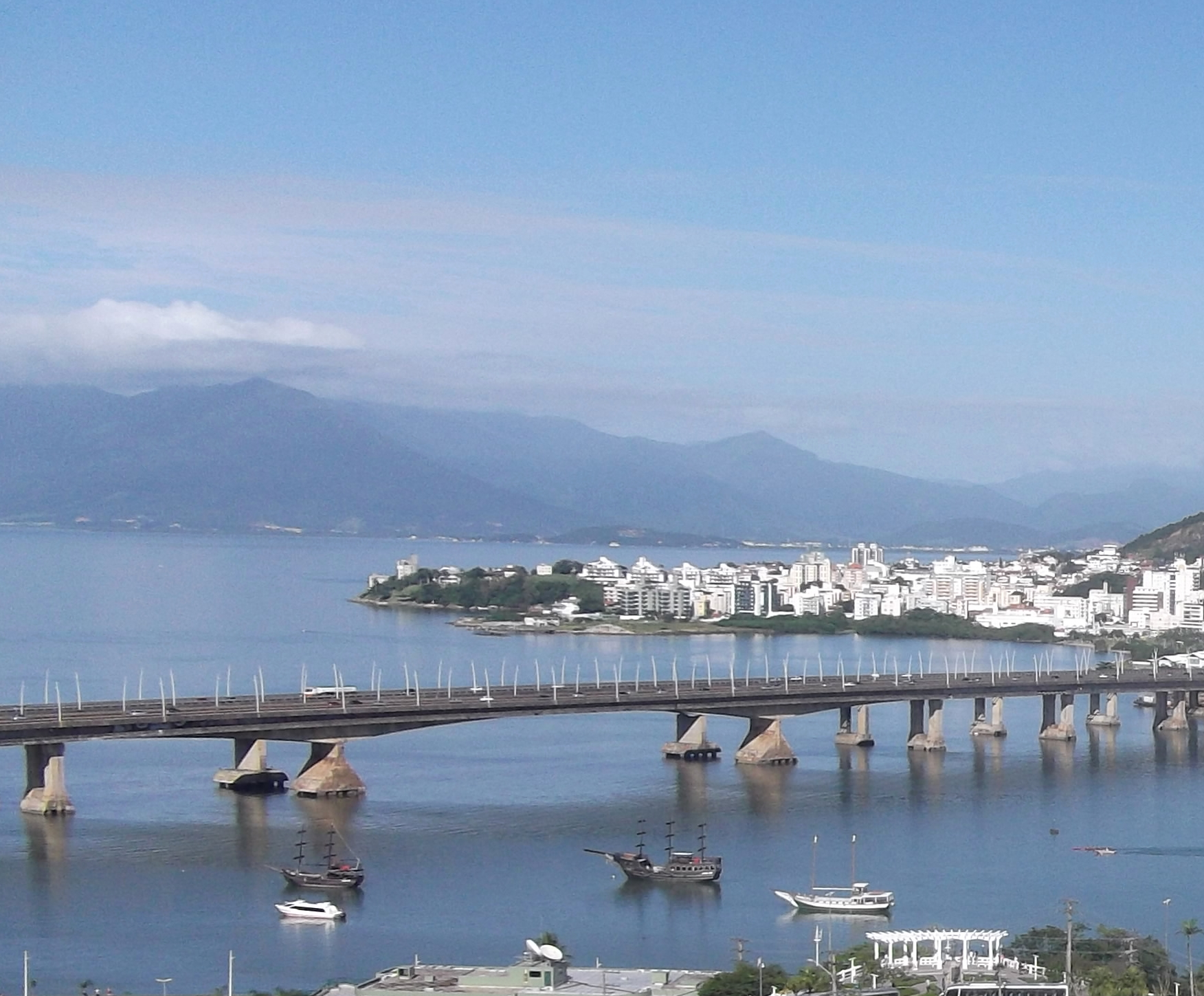
Colombo Salles Bridge.

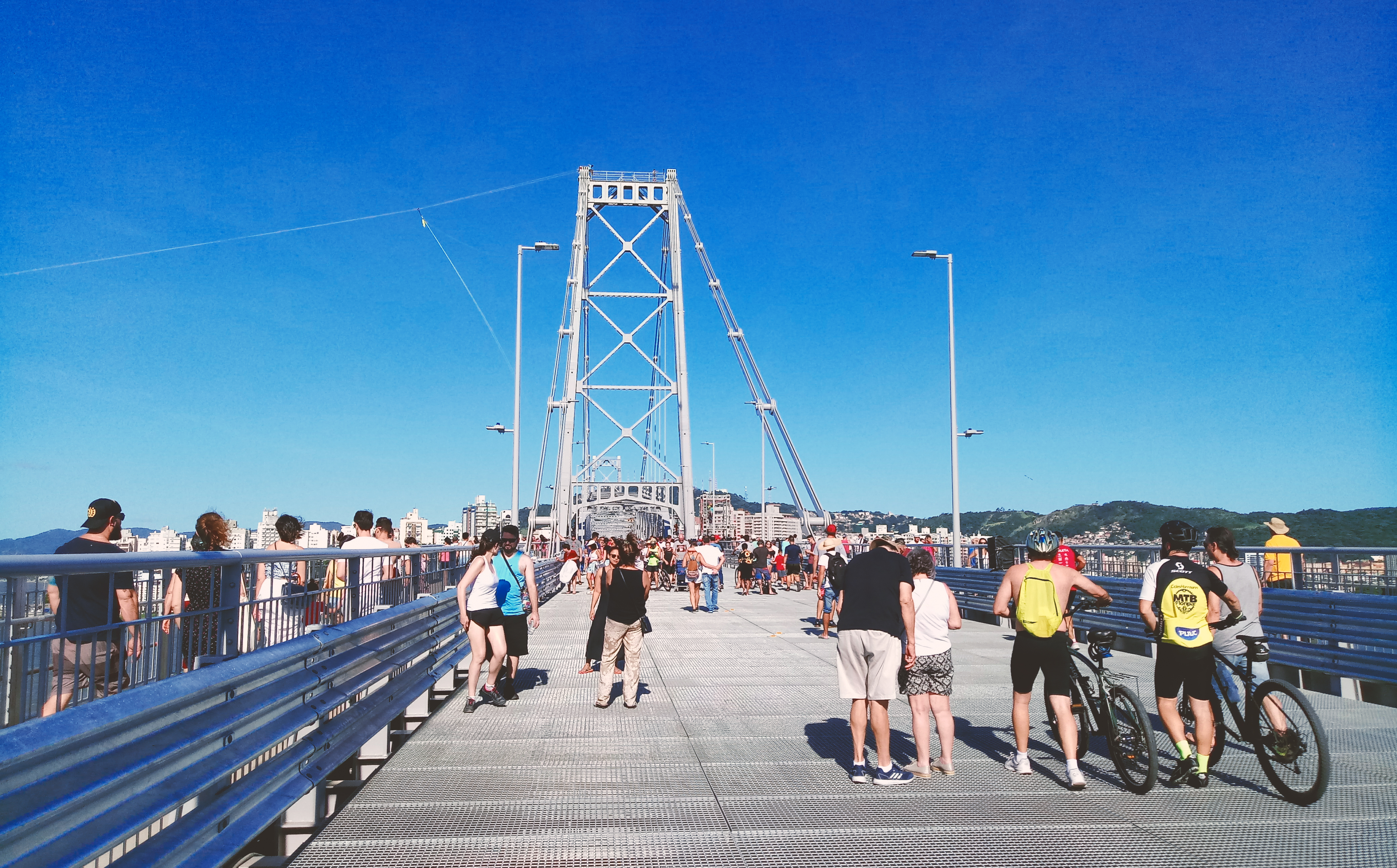
Hercílio Luz Bridge.

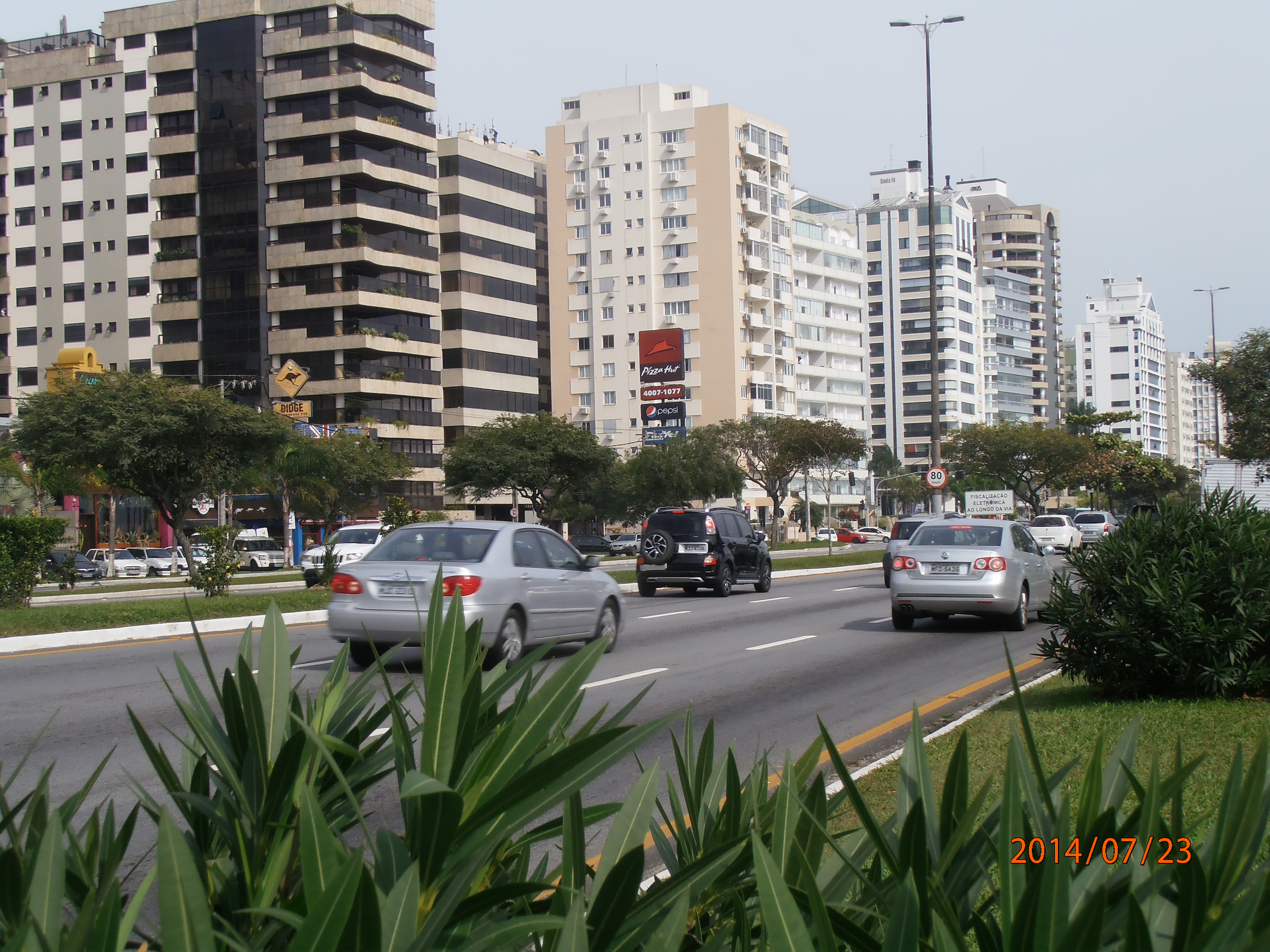
Beira Mar Avenue.

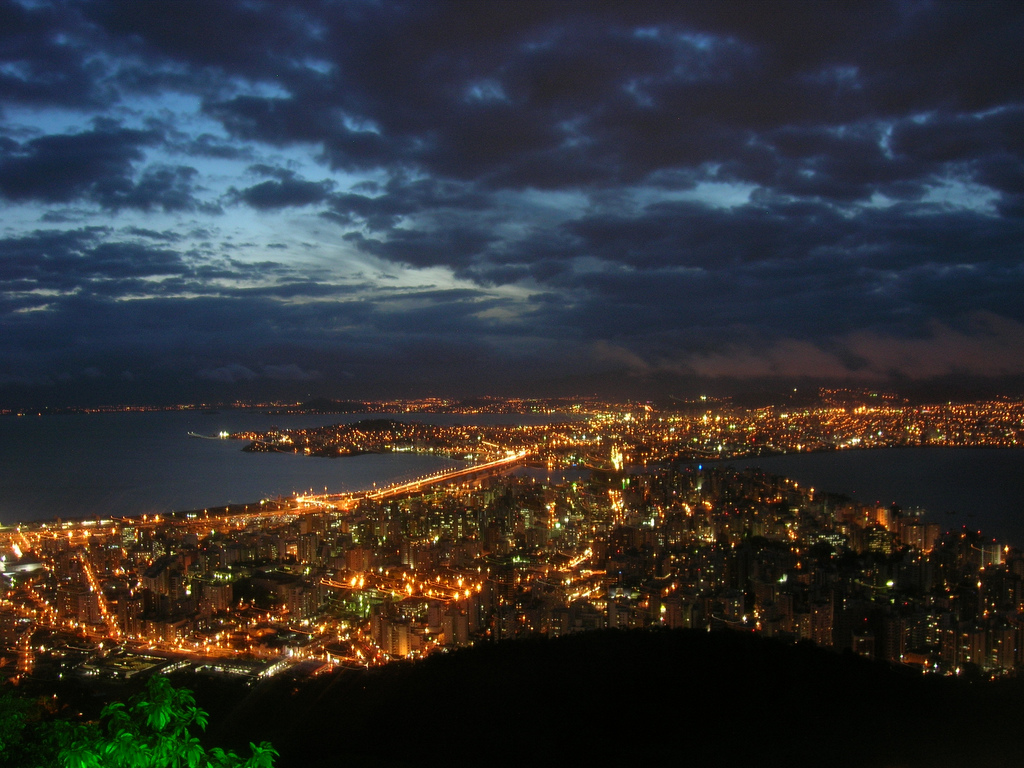
Florianópolis at night.

=== International airport ===
Florianópolis is served by Hercílio Luz International Airport for both domestic and international flights.

It is one of the leading airports in Brazil for charter flights, especially during the summer months and from destinations such as Santiago, Montevideo, Buenos Aires and Córdoba, besides domestic routes. The traffic has grown significantly at the airport, and therefore, the city plans to upgrade and expand the airport so that 2.7 million passengers can be accommodated annually.

The architectural design of the expansion was chosen by a public competition held by Infraero in partnership with the Brazilian Architects Institute (IAB). Among the over 150 original entries, the proposal of São Paulo architect Mário Bizelli was chosen. Normally, the projects for expansion and modernization of the 66 airports administered by Infraero are done by public tender based on the needs, criteria, and conditions presented by the company's engineering area.

The privatization of Hercílio Luz International Airport resulted in the inauguration of the new passenger terminal in October 2019, which replaced the previous terminal from the 1970s, which was deactivated. As a result, the airport capacity grew from 1 million passengers to 3.5 million passengers a year in the new and modern passenger terminal.

=== Air Force Base ===
Florianópolis Air Force Base - BAFL, a base of the Brazilian Air Force, is located in Florianópolis. The Air Base also hosts the Florianópolis Airspace Control Detachment and the Florianópolis Health Squadron. The Florianópolis Air Space Control Detachment is responsible for controlling the aircraft that cross, arrive, or leave the capital of the state of Santa Catarina, as well as for the production and dissemination of meteorological and aeronautical information, using a wide range of equipment. Detection and communications, in addition to specialized and qualified personnel. The Florianópolis Health Squadron has the mission of providing health care with excellence, carrying out preventive, assistance, forensic actions and supporting the operational activities carried out at the Florianópolis Air Force Garrison.

=== Highways ===
Florianópolis is connected to the main cities of Brazil:

- From the cities of São Paulo and Rio de Janeiro: BR-116/ BR-376/ BR-101/ BR-282;
- From Curitiba: BR-376/ BR-101/ BR-282;
- From Porto Alegre: BR-290/ BR-101/ BR-282.

=== Bus terminal (connecting to other cities) ===
Rita Maria is the city's main bus terminal, located by the Pedro Ivo Campos Bridge, on the island, serving ten thousand people daily, which can reach up to fifteen thousand during the summer season. The bus terminal connects Florianópolis to most cities, towns, and villages of Santa Catarina, and to the main cities in the South, Southeast, and Central-West regions of Brazil. As an international bus terminal, residents and tourists alike use Rita Maria also to reach Argentina, Paraguay, Uruguay and Chile.

=== Bus terminal (within the city) ===
Numerous bus terminals link the neighborhoods of Florianópolis.

- TICAN (Canasvieras) serves the northern beach towns on the island
- TISAN (Santo Antônio de Lisboa) serves the northwestern part of the island
- TICEN (Centro) is in the downtown area and has the most bus traffic. It serves all areas of the island and the mainland
- TITRI (Trindade) is a connector in the northern area around downtown, serving the west coast of the island
- TILAG (Lagoa) is a terminal that connects users to the eastern beach areas and the district of Lagoa da Conceição
- TIRIO (Rio Tavares) connects users to the southern area of the island

=== Cycleway ===
Pedala Floripa project is a university pro-bicycle program developed by the CICLOBRASIL group in the State University of Santa Catarina. The project aims to provide bicycle infrastructure projects and promote bicycle use for leisure and transport in the city.

=== Distances ===
- Brasília: 1,673 kilometres (1,040 mi);
- Rio de Janeiro: 1,145 kilometres (711 mi);
- São Paulo: 700 kilometres (430 mi);
- Porto Alegre: 466 kilometres (290 mi);
- Curitiba: 300 kilometres (190 mi).
- Montevideo: 1,253 kilometres (779 miles);
- Asunción: 1,264 kilometres (785 miles);
- Buenos Aires: 1,753 kilometres (1,089 miles)

== Neighborhoods ==
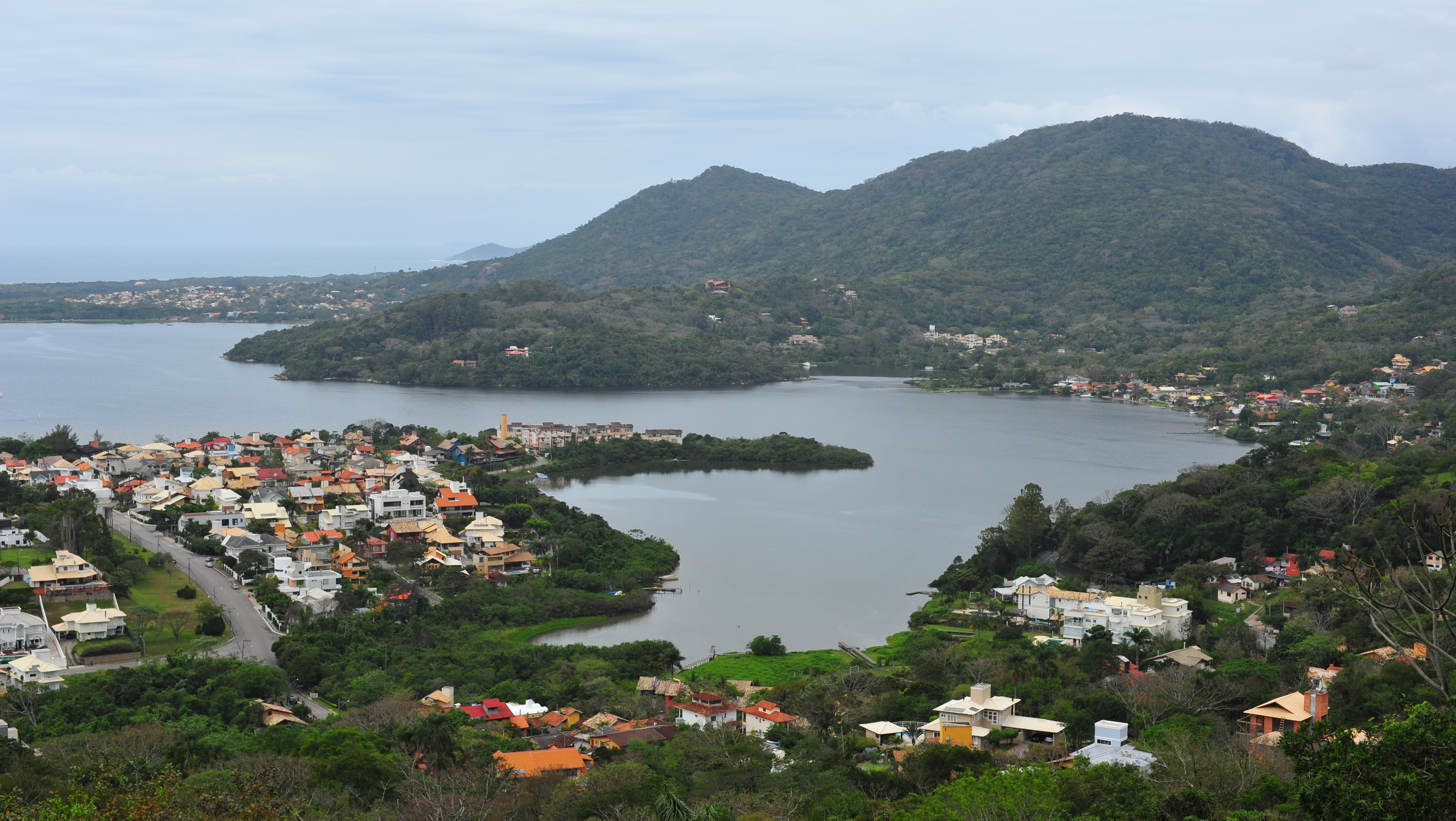
Lagoa da Conceição seen from South.

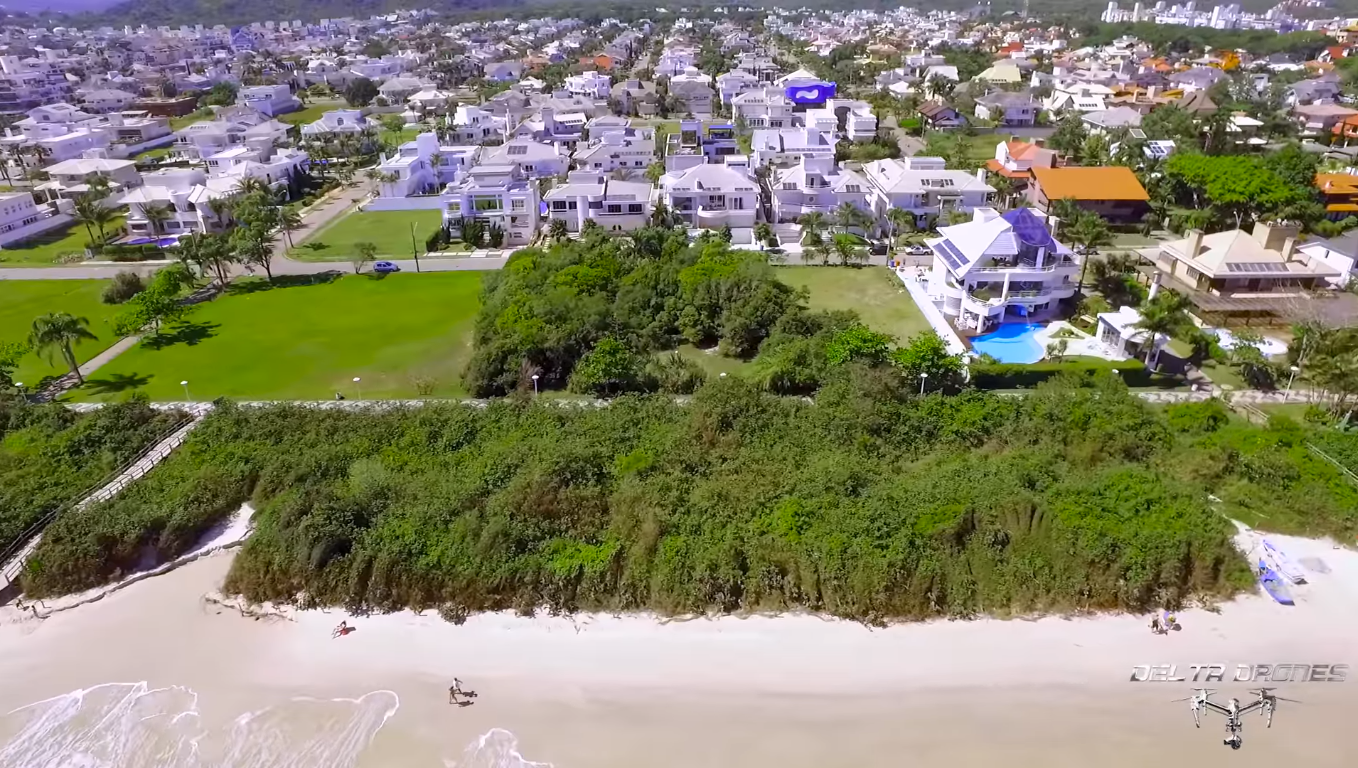
Luxury houses in Jurerê Internacional.

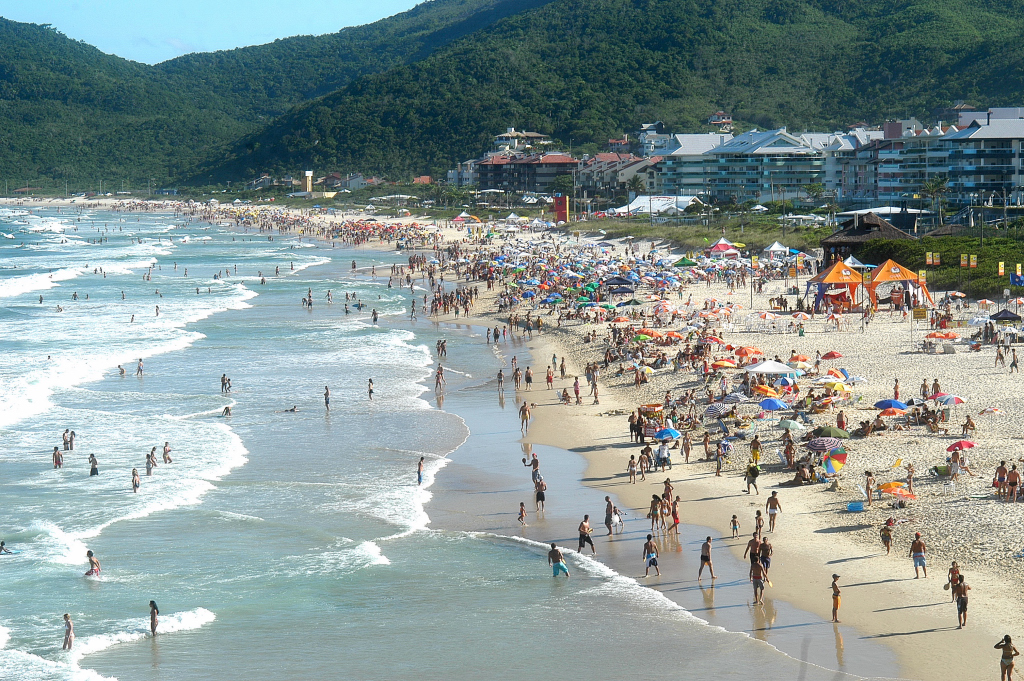
Praia Brava in the North of the Island.

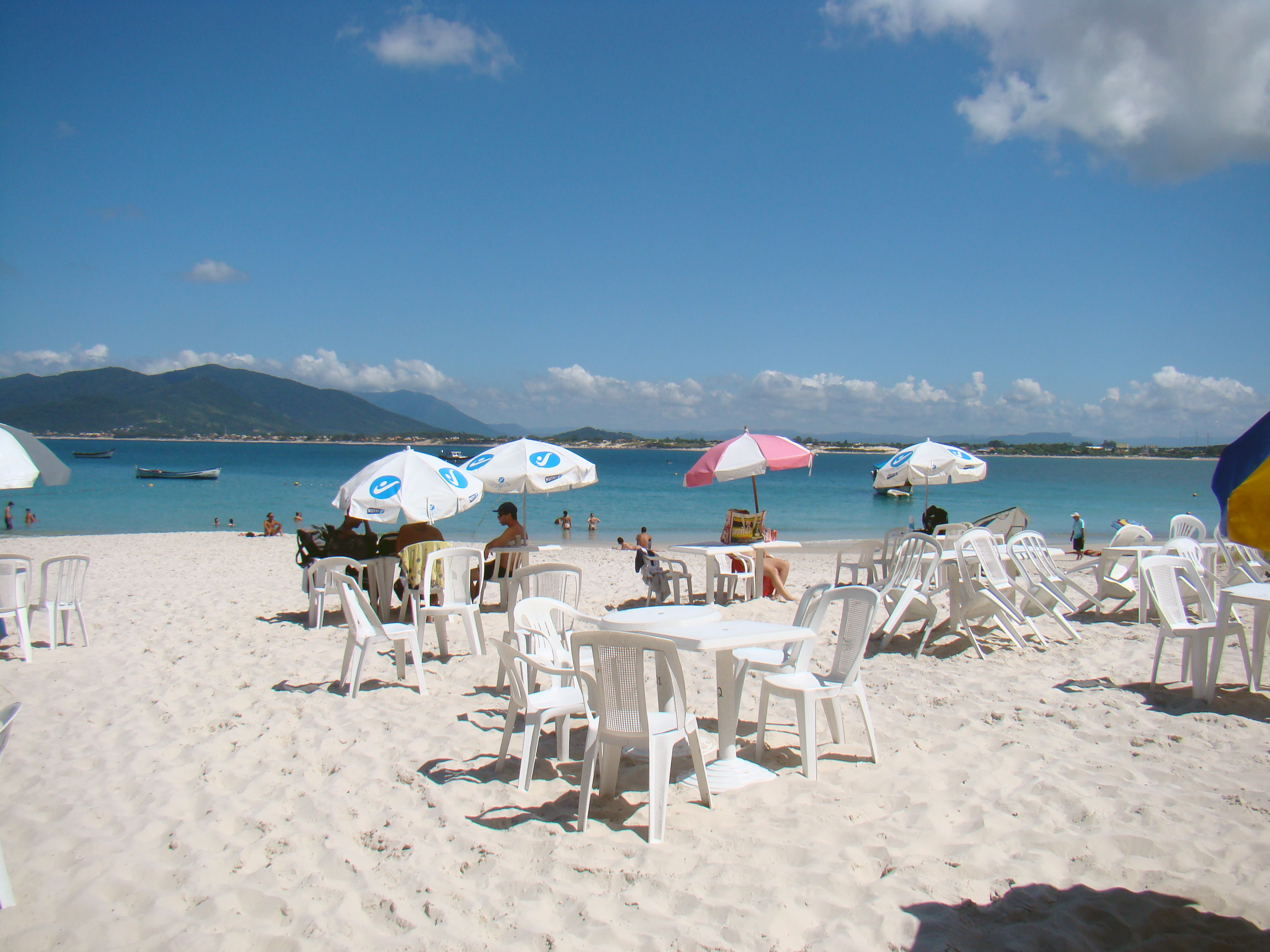
Campeche Island

There are more than 40 neighborhoods in Florianópolis:

- Abraão
- Agronômica
- Barra da Lagoa
- Bom Abrigo
- Cachoeira do Bom Jesus
- Cacupé
- Campeche
- Canasvieiras
- Canto da Lagoa
- Capoeiras
- Carianos
- Carvoeira
- Centro
- Chácara do Espanha
- Chácara do Molenda
- Coqueiros
- Córrego Grande
- Costa da Lagoa
- Costa de Dentro
- Costeira do Pirajubaé
- Estreito
- Ingleses do Rio Vermelho
- Itacorubi
- Itaguaçu
- Jardim Atlântico
- João Paulo
- José Mendes
- Jurerê Internacional
- Jurerê
- Lagoa da Conceição
- Moçambique
- Monte Verde
- Morro das Pedras
- Pantanal
- Pântano do Sul
- Parque São Jorge
- Ponta das Canas
- Praia Brava
- Prainha
- Ratones
- Rio Vermelho
- Ribeirão da Ilha
- Saco dos Limões
- Saco Grande
- Sambaqui
- Santa Mônica
- Santo Antônio de Lisboa
- Tapera
- Trindade
- Vargem do Bom Jesus
- Vargem Grande.

== Sports ==
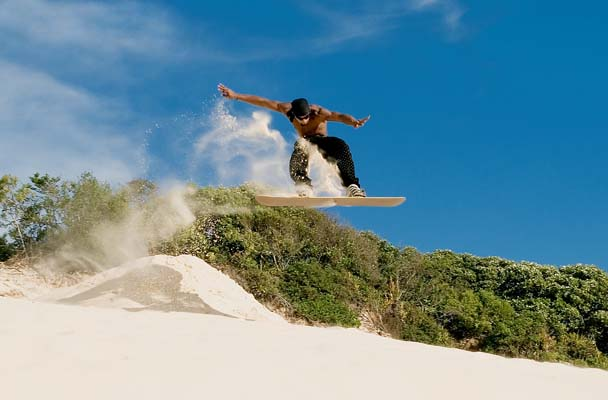
A sandboarder does a jump on Florianópolis dunes.

There are two professional football teams in the city. The derby between them is known as "O Clássico da Capital" ("The Capital's Derby"), or simply "O Clássico" (The Derby).

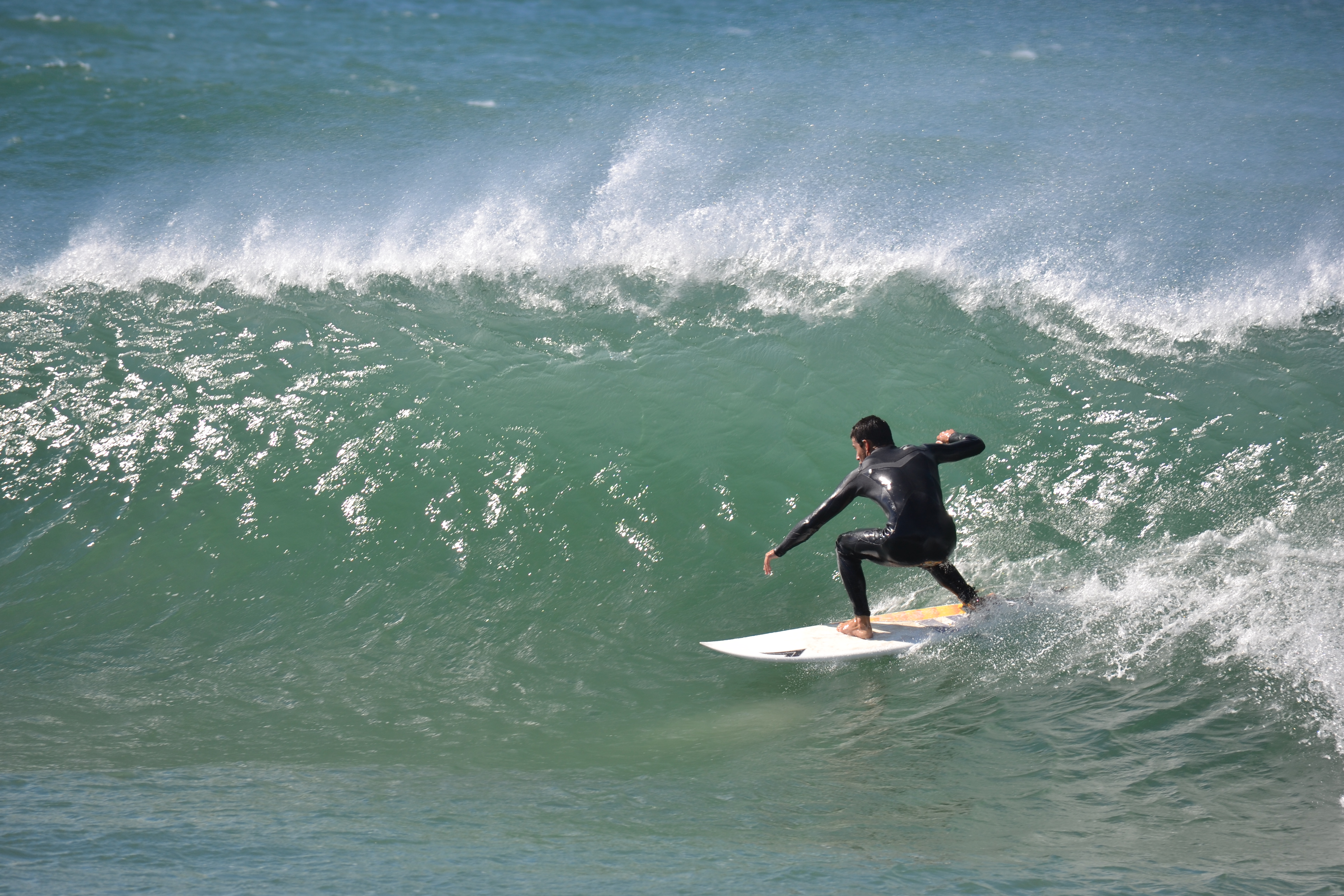
Surfer at the Morro das Pedras beach.

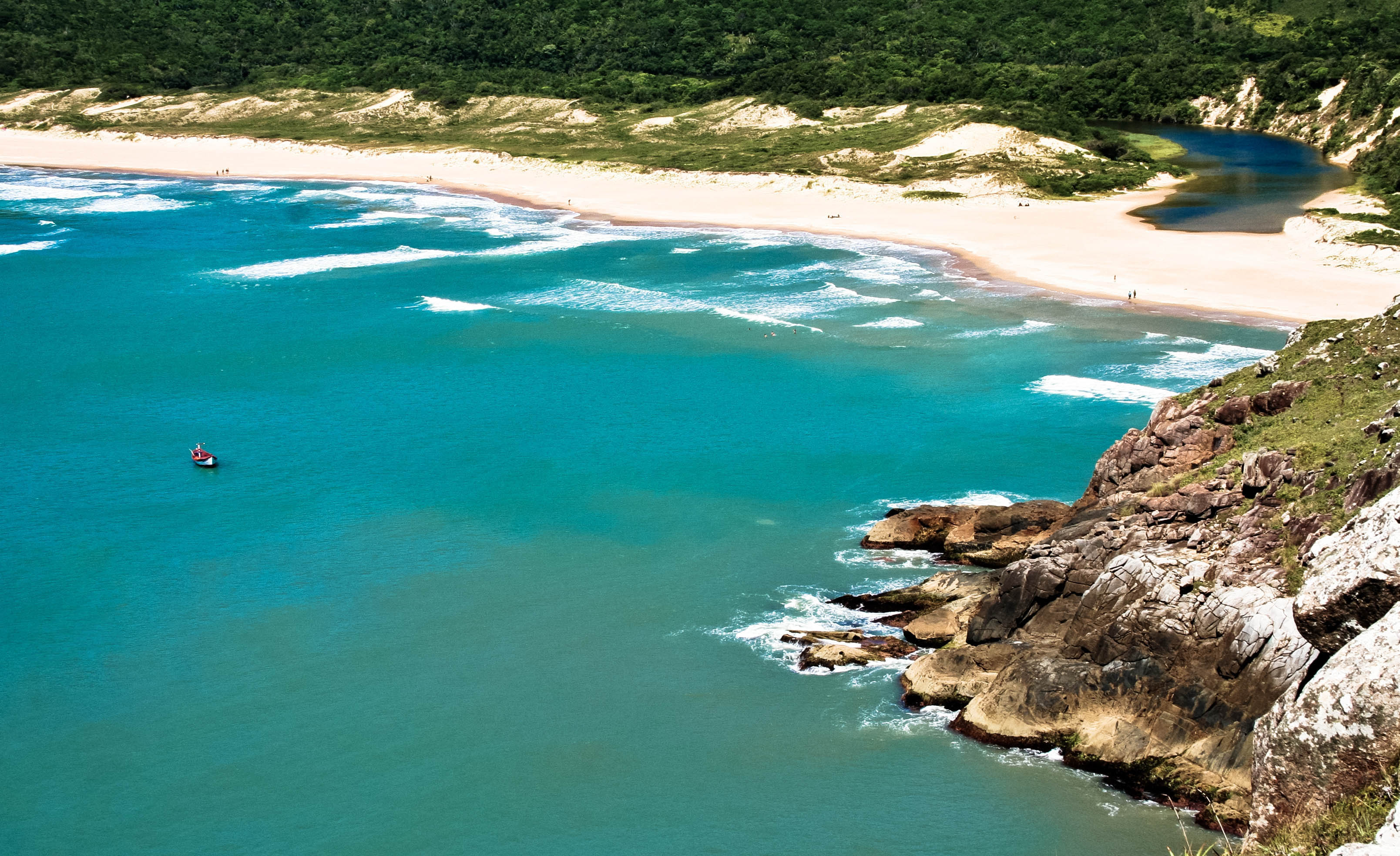
Trail in the Lagoinha do Leste.

Avaí FC – blue and white. It is also known as Leão da Ilha ("Lion of the Island"). Its stadium is the Aderbal Ramos da Silva, popularly known as Ressacada, located in the Carianos neighborhood, in the southern part of the island. Avaí plays in Campeonato Brasileiro Série B, Brazil's national second division, and holds 18 State Championship titles.

Figueirense FC – black and white. Its nickname is Figueira and it is also known as O Furacão do Estreito. Its stadium is the Orlando Scarpelli, located in the Estreito neighborhood, in the continental part of the city. Figueirense plays in Campeonato Brasileiro Série C, the Brazilian national third division. The team has won the Santa Catarina State Championship 18 times.

Desterro Rugby Clube has male and female rugby teams competing in the Brasil Super 10 (Men's 15s) and the Super 7s (women's 7s).

Florianópolis, since the beginning of the 20th century, has had a tradition in rowing. By the middle of that century, the sport was growing in Brazil, and the city had a big influence on it. But, with the decline of the sport in the country by the late 1980s, the investment slowed, and today there is almost none. But it is still served with three schools, Riachuelo Remo, Martinelli Remo, and Aldo Luz Remo, with all three being placed between Hercílio Luz Bridge, Colombo Salles Bridge, and Pedro Ivo Campos Bridge. Since the beginning of 2008, the sport has been experiencing a rapid growth in the number of rowers, even with people flocking from other cities to experience Floripa's rowing.

Florianópolis is the hometown of tennis player Gustavo Kuerten. There are various opportunities to practice yoga in Florianopolis with studios that host international yoga retreats and provide teacher-training courses. Sandboarding is possible in the sand dunes near Joaquina Beach. Kitesurfing and Windsurfing are possible in the Conceição lagoon.

The island is generally considered to be blessed with the best and most consistent Surfing waves in Brazil, and in early November of each year hosts what is South America's only Association of Surfing Professionals World Championship Tour professional surfing competition. Brazil has played host to many an ASP tour event over the past 30 years. Former contest sites include Rio de Janeiro, Barra de Tijuca, and Saquarema, but the past four years have seen the tour set up shop in Florianópolis.

Falling towards the end of the tour, the past few years have seen several ASP world champions crowned in Brazil. In 2004, it was Andy Irons, and in 2005 it was Kelly Slater (who had his 2006 ASP World Title already stitched up by Brazil).

== Notable people ==
- Protógenes Guimarães (1876-1938), admiral and politician
- Adhemar Grijó Filho (1931-2020), swimmer and water polo player
- Denison Cabral (born 1974), footballer and coach
- Fernando Scherer, swimmer (born 1974), Olympic bronze medalist and world champion
- Gustavo Kuerten or Guga (born 1976), tennis player, three-time Roland Garros champion and world n.1
- Eliza Joenck (born 1982), model and actress
- Fabiana Beltrame (born 1982), rower, world champion
- Rudnei (born 1984), football player
- Guilherme Siqueira (born 1986), football player
- Pedro Barros (born 1995), skateboarder, Olympic silver medalist, and world champion
- Allan (born 2004), football player
- Gabriel Gomez (born 2006), racing driver

== Consular representations ==
The following countries have consular representations in Florianópolis:

- Argentina (Consulate)
- Uruguay (Consulate-General)

== Twin towns – sister cities ==
Florianópolis is twinned with:

- Angra do Heroísmo, Portugal
- Asunción, Paraguay
- Constitución, Chile
- Córdoba, Argentina
- Fernando de la Mora, Paraguay
- Havana, Cuba
- Luján, Argentina
- Ponta Delgada, Portugal
- Praia da Vitória, Portugal
- Presidente Franco, Paraguay
- Roanoke, United States
