= Charitas =

Neighbourhood of Niterói, Brazil

Coordinates: 22.92804°S 43.09525°W

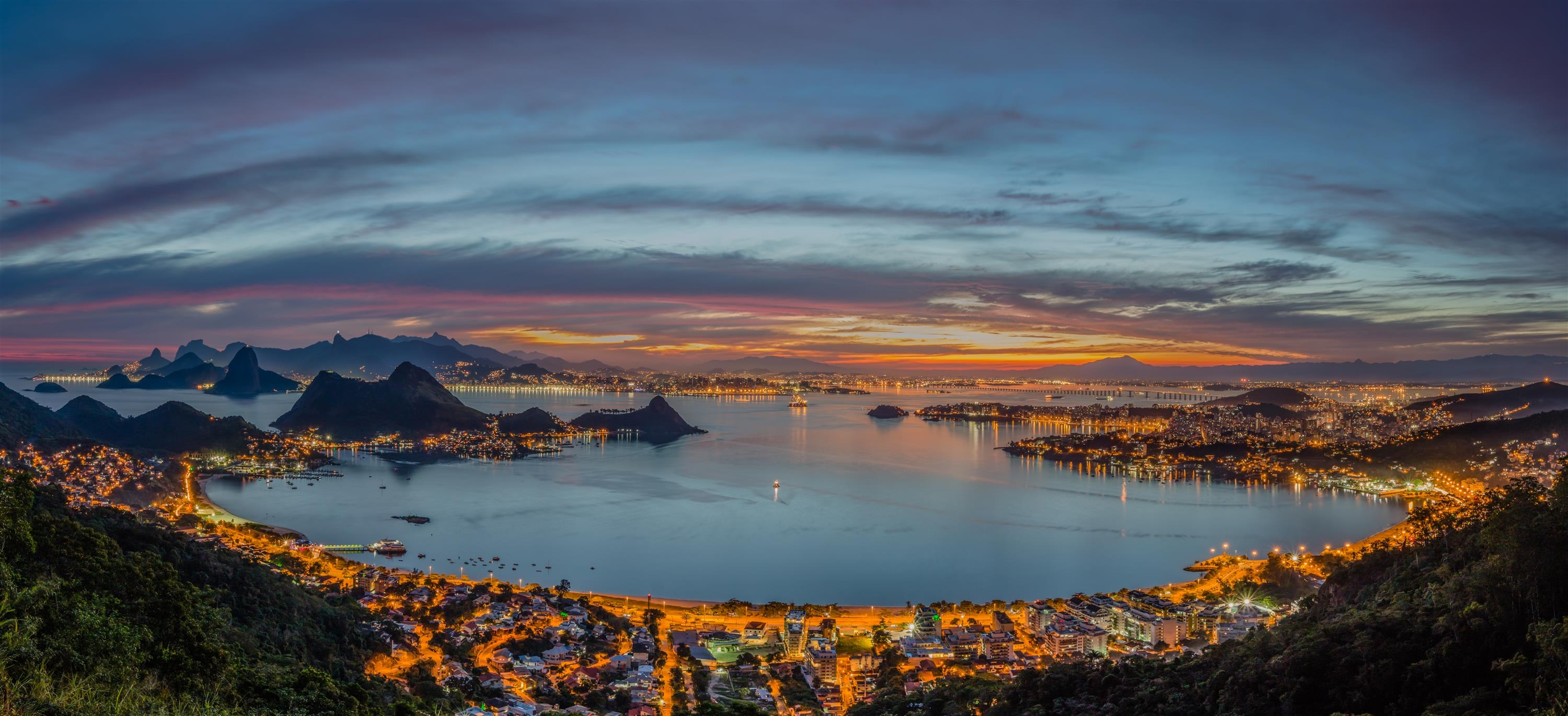
Charitas at night

Charitas is one of the 48 neighborhoods in which the city of Niterói, in Brazil is divided.

The area was part of the Jesuitic Sesmaria, where the Jesuits built a cemetery and a church consecrated to Saint Francis Xavier. The name of the neighborhood derives from the Latin word caritas, meaning charity, which is inscribed on the church's door.

In the 18th century, a landowner donated to the Saint Joseph Seminar, in Rio de Janeiro, the piece of land that came to be the Jurujuba Farm and upon which a mansion, known as Casarão (big house) was built.

In 1853, the Saint Isabel Naval Hospital was opened and originally run by the sanitarist Francisco de Paula Cândido, in whose honor the neighborhood was first named "Paula Cândido". The hospital's function was to isolate the sick people that came with the ships that docked in Rio de Janeiro's harbor. Later, the hospital was turned into a safe house to receive children that had been infected with tuberculosis known as Preventório, after which the local beach came to be known.

In the 1940s, an aeroclub was built in the area. It still exists and can handle small, private planes and helicopter landings and take-offs.

The neighborhood's limits are: the waters of the Guanabara Bay, the neighborhood of Piratininga (at the Viração Hill) and the neighborhoods of Jurujuba and São Francisco (contiguous boundary). Its territory is located in the São Francisco Ensenada, which is the land comprised between the Viração Hill and the shore.

The local population of approximately 3,854 (in 1991) represents 0.88% of Niterói's total population. A small chanty town exists on the Preventório Hill.

In June 2024, the beach at Charitas was considered suitable for swimming, except for the stretch to the right of the Clube Naval.
