= São Francisco, Niterói =

Coordinates: 22.91735°S 43.0895°W

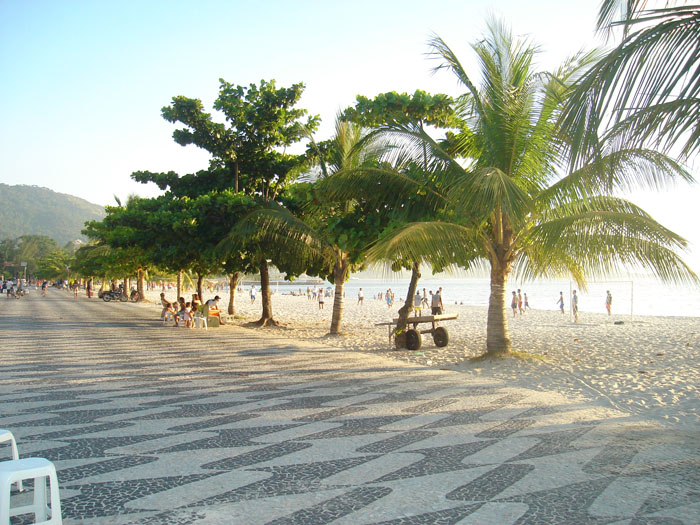
The São Francisco boardwalk

São Francisco is one of the 48 neighborhoods in which the Brazilian city of Niterói is divided. As of 2000, its population was 9,654.

Its name derives from the church consecrated to Saint Francis Xavier (in Portuguese: São Francisco Xavier) and references to it can be found as early as the 17th century. The São Francisco Ensenada, also known as "saco" de São Francisco" (roughly translated as São Francisco's "bag", on account of the Ensenada's shape), was an important source of fish for both the Indians and the Portuguese.

In the 19th century, an important road existed, connecting the neighborhood of Icaraí, across the Morro do Cavalão (Big Horse Hill), to Charitas and then across the Morro da Viração (Viração Hill) to Piratininga, on the Ocean shore (note that Icaraí, São Francisco and Charitas have their shores on the Guanabara Bay).

The population of approximately 9,620 (in 1991) represents 2.21% of Niterói's total population. No slums exist in the neighborhood.

The São Francisco waterfront is famous for its concentration of bars, restaurants and night clubs, being the beating heart of Niterói's nightlife.
