= Itaipu, Niterói =

Neighborhood in Niterói, Brazil

Itaipu is a Brazilian district within the municipality of Niterói, in Rio de Janeiro state. It is located at the Oceanic Region of Niterói, which means that its beach is outside the Guanabara Bay. Typical species are the Ipê, the Sagui, and the Urubu.

== History ==
In the colonial times, Itaipu had a strong economy, based on providing agricultural products to the city of Rio de Janeiro. Remains of that period are the church of São Sebastião de Itaipu and the convent of Santa Teresa (now, the Archeological Museum of Itaipu). But there was an economic decline and a consequent population decline. On the turn of the century 20th to the 21st, Itaipu began to grow again, with the implantation of sewerage and the construction of many condominiums.

The neighborhood currently has plenty of wildlife, seafood restaurants, inns and historical sites.

== Gallery ==
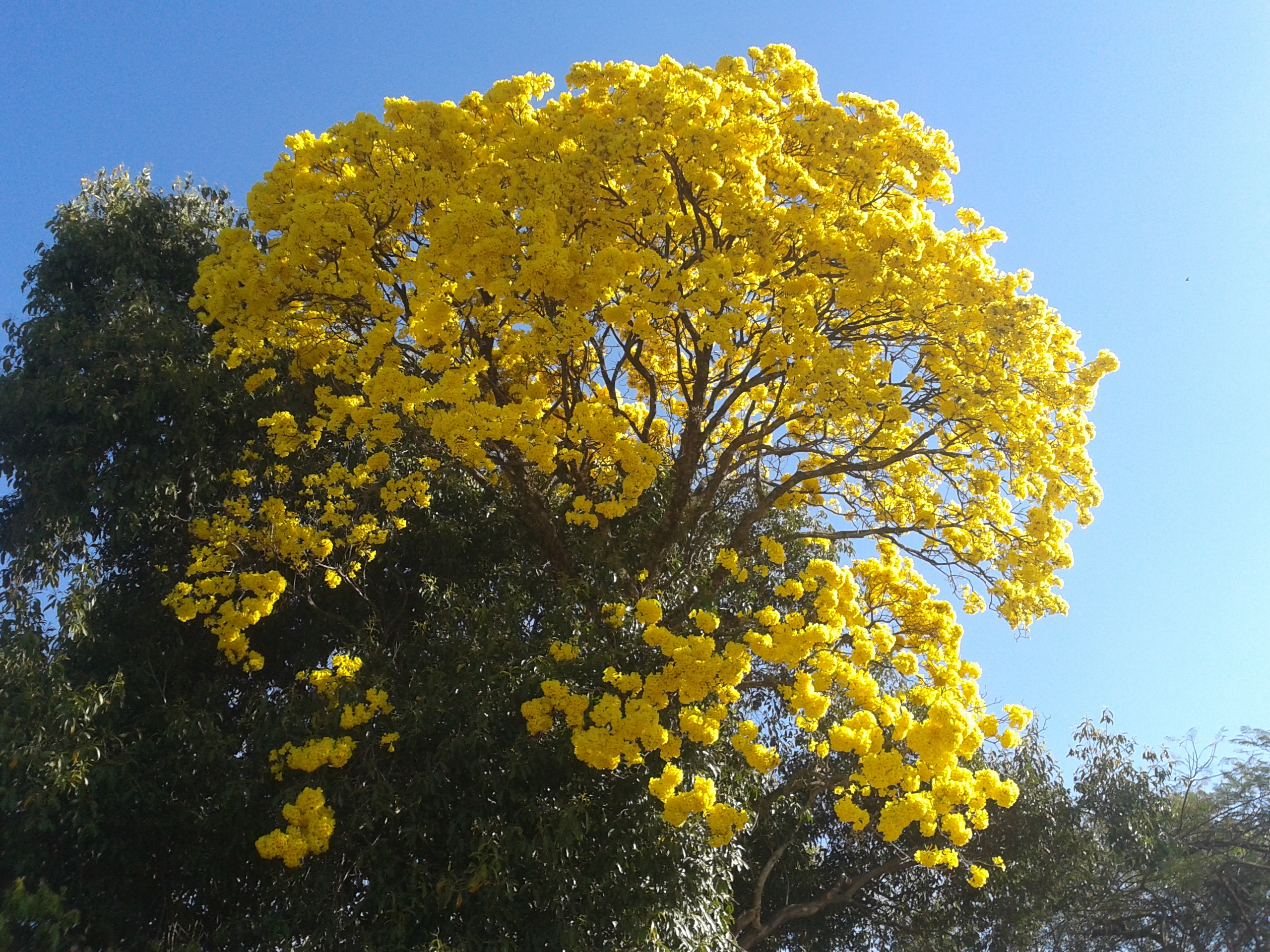
Ipê

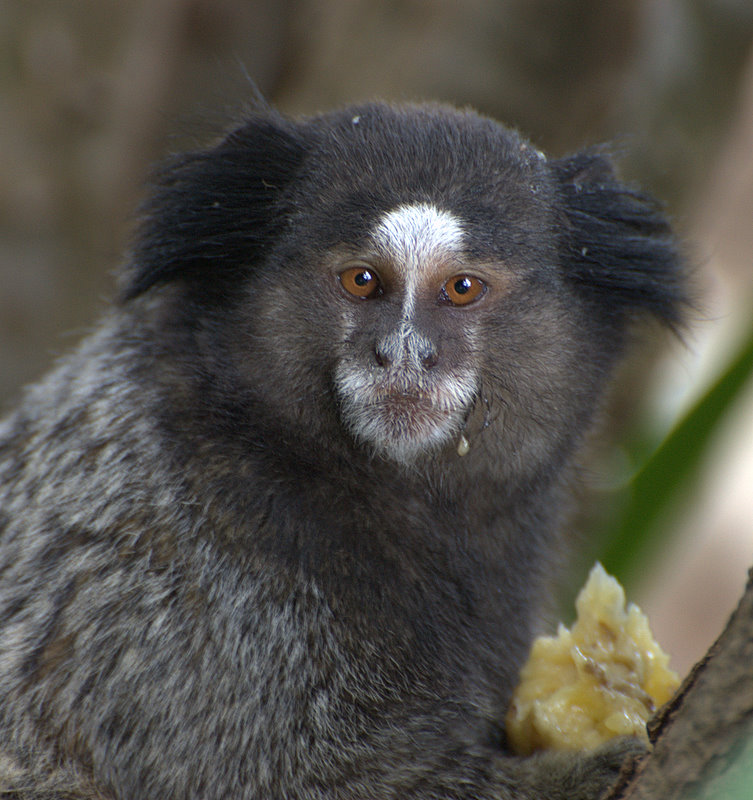
Sagui

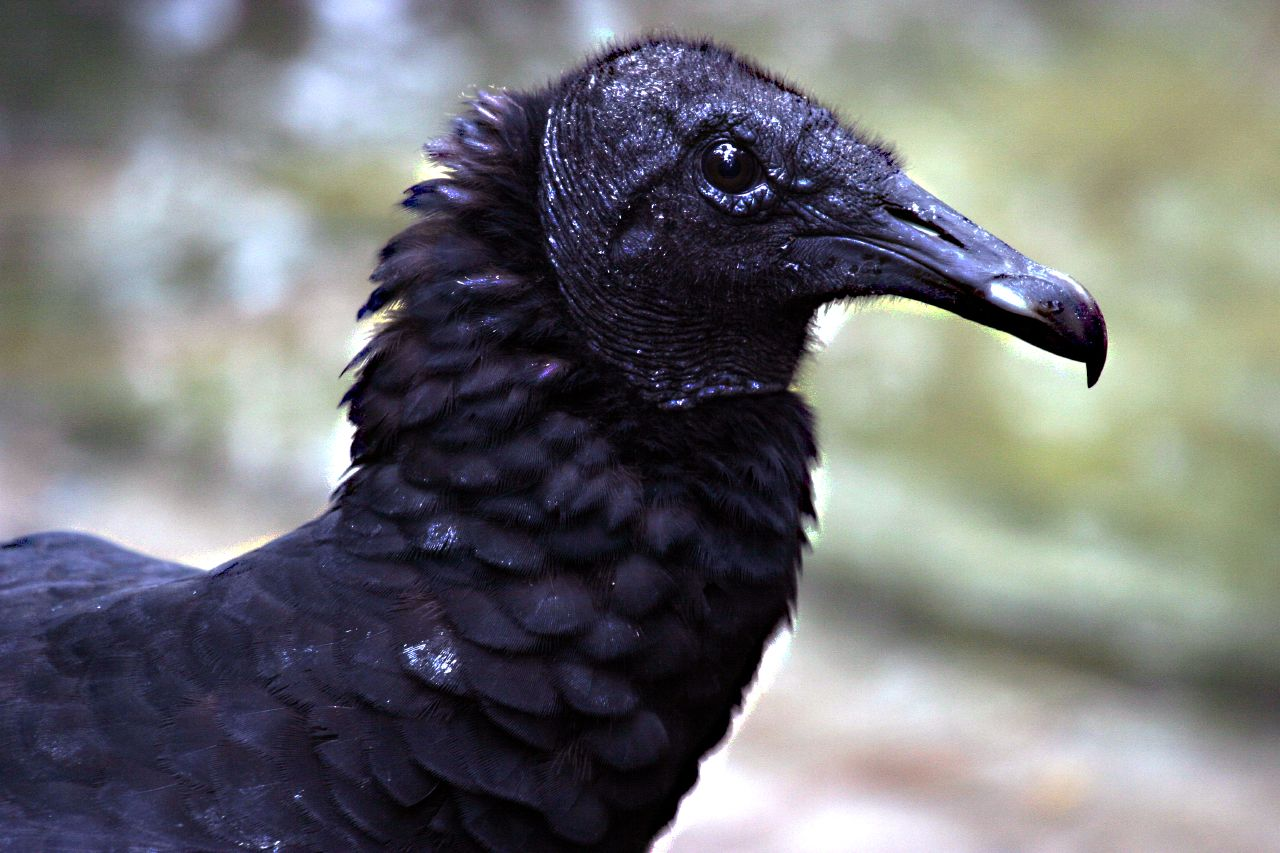
Vulture
