= Niterói =

Municipality in the State of Rio de Janeiro

- Municipality
- Municipality of Niterói
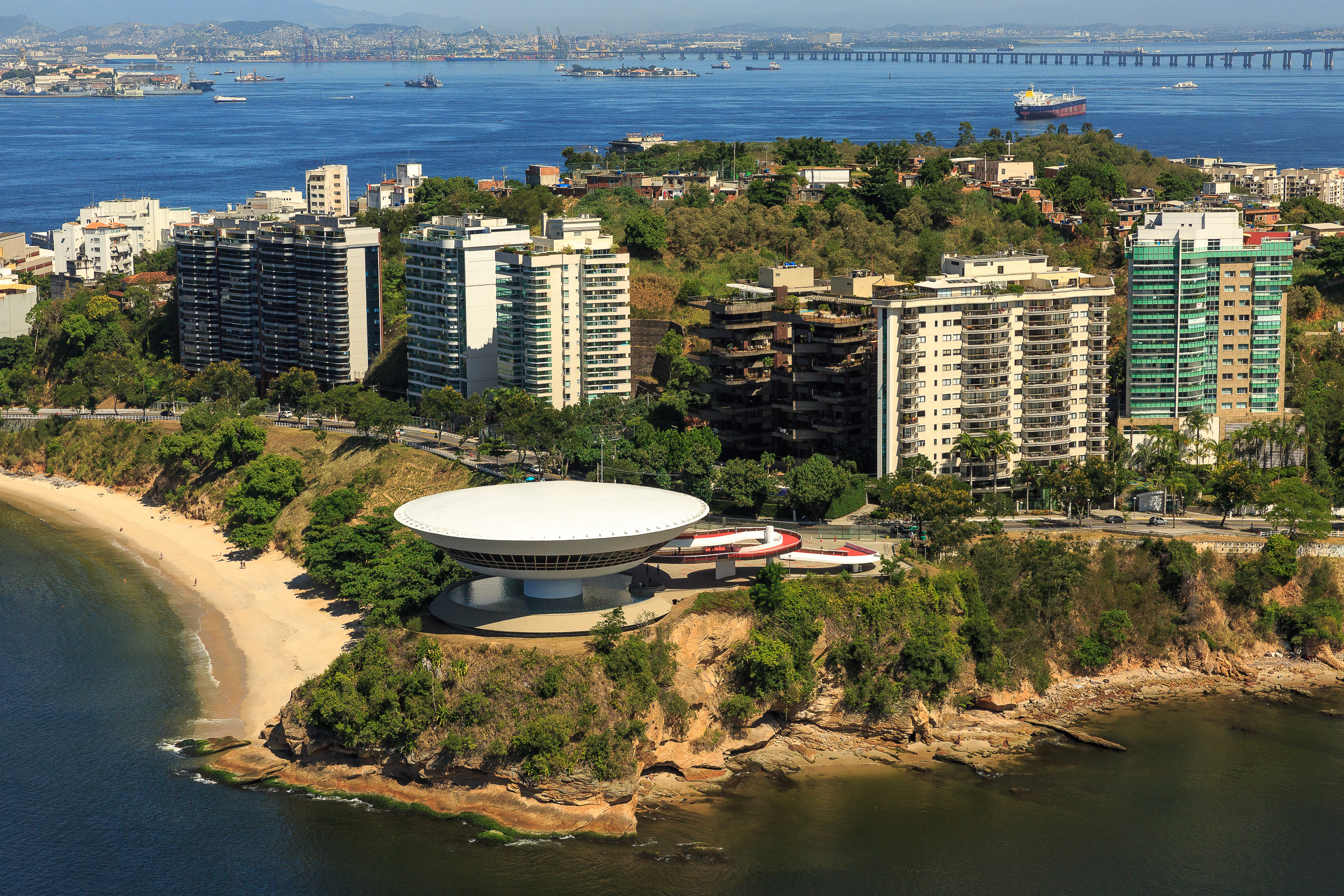
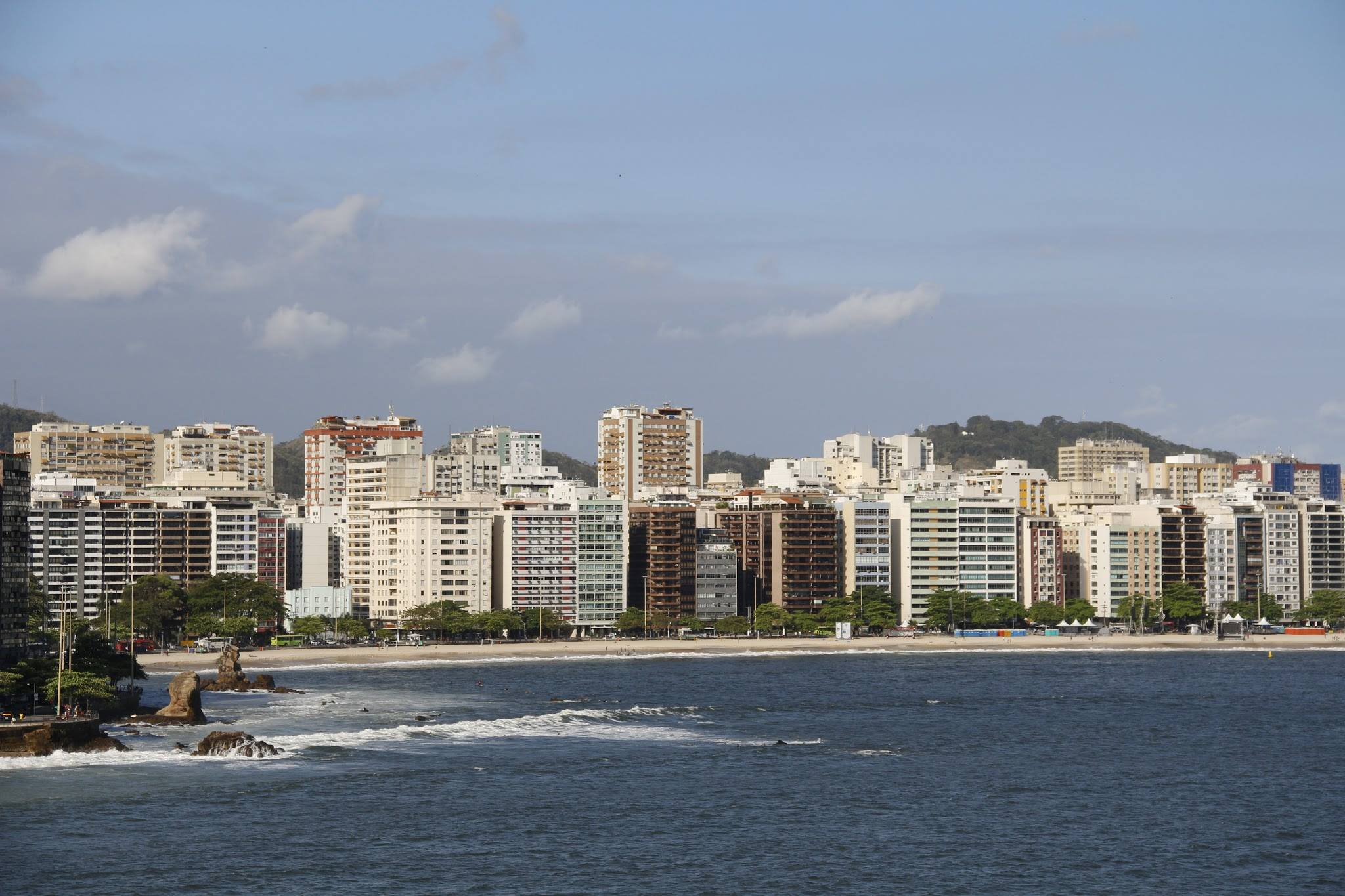
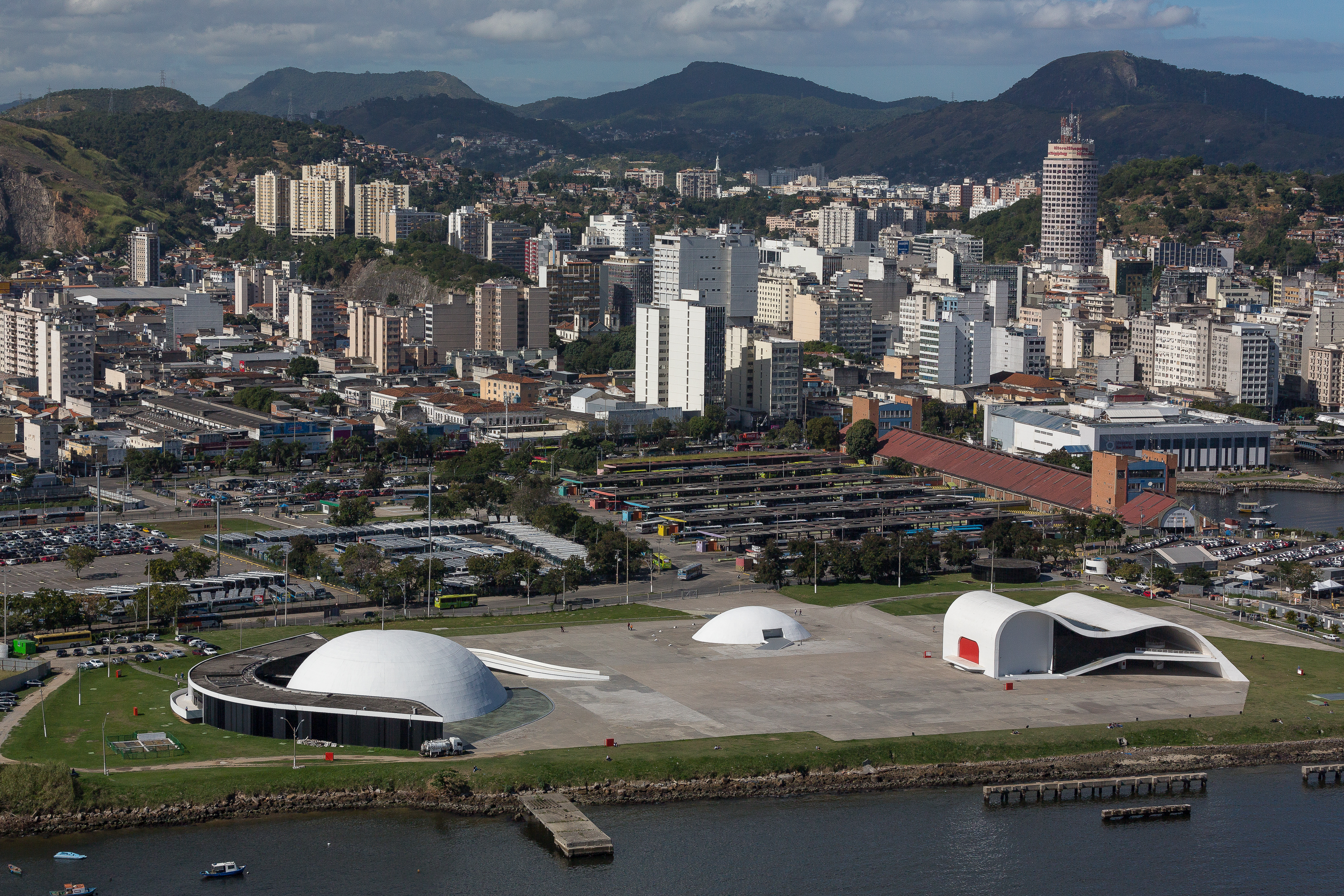
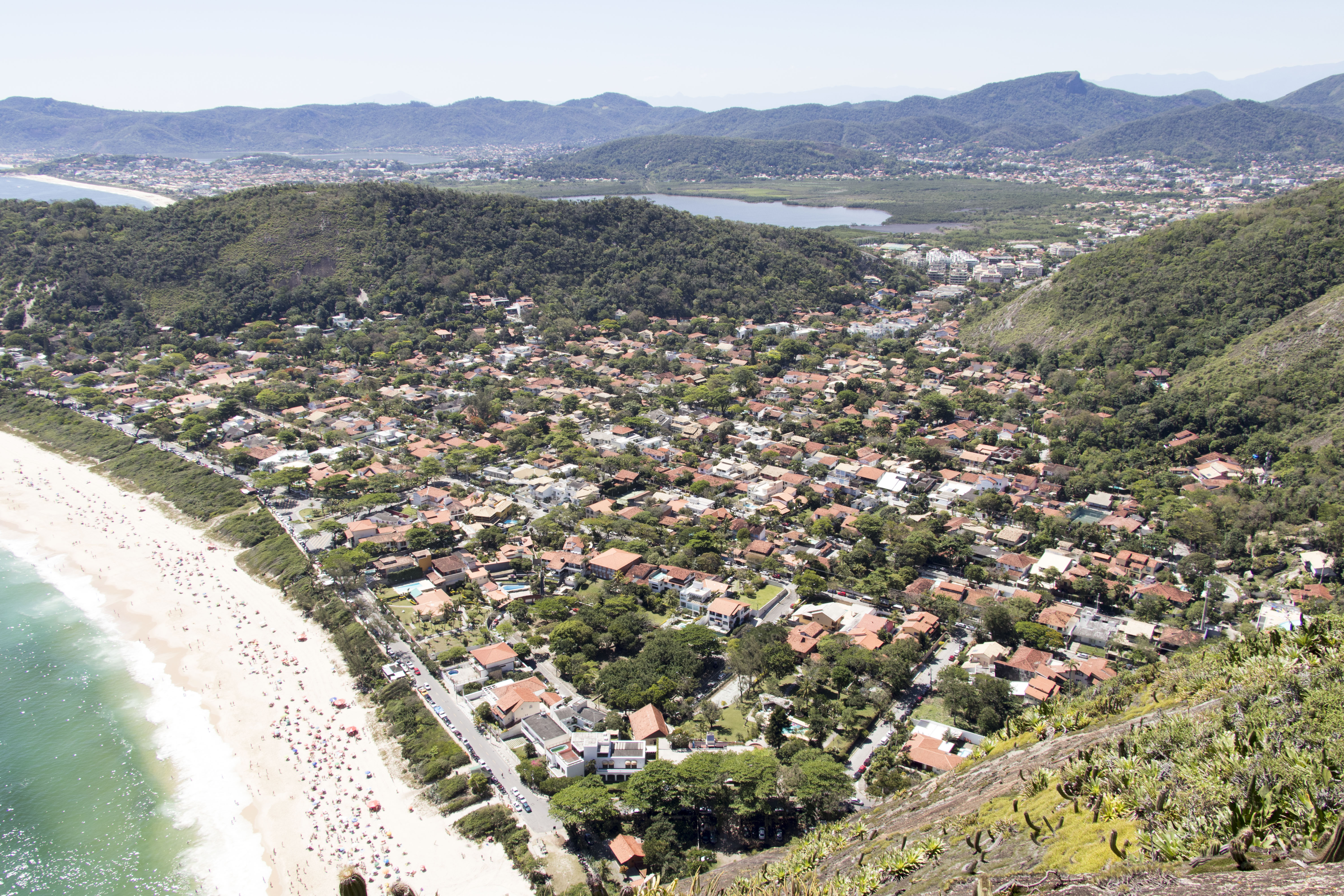
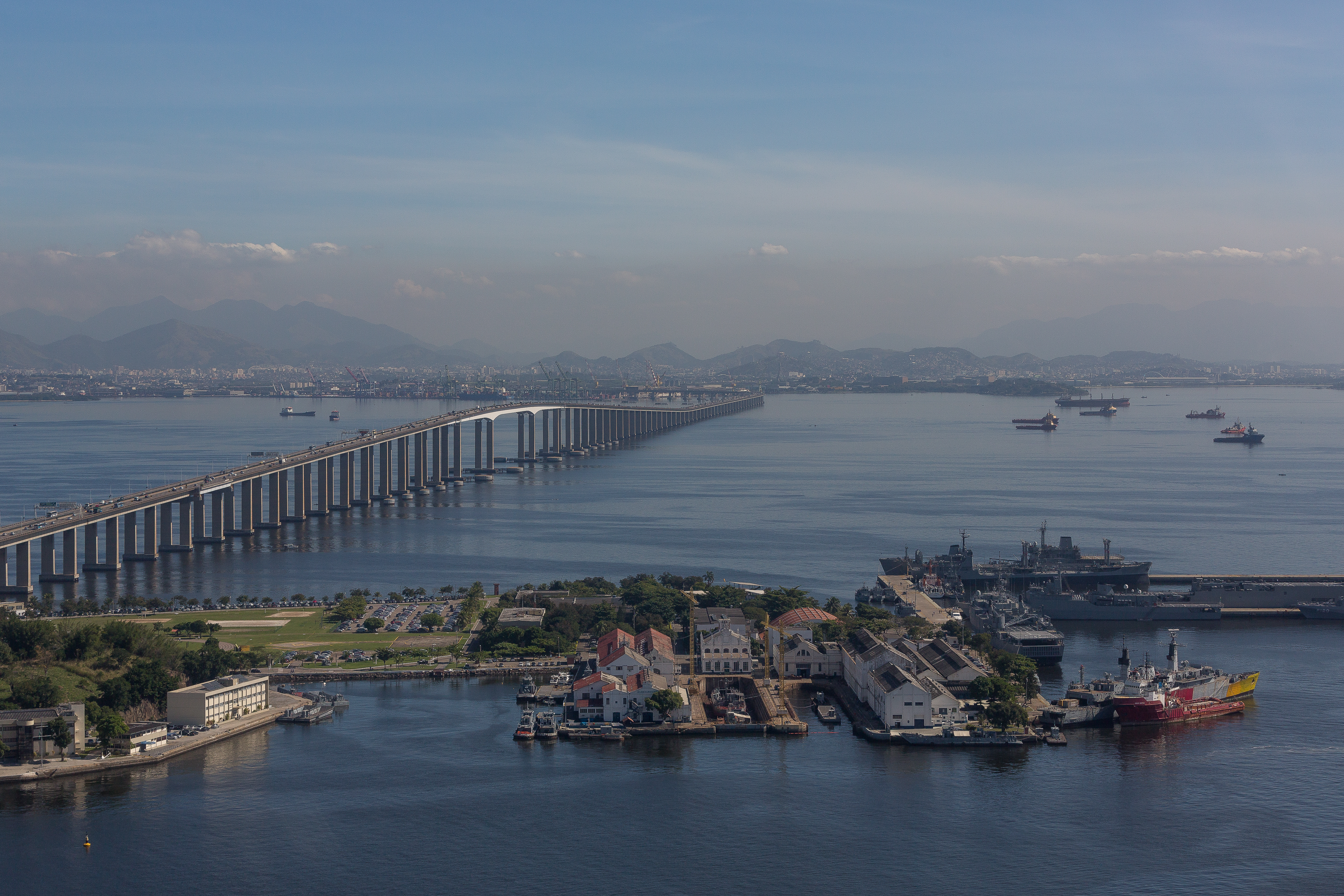
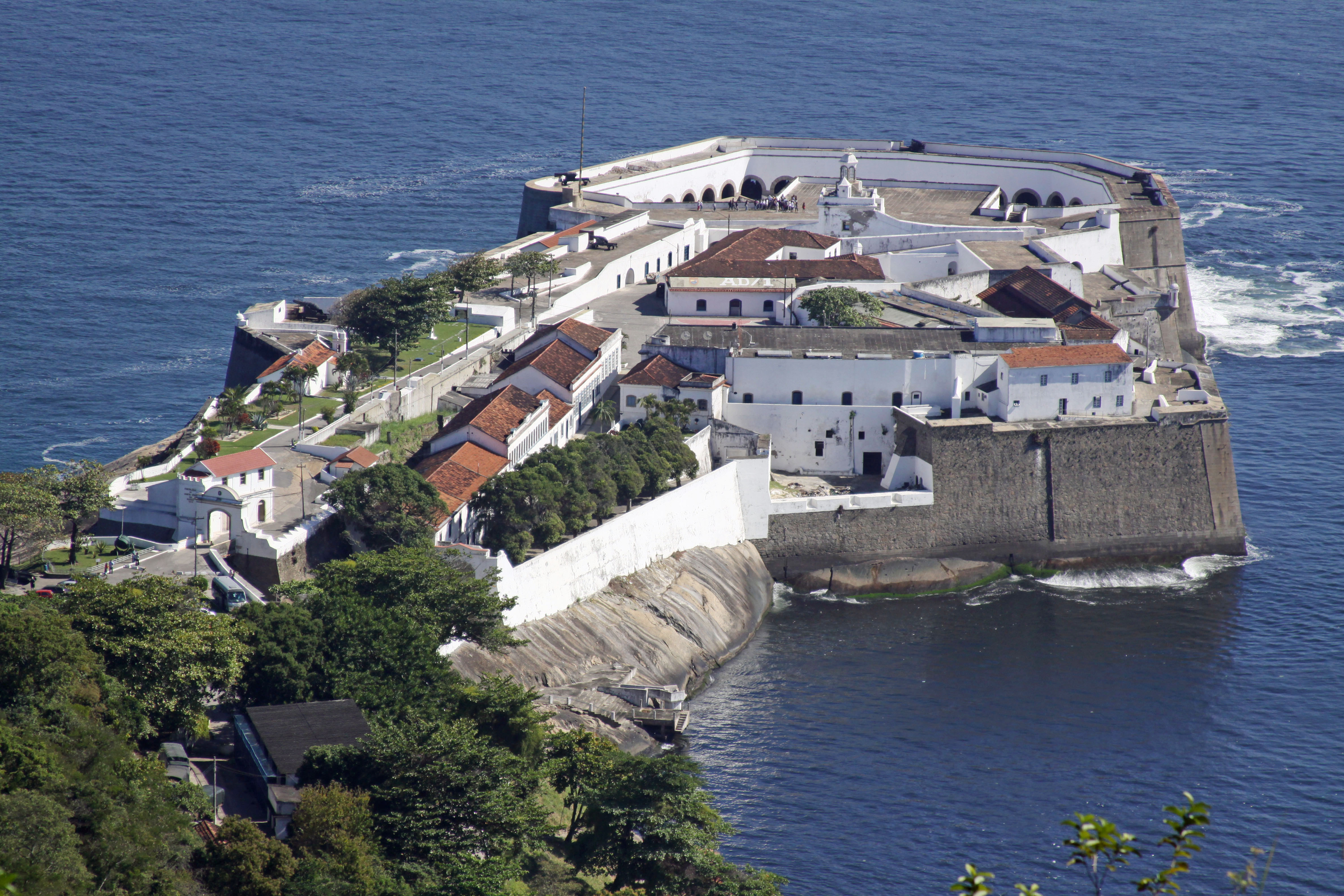
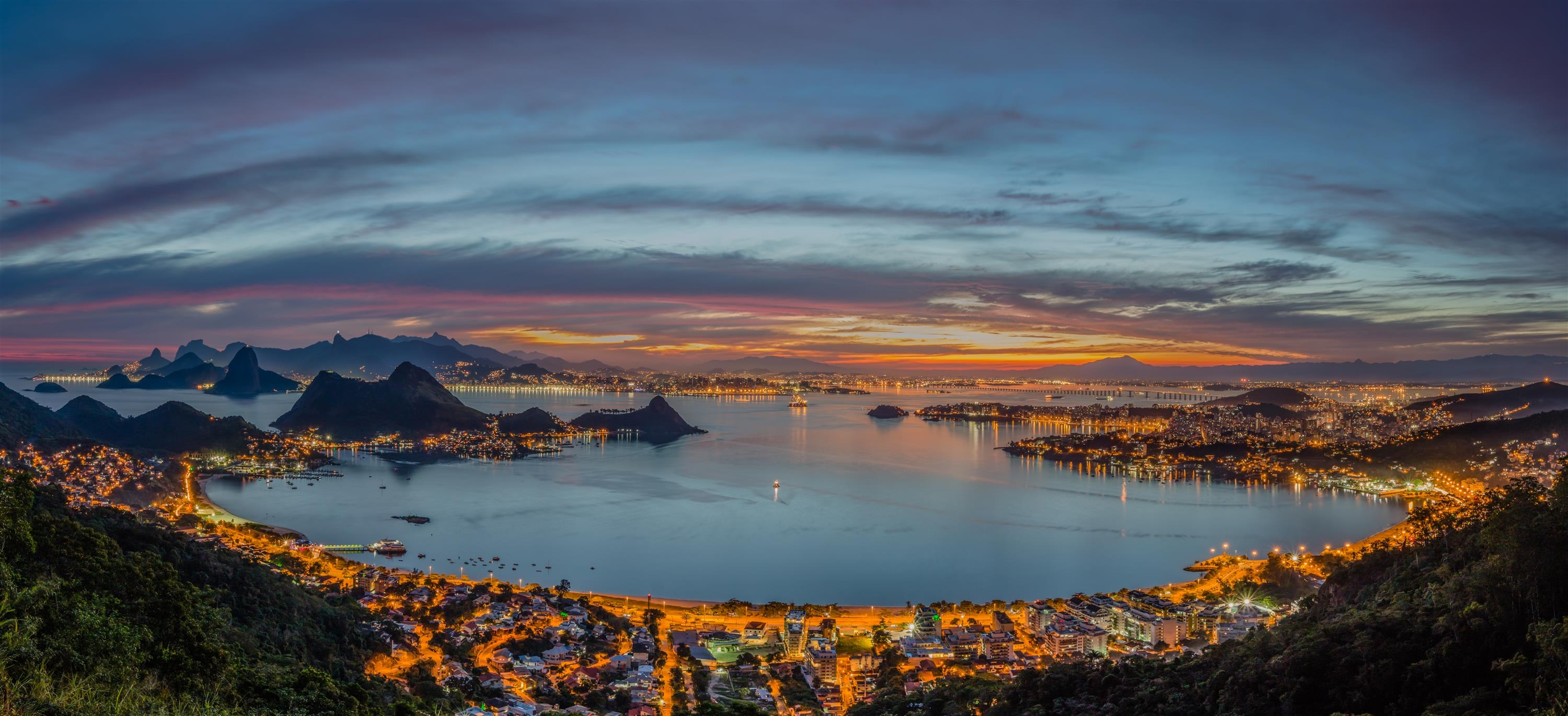
- Contemporary Art Museum Icaraí Beach Caminho Niemeyer Itacoatiara Beach Mocanguê Island and Rio–Niterói Bridge Santa Cruz da Barra Fortress Guanabara Bay as seen from Niterói

- Flag Coat of arms

- Location in Rio de Janeiro
- Coordinates: 22°52′58″S 43°06′14″W
- Country: Brazil
- Region: Southeast
- State: Rio de Janeiro
- Founded: 22 November 1573
- Founder: Arariboia

Government
  - Mayor: Rodrigo Neves (PDT)

Area
  - Total: 129.38 km^{2} (49.95 sq mi)
- Elevation: 0 m (0 ft)

Population (2020)
  - Total: 515,317
  - Density: 3,983.0/km^{2} (10,316/sq mi)
- Time zone: UTC−3 (BRT)
- Postal Code: 24000-000
- Area code: 21
- HDI (2010): 0.837 – very high
- Website: niteroi.rj.gov.br

Niterói (English: /ˌniːtəˈrɔɪ, ˌnɪtəˈrɔɪ/ NEE-tə-ROY, NIT-ə-ROY, Brazilian Portuguese: [niteˈɾɔj]) is a municipality in the state of Rio de Janeiro, in the southeast region of Brazil. It lies across Guanabara Bay, facing the city of Rio de Janeiro and forming part of the Rio de Janeiro Metropolitan Area. It was the capital of Rio de Janeiro, as marked by its golden mural crown, from 1834 to 1894 and again from 1903 to 1975. It has an estimated population of 515,317 inhabitants (2020) and an area of 129.375 km^{2} (49.952 sq mi), making it the fifth most populous city in the state. It has the highest Human Development Index in the state and the seventh highest among Brazil's municipalities in 2010. Individually, it is the municipality with the second highest average monthly household income per capita in Brazil and appears in 13th place among the municipalities of the country according to social indicators related to education. The city has the nicknames of Cidade Sorriso (Smile City).

Studies by the Getulio Vargas Foundation in June 2011 classified Niterói as the richest city in Brazil, with 55.7% of the population classified as class A. Considering classes A and B, Niterói also appears in the first place, with 85.9% of the population in these classes. According to 2010 data from IBGE, Niterói's nominal gross domestic product was 11.2 billion reais, being the fifth municipality with the highest gross domestic product of the state. The city is the second-largest formal employer in the state of Rio de Janeiro, although it ranks 5th in terms of population. The city is one of the main financial, commercial and industrial centers in the state of Rio de Janeiro, being the 12th among the 100 best Brazilian cities to do business.

Niterói was founded on 22 November 1573 by the Tupi chief Arariboia, who later was forcibly converted to Roman Catholicism and was given the Christian name of Martim Afonso, after the Portuguese explorer Martim Afonso de Sousa, making it the only Brazilian city to have been founded by a non-Christian, non-assimilated indigenous person.

The municipality contains part of the 2,400-hectare (5,900-acre) Serra da Tiririca State Park, created in 1991.

== Toponym ==
"Niterói" is a term of Tupi origin, with "Nheterõîa" being its recorded form in the Vocabulary in the Brasílica Language (Vocabulário na língua brasílica), a dictionary of the Tupi language compiled at the end of the 16th century. According to Frederico Edelweiss, this term would mean "the (bay) all sinuous", through the composition of nhe-, a reflexive pronoun, terõ, "sinuous" (a term recorded by Antonio Ruiz de Montoya in his Tesoro de la lengua guaraní ), and îá, a particle that indicates a customary trait. Edelweiss reinforces this hypothesis through the poem De Gestis Mendi de Saa, which calls Rio de Janeiro a "sinuous port" twice, and he suggests that this designation reveals Tupi influence.

== History ==
=== France Antarctique ===
Historical affiliations

(Portugal) Portuguese Empire 1573–1815
United Kingdom 1815–1822
Empire of Brazil 1822–1889
Republic of Brazil 1889–present

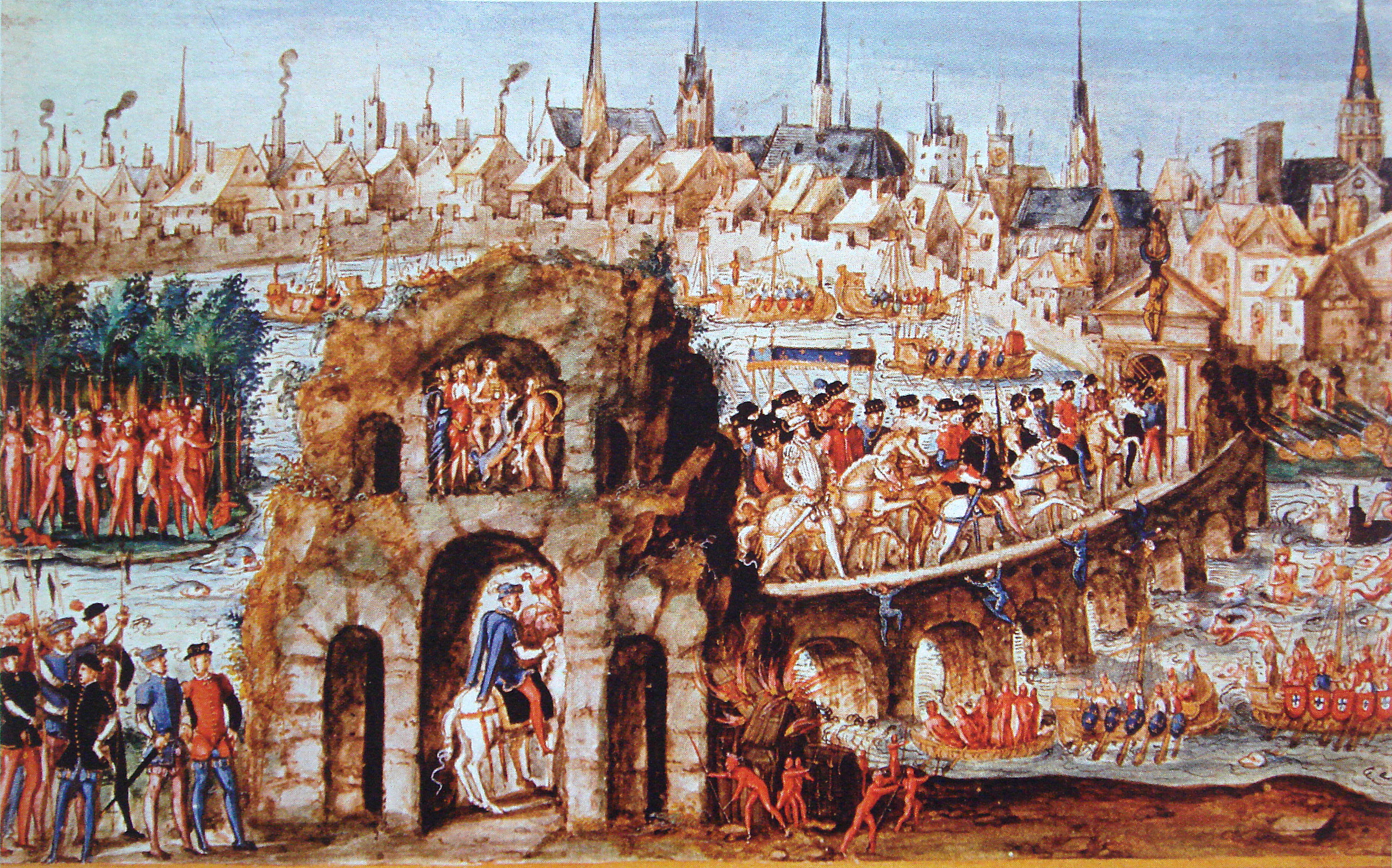
At the royal entry of Henry II in Rouen, 1 October 1550, about fifty naked men were employed to illustrate life in Brazil and a battle between the Tupinambá allies of the French, and the Tabajara Indians.

In the year 1555, French navigator Nicolas Durand de Villegaignon allied himself with the Tupinambas Indians who dominated the Guanabara Bay and instituted a French colony in the region, France Antarctique. The region was avoided by the Portuguese because of the hostility of the Tupinamba. The region developed under the command of Villegaignon, who planned to build a city in the region. After a while, Calvinists who had emigrated from France to the colony returned to France, where they accused Villegaignon of prejudice against Protestants and of maladministration. The French navigator had to return to France to explain himself.

Following the absence of the French leader, the Portuguese crown began noticing that the bay of Rio de Janeiro would make a strategic scale for the Atlantic route of ships from Portugal to its colonies in Africa and Asia, as well an important advanced bridgehead for the defense of South Brazil. Fortresses were built and an alliance was formed with nearby native Tupi-Guaraní tribes to defend the settlement against other European invaders. Then, in 1560, the Portuguese leader Mem de Sá attacked and destroyed the French fort that was located in Guanabara Bay, Coligny Fort, without, however, being able to definitively expel the French from the region. Estácio de Sá, Mem de Sá's nephew, who would continue to command the war, enlisted the help of the head of the Temiminos Indians, Arariboia, who accepted the governor's request to help the Portuguese expel the French from the Guanabara Bay, in the hope to regain the mother island.

With the end of the war in 1567, Estácio de Sá invoked Arariboia and the Temininós Indians to occupy the right side of the entrance to the Guanabara Bay, opposite the city of São Sebastião do Rio de Janeiro founded by Estácio in 1565, as previously requested by Arariboia a tract of land. Thus, the entrance to the bay would be fully protected from intrusion. The place to be occupied by Arariboia was known as "Banda D'Além" (the land beyond), in the eastern side of the bay, from River Marui to the Red Barriers between Gragoata and Boa Viagem beaches. This area corresponded to what is nowadays the northwestern part of the municipality of Niterói, which includes the central and northern zones of its urban area. There, in the "Land Beyond", Arariboia founded the Town of Saint Lawrence of the Indians (in Portuguese, Vila de São Lourenço dos Índios), the embryo for the future city of Niterói, a Tupi name that means "Hidden Waters".

=== Imperial era ===
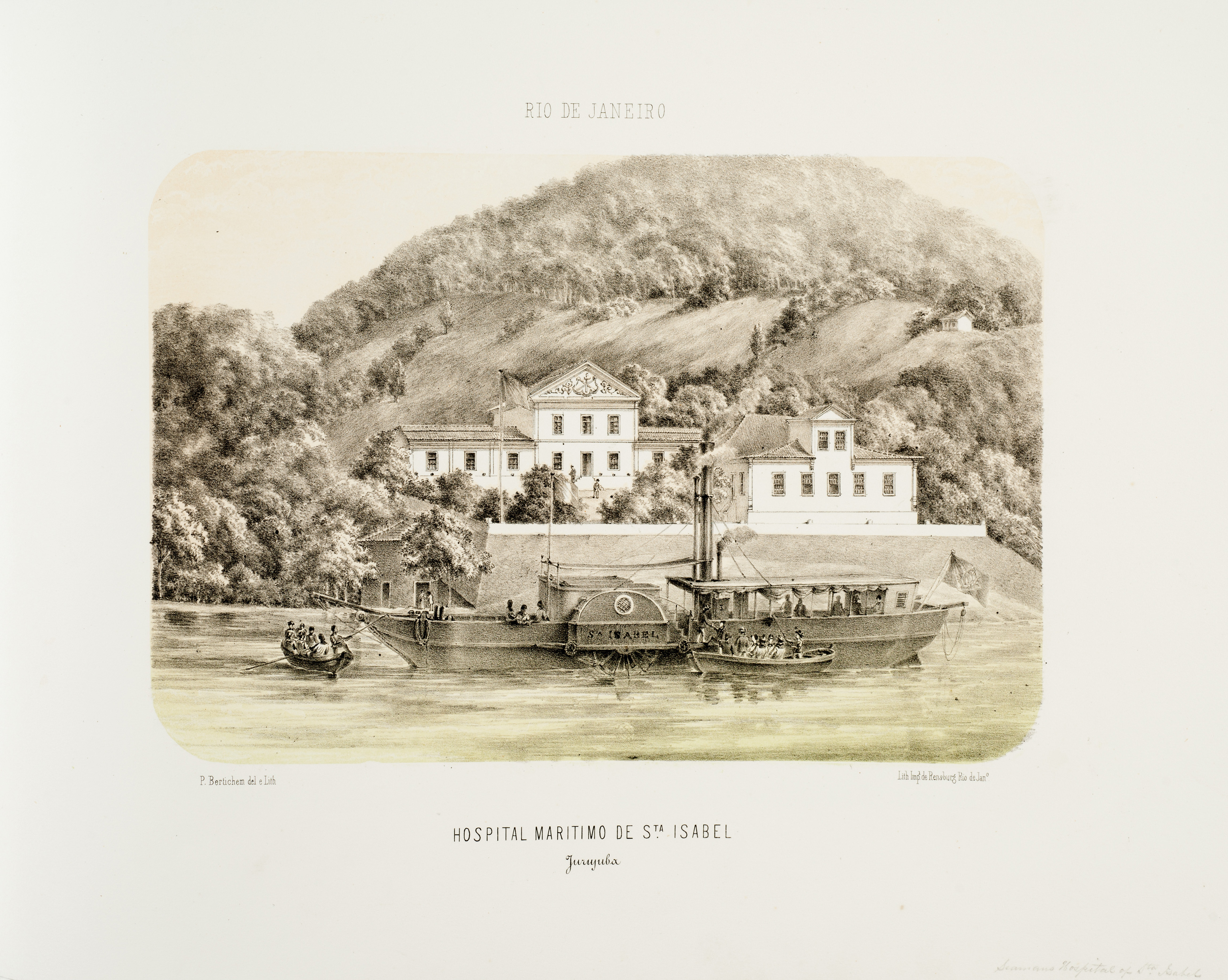
St. Isabel Maritime Hospital in Jurujuba area, 1853

The village was visited by the King of Brazil, John VI, in 1816, who also decreed its emancipation from Rio de Janeiro on 10 May 1819 and gave the new-created municipality a new name, Vila Real da Praia Grande (Royal Town of Great Beach).

In 1834, the city of Rio de Janeiro, capital of the newly established Empire of Brazil, was detached from the rest of Rio de Janeiro Province; Vila Real da Praia Grande was then chosen as the new capital of that province, while the city of Rio de Janeiro itself was converted into a neutral municipality, following the Ato Adicional. Niterói served the function of capital until the year of 1975 – except for the period between 1894 and 1903 when it was temporarily transferred to the city of Petrópolis.

Vila Real da Praia Grande was officially renamed Nictheroy (Tupi for "hidden waters") on 6 March 1835. This old spelling persisted until the mid-20th century, when the current spelling–Niterói–was adopted. The capital condition has brought a number of urban developments such as the steam boat, public lighting to whale oil, water supply and new means of transport to connect the city to the interior of the province. Nine years later, the Emperor D. Pedro II granted the city of Niterói the title of Imperial City. The appointment was given to the most important cities, giving them some autonomy and regional power.

At the end of the 19th century, around 1885, some tram systems were founded, which allowed the expansion of the city to Icaraí, Ponta d'Areia and Itaipu districts.

=== Republican era ===
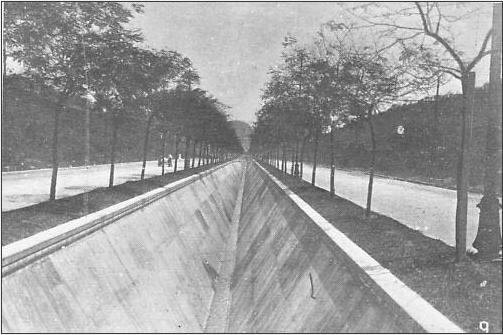
Alameda São Boaventura in Fonseca area, 1909

In 1890, the Brazilian provinces began being called states and the neutral municipality (Rio de Janeiro city) had its status changed to Federal District (or simply DF, the Portuguese acronym for Distrito Federal).

The monarchist navy revolt in 1893 damaged productive activities and forced the transfer of the capital's headquarters to Petrópolis. In 1903, Niterói returned to be the capital of the state of Rio de Janeiro. This brought about a new impulse to modernize the city with the construction of squares, decks, parks, waterway station and sewage network, as well as widening of the streets and main avenues.

A circus fire in the city killed 323 people on 17 December 1961; the fire was later found to have been deliberately set by disgruntled circus employees. It is one of the worst tragedies in Brazilian history and the most fatal in the annals of world circus show history.

Following the transference of Brazil's capital to Brasília in 1960, the city of Rio de Janeiro became a city-state named Guanabara. This state was merged with Rio de Janeiro State in 1975; since then, Niterói lost its condition of the state's capital in favor of the city of Rio de Janeiro.

On 8 April 2010; the mudslide triggered due to heavy rainfall cost at least 200 lives. At least 11,000 people were forced to flee homes due to further mudslides.

== Geography ==
Niterói has an area of 129,375 square kilometers located between the Guanabara Bay (west), the Atlantic Ocean (south), Maricá (east) and São Gonçalo (north).

There are a number of beaches in the area, including Praia de Fora and Praia do Imbuí, with their historical values; Piratininga Beach, Camboinhas Beach, Itaipu Beach and Itacoatiara Beach, the most visited; Praia do Sossego, Praia Adam and Eve and Prainha. It has two saltwater lagoons: Piratininga and Itaipu. The first is linked to the second by means of the Camboatá Canal, opened by the National Department of Sanitation Works in 1946. The Itaipu Lagoon, in turn, connects to the sea through the Itaipu Canal, which was built in 1979.

The relief consists of crystalline terrains, divided into massifs and coastal hills. The massifs predominate in the south and form the mountains of Malheiro, Calaboca and Tiririca, where is the Stone of the Elephant, the highest point of the municipality, 412m high.

The coastal plains are composed of sediments, obviously located near the sea. The most extensive area covers the entire area of Piratininga and Itaipu lagoons.

=== Climate ===
Niterói has a tropical climate, specifically a tropical monsoon climate, with warm to hot temperatures year round as well as relatively frequent rainfall.

Climate data for Niterói (1931–1960)
Month	Jan	Feb	Mar	Apr	May	Jun	Jul	Aug	Sep	Oct	Nov	Dec	Year
Mean daily maximum °C (°F)	32.2 (90.0)	32.4 (90.3)	31.5 (88.7)	29.1 (84.4)	27.4 (81.3)	26.6 (79.9)	26.1 (79.0)	26.9 (80.4)	27.0 (80.6)	27.9 (82.2)	28.7 (83.7)	30.1 (86.2)	28.8 (83.8)
Daily mean °C (°F)	26.4 (79.5)	26.5 (79.7)	25.7 (78.3)	23.6 (74.5)	21.5 (70.7)	20.2 (68.4)	19.6 (67.3)	20.5 (68.9)	21.4 (70.5)	22.6 (72.7)	23.6 (74.5)	25.0 (77.0)	23.0 (73.4)
Mean daily minimum °C (°F)	22.1 (71.8)	22.2 (72.0)	21.6 (70.9)	19.6 (67.3)	17.3 (63.1)	15.6 (60.1)	14.8 (58.6)	15.6 (60.1)	17.1 (62.8)	18.6 (65.5)	19.6 (67.3)	20.8 (69.4)	18.7 (65.7)
Average precipitation mm (inches)	147.1 (5.79)	136.7 (5.38)	149.4 (5.88)	124.0 (4.88)	89.9 (3.54)	55.9 (2.20)	52.3 (2.06)	50.1 (1.97)	59.3 (2.33)	87.9 (3.46)	115.8 (4.56)	139.3 (5.48)	1,207.7 (47.55)
Average relative humidity (%)	74.8	76.0	77.5	79.5	80.8	81.2	79.4	75.9	76.3	76.8	76.7	76.9	77.6
Mean monthly sunshine hours	196.7	179.8	189.3	159.9	144.2	134.7	156.6	182.5	139.8	146.0	157.3	161.5	1,948.3
Source: Instituto Nacional de Meteorologia

== Politics ==
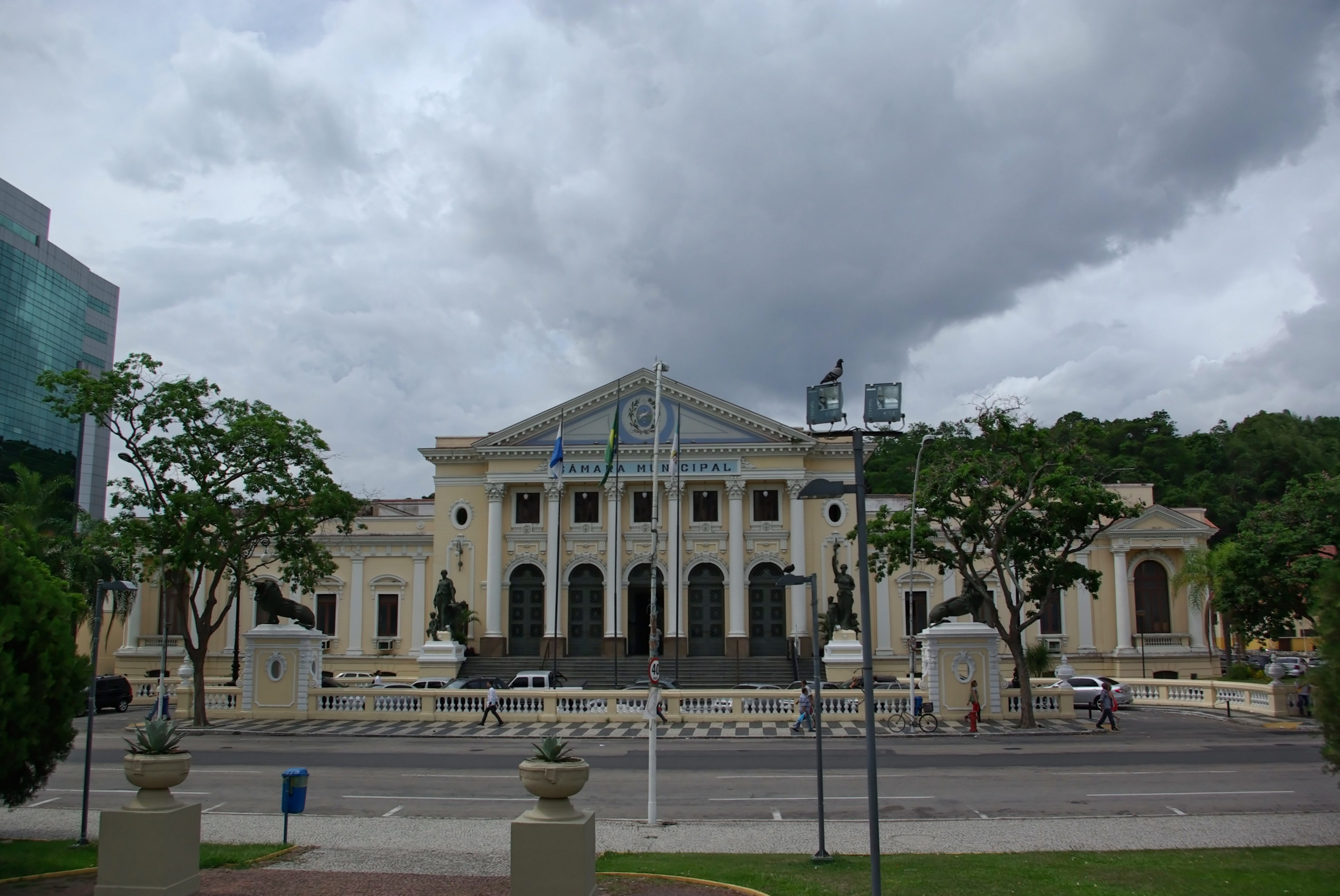
Niterói Municipal Chamber

In Niterói, executive power is represented by the mayor and cabinet of secretaries, in accordance with the model laid out by the Federal Constitution. The organic law of the Municipality and the current master plan require that the public administration should give the population effective tools to exercise participatory democracy. The city is divided into regional administrations, each headed by a secretary appointed by the mayor.

The city's legislature is constituted by the Niterói Municipal Chamber, composed of 21 elected councilors for four year terms (in compliance with the provisions of Article 29 of the Federal Constitution, which governs a minimum and maximum number of city councilors according to each municipality's population).

The current mayor of Niterói is Rodrigo Neves (PDT), who was re-elected in 2024 after serving two terms from 2013 to 2017 and 2017 to 2021.

== Economy ==
Niteroi is one most important financial and commercial centers in Rio de Janeiro State, like a modern city, with modern buildings and several shopping malls. Its economy is centered on its trading and commerce services, like real-estate corporations, graphic design, web design and publicity. It also hosts industries of food (especially seafood), clothes, candles, and marine objects.

The city is located 25 minutes away from Rio de Janeiro's downtown region. Niterói boasts the title of fourth richest city in Rio de Janeiro State, and the third in the Rio de Janeiro Metropolitan Area. The Niterói Contemporary Art Museum, the city's main landmark, was designed by the famous Brazilian modernist architect Oscar Niemeyer. The landscape of the central urban area of the city is dominated by the Niterói Tower, a tall cylindrical office building belonging to the Niterói Shopping Mall.

=== Growth ===
By the time of its emancipation, the urban area of Niteroi corresponded to its central zone and São Domingos only. The south zone – Icarai, Santa Rosa, Vital Brazil – began to be urbanized in 1841, when the Santa Rosa farm was divided into estates, while Jurujuba evolved from an old fishermen colony. São Francisco and Charitas, sites named after the Catholic Church built in honor to Saint Francis by the Jurujuba cove, remained sparsely populated until about 1940. As for the northern zone of Niteroi, its urbanization began in the late 19th century, when a tramway was inaugurated, allowing the expansion of the city to north and northeast, as well boosting the urban growth of the neighboring municipality of São Gonçalo.

The realm of Itaipu – a former vast zone of farming lands and forests east of Niteroi – was annexed to the municipality in 1943. It has lost its countryside traits and its urban population has grown fast since the late 1960s.

In the early 20th century, Niteroi started its industrialization boom.

== Demographics ==
Niteroi is 14 km (8.7 mi) distant from Rio de Janeiro City, to which it is linked by the Rio–Niterói Bridge and two ferryboat services. According to the 2010 Brazilian Census, the city has a population of 487,320 people, making it the fifth most populous city in the state of Rio de Janeiro and the 39th most populous in the country. At the 2010 Census, the population of Niterói grew 9.3% from 2000 to 2010, meaning Niterói had the lowest city population growth in the state of Rio de Janeiro in this period.

The quality of life of the municipality of Niteroi is considered one of the best (third place) among 5,600 other Brazilian municipalities, according to UN indexes (2000 est.).

Population growth of Niterói
Year	Population
1950	698,582
1970	513,771
1990	431,070
2000	459,451
2010	487,327
2022	481,749

=== Religion ===
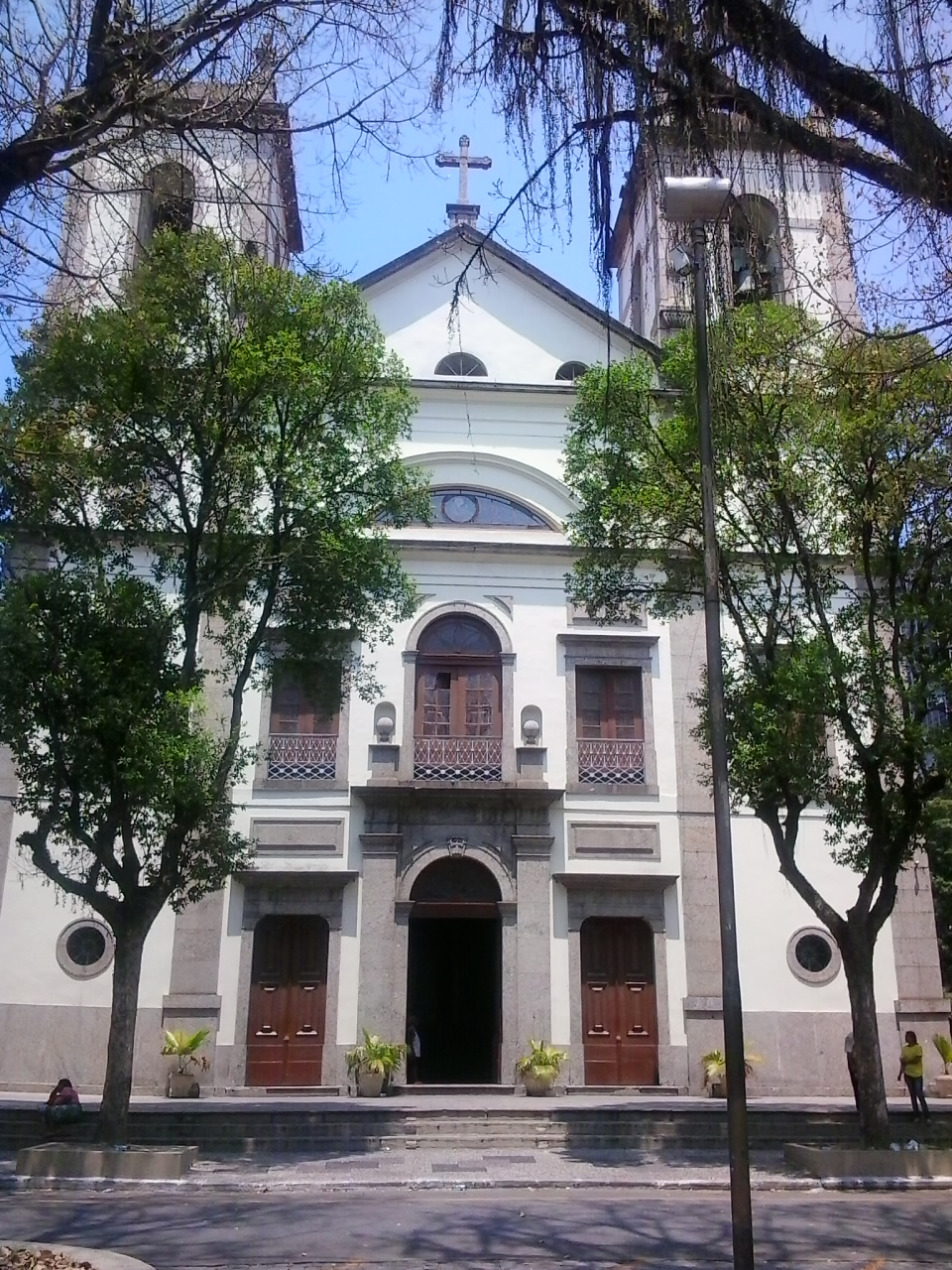
Catedral de São João

In the city of Niterói there are several manifest religious doctrines. According to the 2010 census, of the total population of Niterói, there were 258,391 Roman Catholic (53%), 97,759 evangelicals (35%) and 34,484 Spiritists (11%).

According to the division of the Catholic Church in Brazil, Niterói belongs to the Regional Episcopal Council East I of the National Conference of Bishops of Brazil, and the archiepiscopal seat is in the city of Niterói. The Archdiocese of Niterói comprises 14 municipalities of the region of the capital and the interior of Rio de Janeiro State, forming in total 73 parishes and 1 quasi-parish divided into 6 vicariates. There is also the Jewish community integrated to the Israeli Federation of Rio de Janeiro, it also has the most different Protestant creeds, as well as the practice of Buddhism, messianism, Afro-Brazilian religions and others.

== Education ==
Niteroi is the seat of the Fluminense Federal University, one of the most important research centers in Brazil. Other colleges include ISE La Salle and Cândido Mendes University.

Catholic schools, mainly La Salle Institute and São Vicente de Paulo, are the most traditional elementary and high schools of the city. Other important schools are PH, Marília Matoso, Pedro II, Gay Lussac, Instituto Abel, Colégio Nossa Senhora Das Mercês, the Salesian High School, ETE – Henrique Lage (a.k.a. Faetec), Oswaldo Cruz Institute and Escola Canadense de Niterói.

Niterói has the highest Human Development Index (HDI) and best level of literacy in Rio de Janeiro State.

== Transportation ==
=== Bus ===
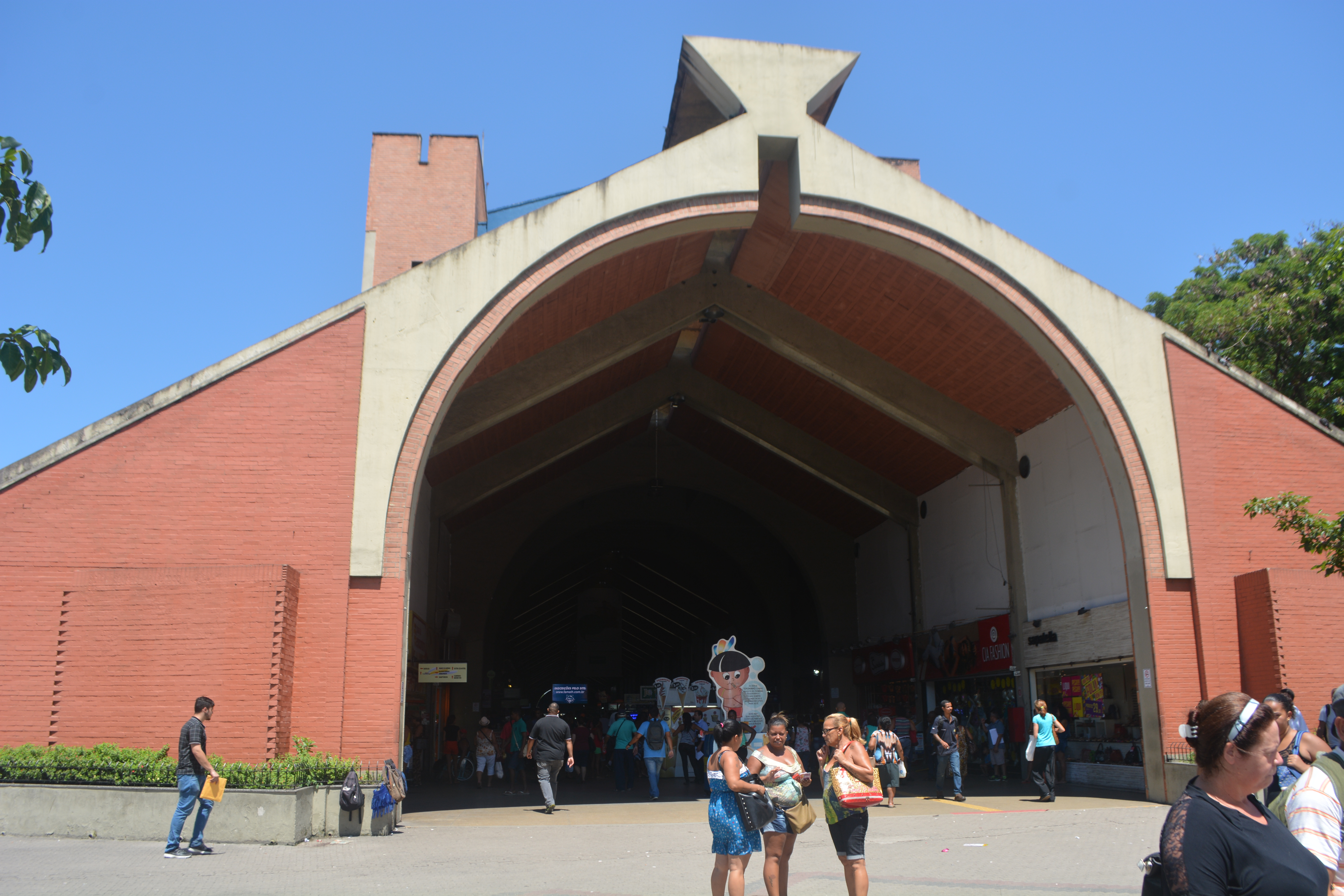
João Goulart bus station

Niterói has 67 municipal bus lines, 34 of which run to João Goulart bus station in the city centre. This bus station is also the terminus of 84 intermunicipal bus lines running to Rio de Janeiro, São Gonçalo, Itaboraí, Maricá, Araruama, Saquarema, Duque de Caxias, São João de Meriti, Nova Iguaçu and Itaguaí. Over 500,000 passengers per day pass through João Goulart bus station.

Niterói's municipal bus system is operated by nine private companies grouped into two consortiums called Transnit and Transoceânico. As of 2019, the system transports approximately 358 thousand passengers per day. As of 2026, the system includes approximately 530 buses, all of which are air-conditioned. Most bus trips within Niterói take between one and two hours, with an average journey time of approximately 87 minutes.

There is a 12 km (7.5 mi) Bus with High Level of Service (BHLS) corridor with 13 stations that runs between Charitas and Itaipu along the main arterial road in the Região Oceânica (Oceanic Region). This bus corridor allows commuters from the Região Oceânica to quickly reach the ferry terminal at Charitas, allowing for faster journey times to Rio de Janeiro City. Buses that use this corridor also run in mixed-traffic when off the arterial road.

The city centre, Icaraí, Fonseca, São Francisco and Ingá also have bus lanes. The bus corridor in Fonseca is 6.5 km (4.0 mi) long and includes a total of 10 bus bays along its entire length. There are also bus bays in the city centre.

Roberto Silveira bus station is the arrival and departure point for most Niterói coach buses and is located in the city centre. This bus station has 53 lines, of which 17 are inter-state. Destinations include São Paulo, Belo Horizonte, Vitória, Salvador and Foz do Iguaçu.

=== Ferry ===
Araribóia ferry terminal

Ferries run between Praça Araribóia and Praça XV, and between Charitas and Praça XV; Praça XV is located in Rio de Janeiro. In 2025, the Praça Araribóia-Praça XV route carried approximately 29,000 passengers per day, while the Charitas-Praça XV route carried approximately 4000 passengers per day. The Praça Araribóia-Praça XV route uses two classes of ferry, one which carries up to 1300 passengers and another which carries up to 2000 passengers; The ferries on the Charitas-Praça XV route carry up to 350 passengers.

The Praça Araribóia ferry terminal has a bicycle garage with a capacity of 850 bicycles, as well as 20 charging points for e-bikes. The Charitas ferry terminal also has a bicycle garage with a capacity of 400 bicycles. Cyclists can also take their bicycles onto the ferries themselves: The Praça XV-Praça Araribóia route carries approximately 35,000 bicycles per month, while the Charitas-Praça XV route carries approximately 1800 per month.

=== Bicycle ===
NitBike station at Praça Araribóia

Niterói is rated as the best cycling city in Latin America by the Copenhagenize Index. It has approximately 98 km (61 mi) of bicycle infrastructure as of 2026: This includes 44 km (27 mi) of segregated cycle tracks, 28 km (17 mi) of sharrows, 23 km (14 mi) of roadside bike lanes and 3.7 km (2.3 mi) of shared-use paths. Attention is also given by the city to bicycle parking: Shopping malls, universities and newly-built residential and commercial buildings are required by law to include bicycle parking facilities. The city has over 500 sets of bicycle parking racks, approximately 90% of which have an inverted U shape. There are also 10 public bicycle repair stations in the city centre. Niterói has 10 bicycle counters; As of 2026, Avenida Marquês do Paraná and Avenida Roberto Silveira each register approximately 5000 bicycles per day, making them the two busiest cycling routes in the country.

The city runs a docked bicycle-sharing system called NitBike with 65 stations as of October 2026. Bicycle trips on this system are free for the first hour and paid for longer journeys. There are approximately 150,000 registered users and 180,000 journeys per month.

=== Train ===
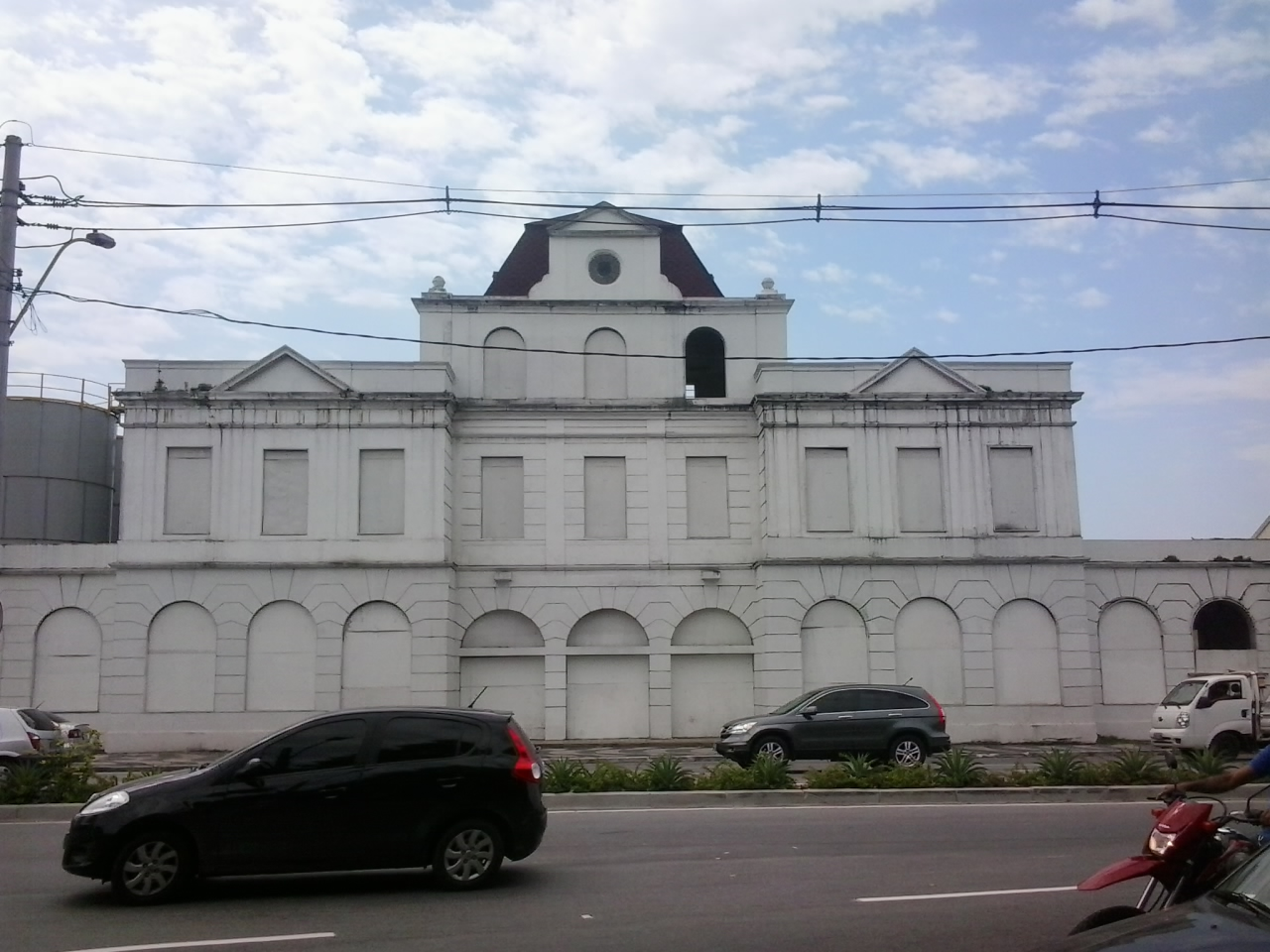
General Dutra railway station

Niterói does not have any rail as of 2026, but was an important railway terminus during the 19th and 20th centuries. In 1873, the Companhia Ferro-Carril Niteroiense first opened a rail line from Santana de Maruí station in Niterói to Vila Nova station in Itaboraí, where it connected to an existing railway going towards Nova Friburgo via Cachoeiras de Macacu. This rail line opened with three intermediate stations in São Gonçalo. From Itaboraí, the railway was extended to Tanguá in 1878, Rio Bonito in 1880 and Macaé in 1888, where it connected to an already-existing line to Campos dos Goytacazes. This railway was acquired by the Leopoldina Railway in 1887 and added to its growing network in Rio de Janeiro and Minas Gerais. By 1898, there were also trains running from Niterói to Cordeiro, Itaocara, Macuco and Sumidouro via Nova Friburgo. An infill station in Barreto had opened by 1901. The line from Campos dos Goytacazes was extended to Vitória in 1907. A branch line from Magé to Itaboraí opened in 1926, thereby connecting Niterói to Rio de Janeiro via the Northern end of Guanabara Bay. A 1.5 km (0.93 mi) extension from Santana do Maruí to a new station on reclaimed land in the Port of Niterói opened in 1930. This station was renamed General Dutra after the then-President in 1949. Beginning in 1962, a local commuter train started running daily between General Dutra and Visconde de Itaboraí (in Itaboraí).

In 1895, the Estrada de Ferro Maricá (Maricá Railroad) was extended from Alcântara to Neves in São Gonçalo, approximately 900 m (3,000 ft) from Niterói. By 1909, the Leopoldina Railway was also stopping at Neves. The Maricá Railroad was extended east from Maricá to Araruama via Saquarema in 1913, Iguaba Grande in 1914 and Cabo Frio via São Pedro da Aldeia in 1937. The Maricá Railroad started through-running onto the Leopoldina Railway's line into Niterói by 1957; In doing so, it abandoned its terminal station in Neves. Most of the Maricá Railroad was abandoned in 1962, with trains continuing to run between General Dutra and Virajaba (in São Gonçalo) until 1966.

In line with the military dictatorship's decision to abandon the railway network, services between Niterói and Nova Friburgo were abandoned in 1964. Services to Cachoeiras de Macacu were abandoned in 1971. The same year, General Dutra station was closed so that the tracks leading out of it could be removed to make way for the under-construction Rio-Niterói bridge; Trains to and from Niterói went back to terminating at Santana do Maruí. The train from Niterói to Vitória via Campos was cut in 1976, making the commuter train to Itaboraí via São Gonçalo the only remaining rail service in Niterói. This 33 km (21 mi) commuter train route ran until 2007, with an 8 month interruption in 2004-2005. By 2005, it had 14 stations and ran 4 times per day in each direction using a GE U12C locomotive running with a maximum speed of 20 km/h (12 mph). There have been plans and proposals to replace this rail line with a new metro line since 1968, but, as of 2026, construction has not started.

== Sports ==
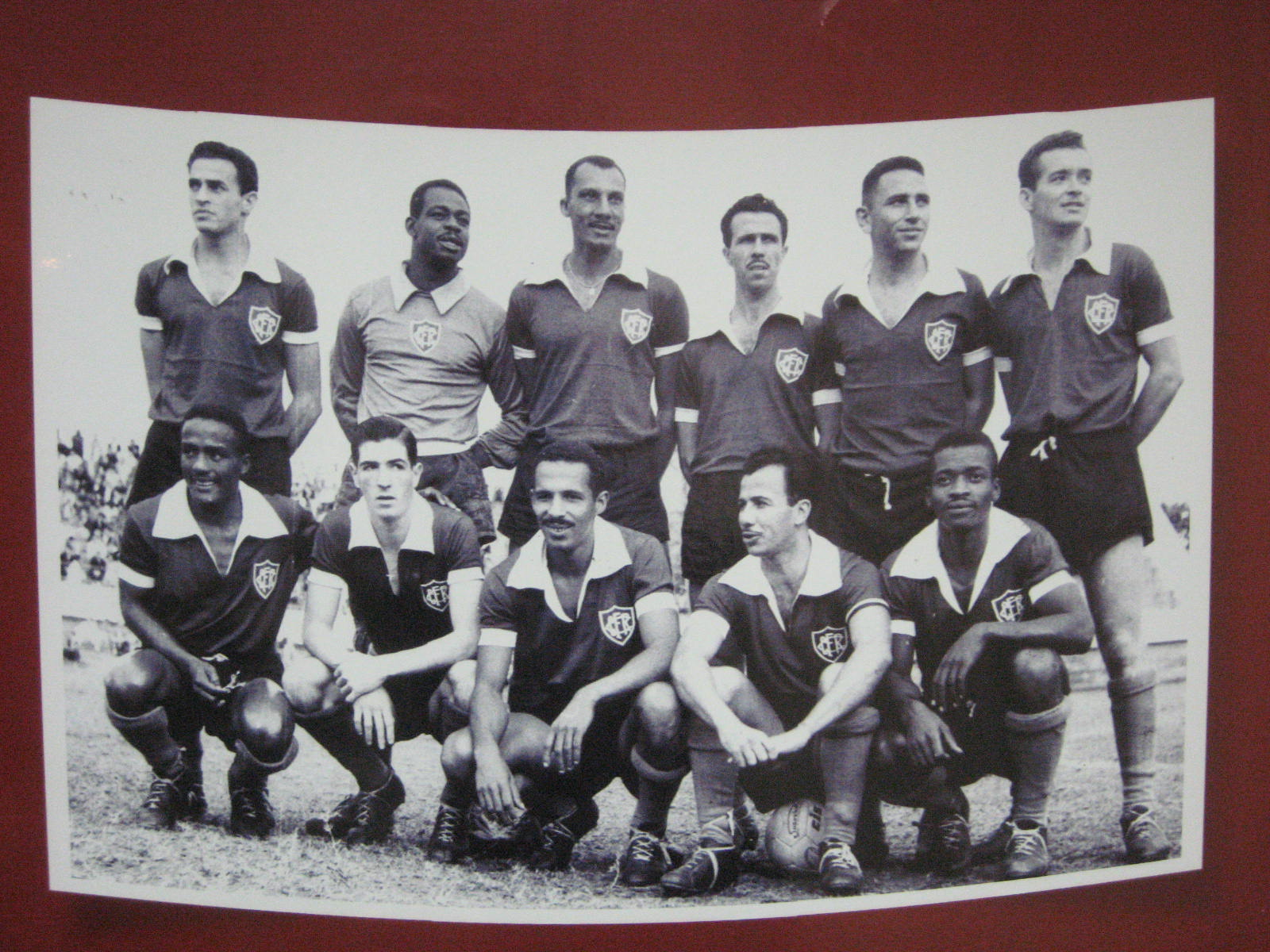
Canto do Rio Foot-Ball Club in 1956

Besides being hometown of stars like Leonardo, Edmundo and Gérson, the city is also homeland of the Canto do Rio Foot-Ball Club, which was founded in 1913 and was the only club outside the city of Rio de Janeiro to participate in the Rio de Janeiro Championship in the 1940s. The club also had its anthem composed by Lamartine Babo, composer of the anthems for every participant of the Rio de Janeiro Championship of 1941 due to a radio campaign. The city is not currently represented in the elite of national football.

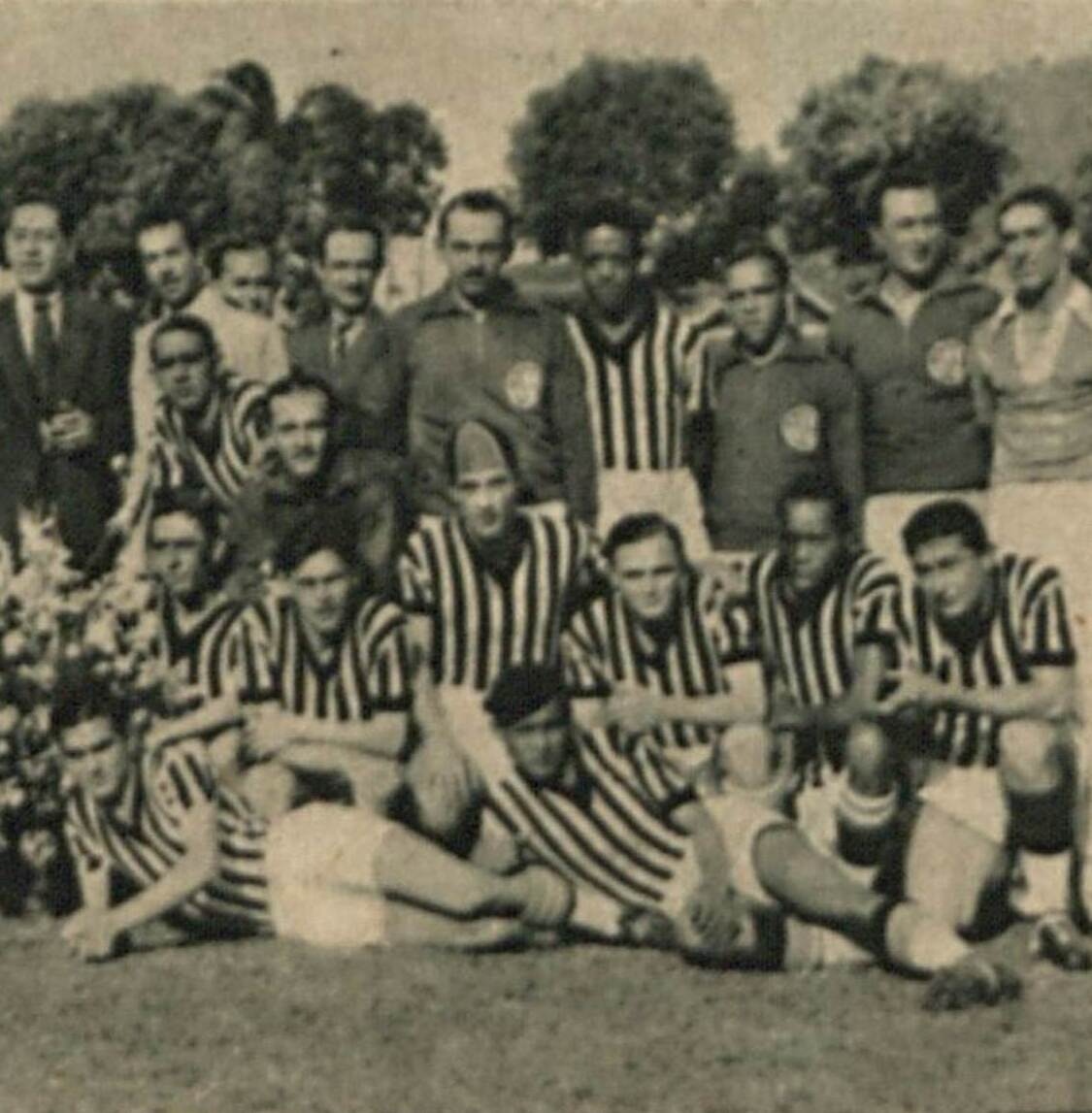
Niteroiense Futebol Clube in 1937

Other football clubs in the city are the Niteroiense Futebol Clube, which recently announced its return to professional football, the Fonseca Atlético Clube and the Rio Cricket and Athletic Association, which participated in the first championship in Rio, reaching third place and having the championship set in its stadium. Rio Cricket also participated in (possibly) the first rivalry of Rio de Janeiro's football, with Paissandu Atlético Clube, a club in the city of Rio de Janeiro, which was founded by Rio Cricket founders and has a Rio de Janeiro Championship title.

The city also has the Caio Martins Stadium, which is located in the Santa Rosa neighborhood and has for years been the home of Canto do Rio and more recently Botafogo in the 2000s. In 2007, the stadium's gymnasium was the stage of the final of the Feminine Superleague of Volleyball, that finished with victory of the team of Rio de Janeiro. Nowadays, the stadium is used for training of Botafogo and in games scheduled by the FFERJ – mostly, in championships of inferior divisions.

== Administrative divisions ==
From 1943 to the late 1970s, the municipality of Niteroi comprised two districts only: the district of Niteroi (original area) and the district of Itaipu (acquired in 1943), which barely had an urban continuity or even proper road links to each other and were considered apart areas. The fractioning of Itaipu's farms into real estates as well its boom after the building of the Rio-Niterói's bridge demanded a better integration between the two sides of the municipality which led to the improving of the roads and urban facilities and a reformation on the make up of Niteroi's administrative division. The municipality was reorganized into five districts. In the early 1990s, the administrative division of Niterói was altered once again, being the municipality now divided into twelve administrative, further subdivided into 52 bairros (neighborhoods) and 5 Regiões de Planejamento ("Planning Regions").

Praias da Baía	Norte	Oceânica	Pendotiba	Leste
Bairro de Fátima	Baldeador	Cafubá	Badu	Muriqui
Boa Viagem	Barreto	Camboinhas	Cantagalo	Rio do Ouro
Cachoeiras	Caramujo	Engenho do Mato	Ititioca	Várzea das Moças
Centro	Cubango	Itacoatiara	Largo da Batalha	
Charitas	Engenhoca	Itaipu	Maceió	
Gragoatá	Fonseca	Jacaré	Maria Paula	
Icaraí	Ilha da Conceição	Jardim Imbuí	Matapaca	
Ingá	Santa Bárbara	Maravista	Sapê	
Jurujuba	Santana	Piratininga	Vila Progresso	
Morro do Estado	São Lourenço	Santo Antônio		
Pé Pequeno	Tenente Jardim	Serra Grande		
Ponta d'Areia	Viçoso Jardim			
Santa Rosa				
São Domingos				
São Francisco				
Viradouro				
Vital Brazil				

== Notable people ==
- Alex Rodrigo Dias da Costa – footballer
- André Marques – TV show host, entertainer
- Murilo Benicio - popular actor
- Baby Consuelo – singer
- Benjamin Constant – politician
- Daniel Lins Cortês – footballer
- Dedé Santana – former Brazilian comedian
- Edinho – former footballer
- Edmundo – footballer
- Fernanda Keller – triathlete, Ironman winner
- Gérson – footballer
- Isabel Swan – sailor, Olympic medalist
- Leonardo – former Director of Football for Paris Saint-Germain F.C.
- Lars Grael – sailor, Olympic champion
- Altair – football player
- Juliana Marins - Hiker, Dancer
- Leo Moura – football player
- Manuel de Nóbrega – Brazilian comedian
- Carlos Alberto de Nóbrega – comedian, television host, scriptwriter, producer, executive director, actor and lawyer
- Marcelo Ferreira – athlete (sailing), Olympic medalist
- Martine Grael – sailor, Olympic champion
- Matheus Fernandes – footballer
- Jessé – singer
- Perla Haney-Jardine – actress
- Agnaldo Rayol – singer and actor
- Rafael dos Anjos – mixed martial artist, former UFC lightweight champion
- Joílson Júnior – Greco-Roman wrestler, Pan American Games medalist
- Ricardo Arona – fighter
- Ronaldo Olive – journalist
- Ronnie Von – singer
- Sérgio Mendes - Singer, Songwriter
- Sérgio Pereira da Silva Porto – physicist
- Sheymon Moraes – mixed martial artist
- Torben Grael – sailor, Olympic champion

== Gallery ==
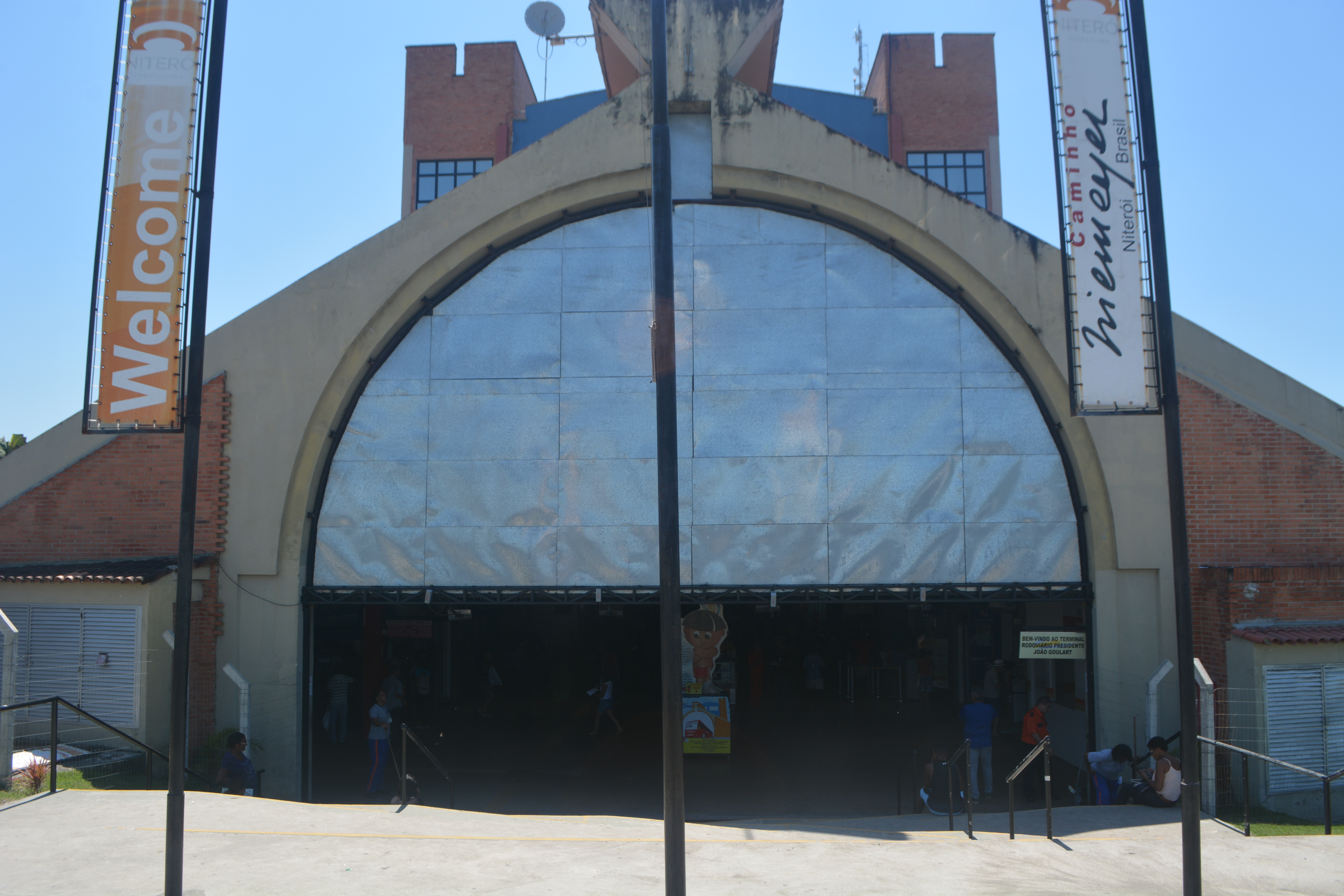
João Goulart Bus Terminal in downtown Niterói

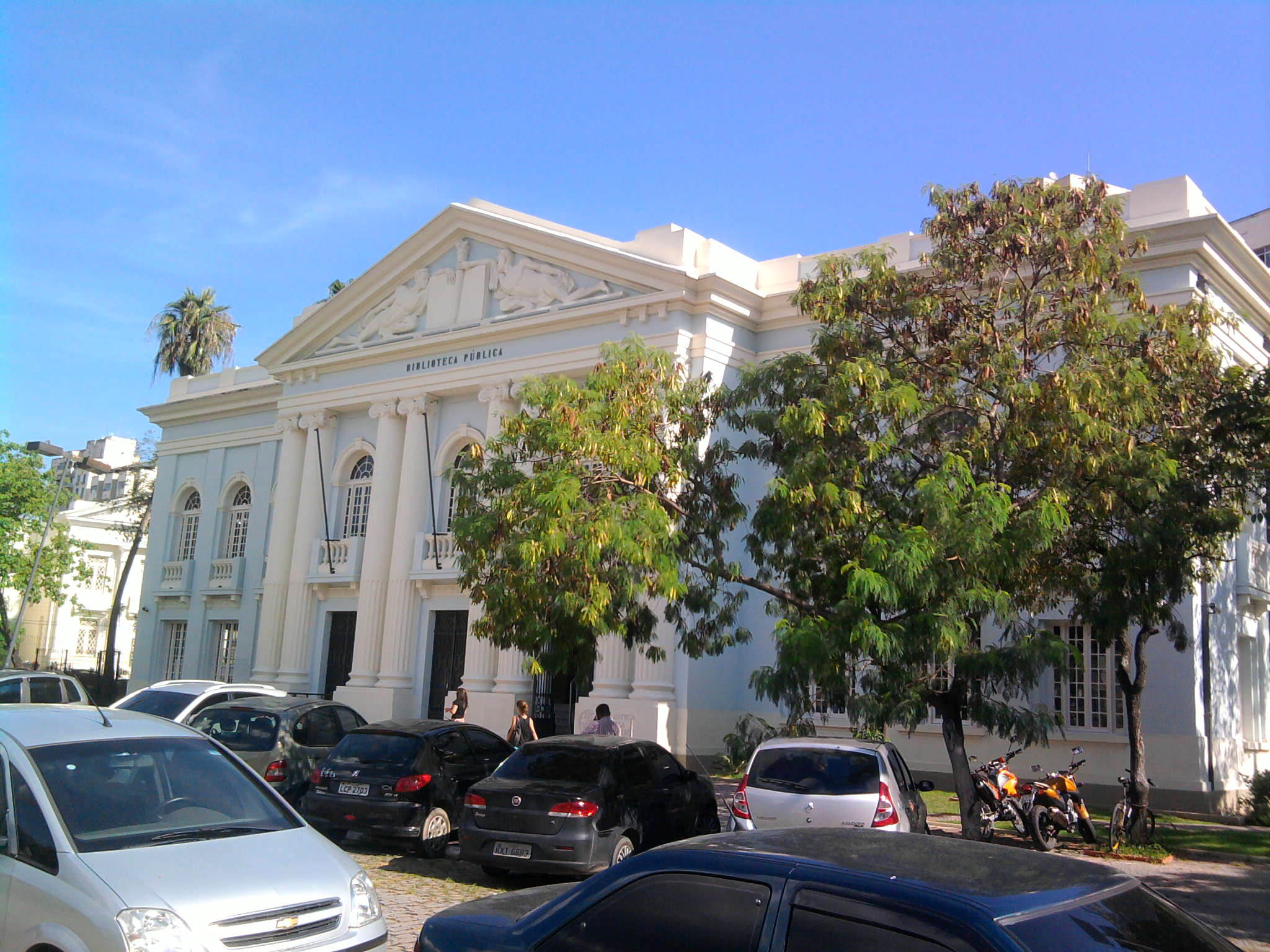
Niterói State Library

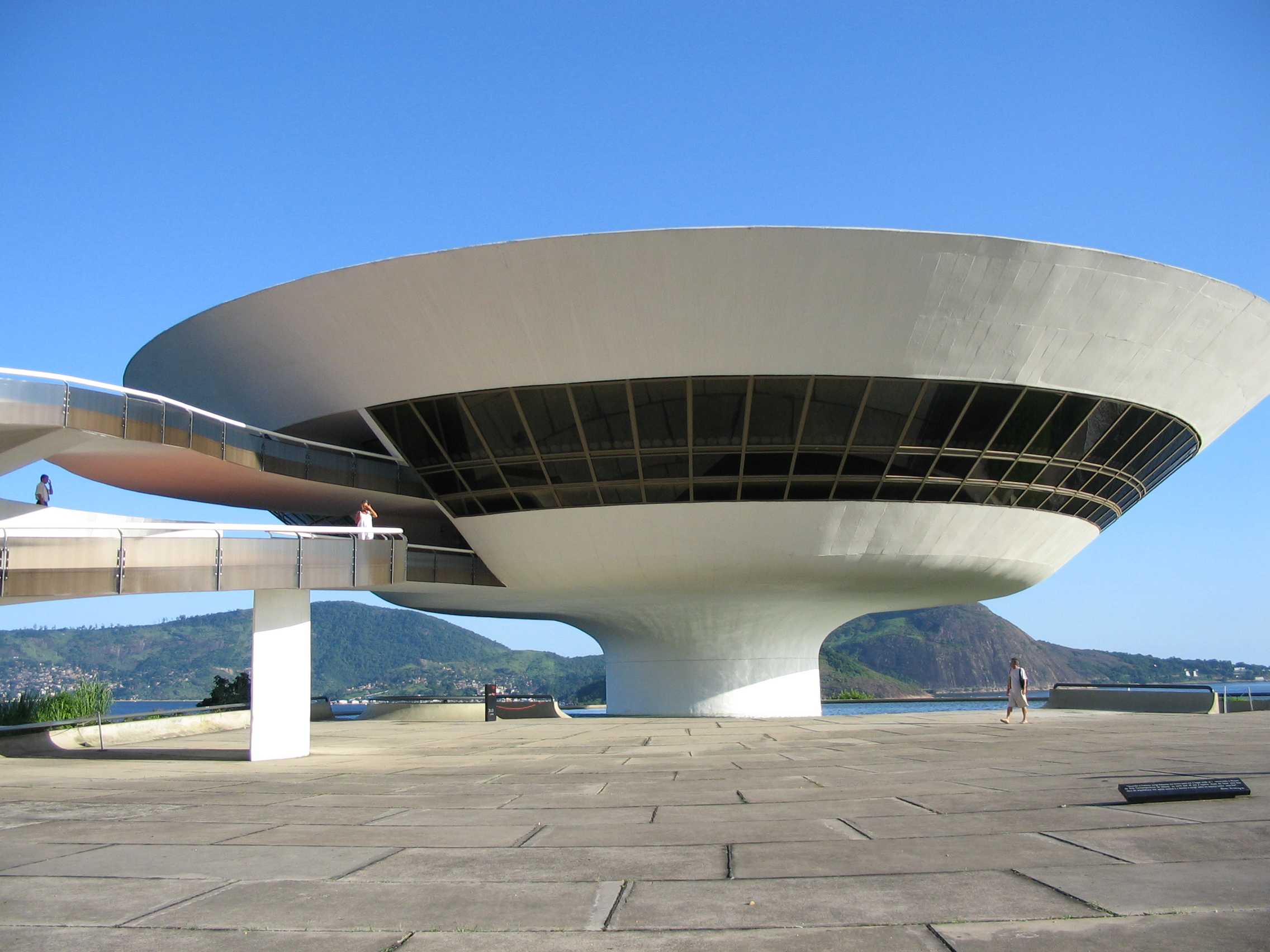
Niterói Contemporary Art Museum

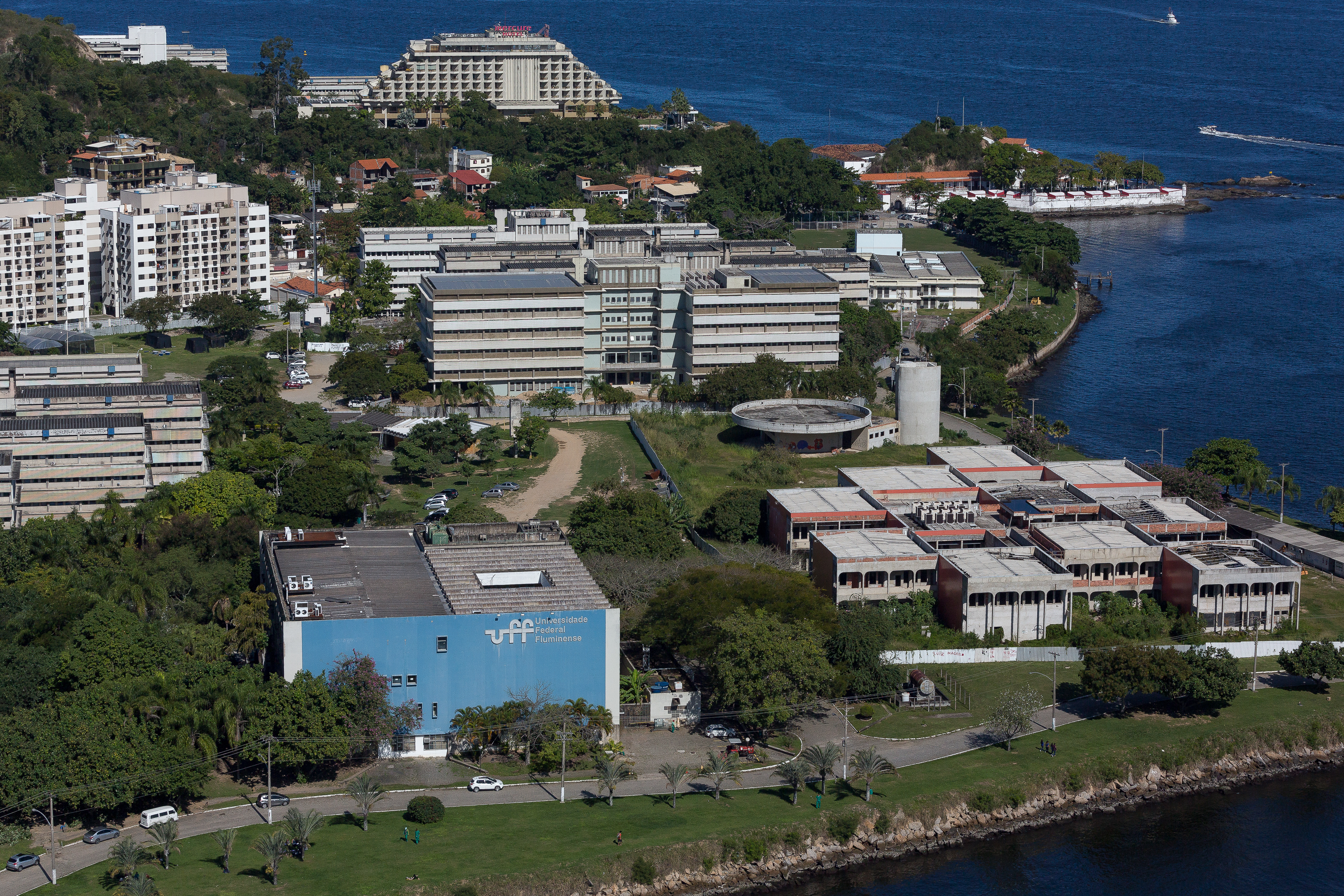
The Gragoatá campus of the Fluminense Federal University

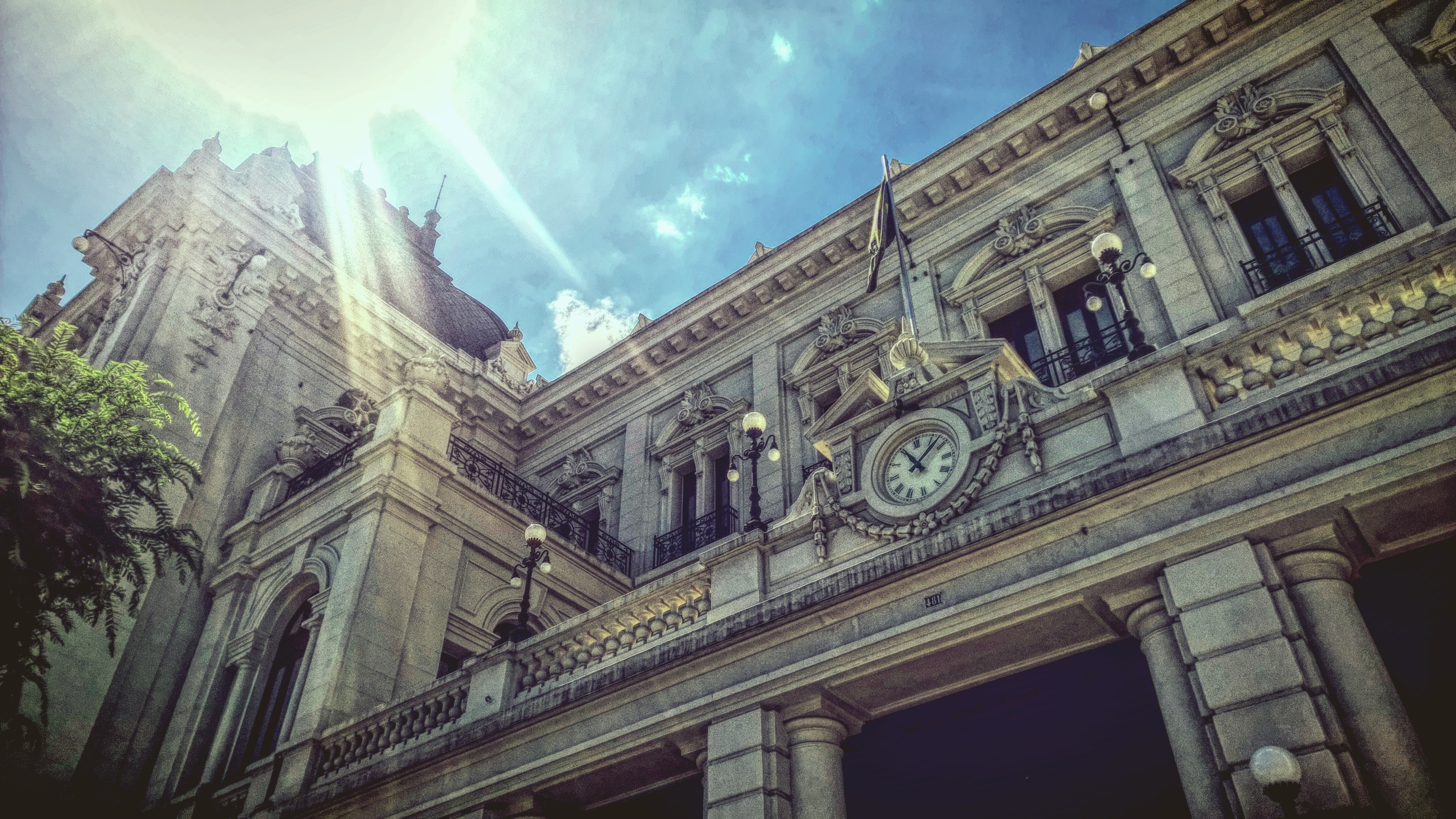
Correios Palace

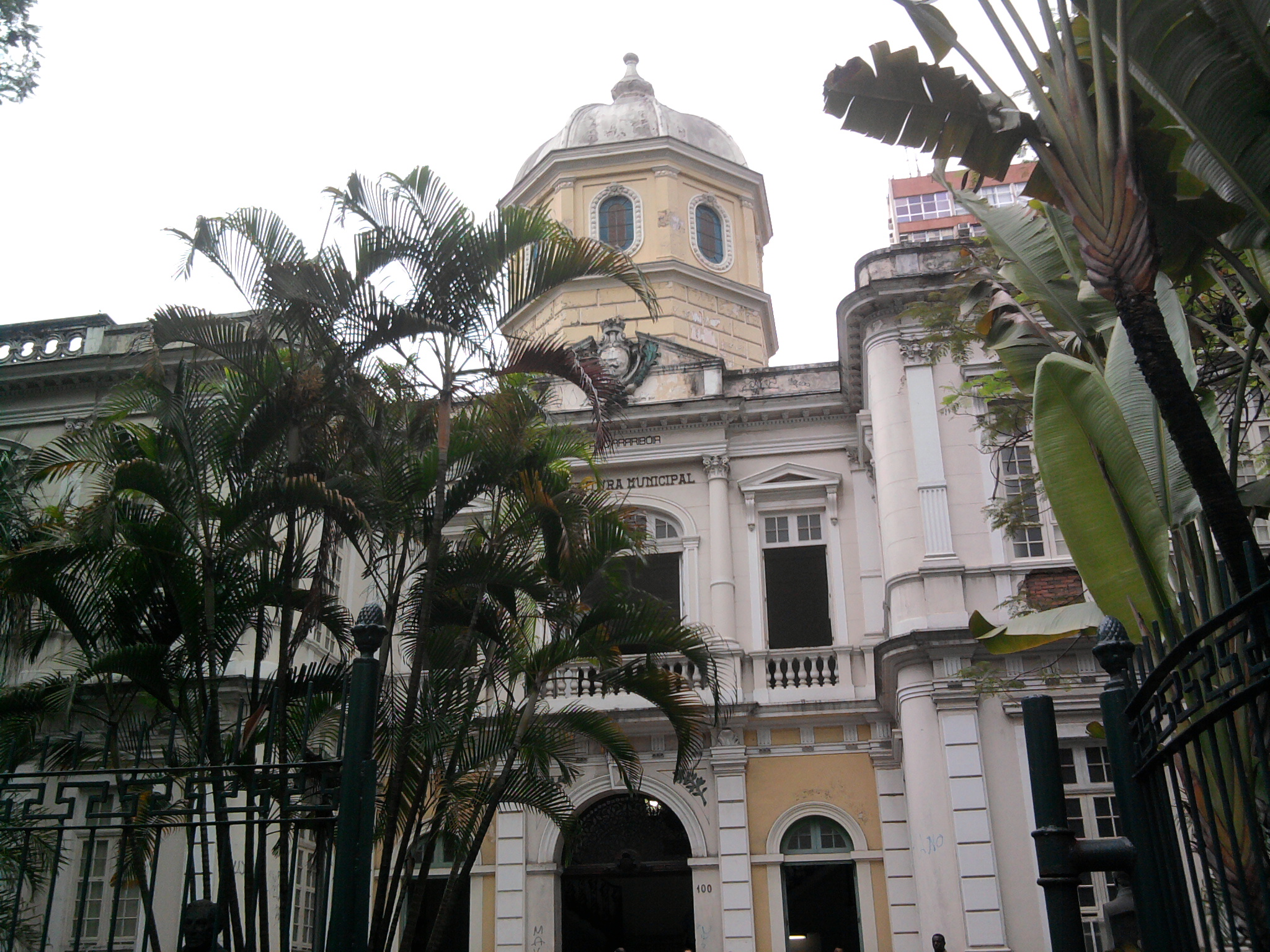
Arariboia Palace

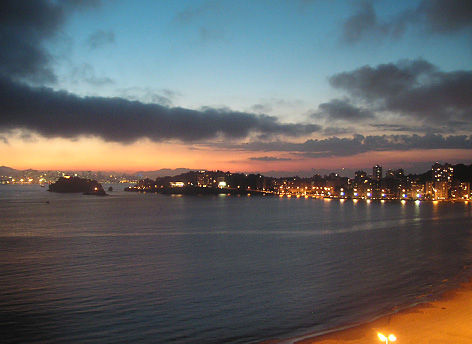
Night view

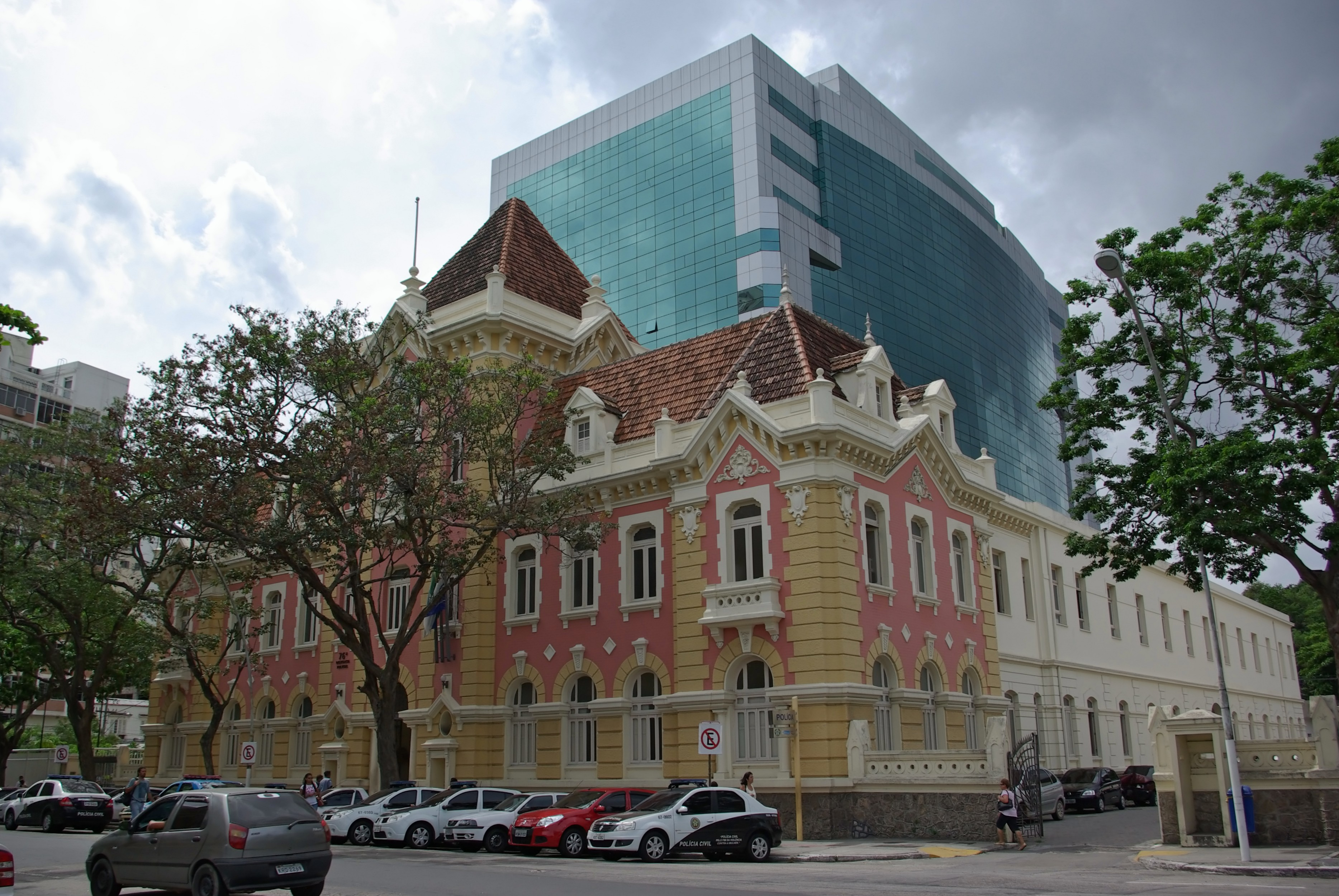
Old and new architecture mingle together in Niterói

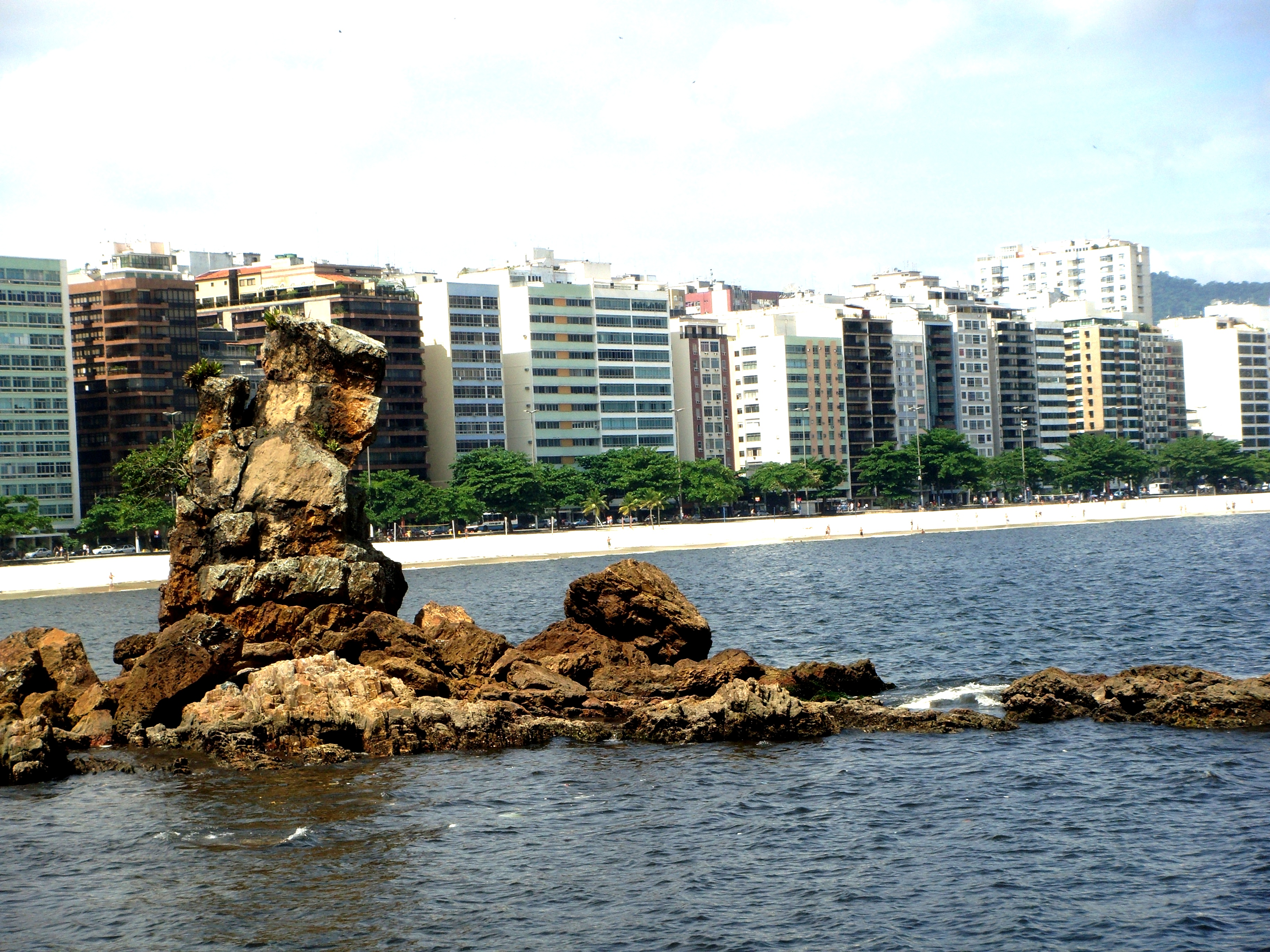
Neighborhood of Icaraí

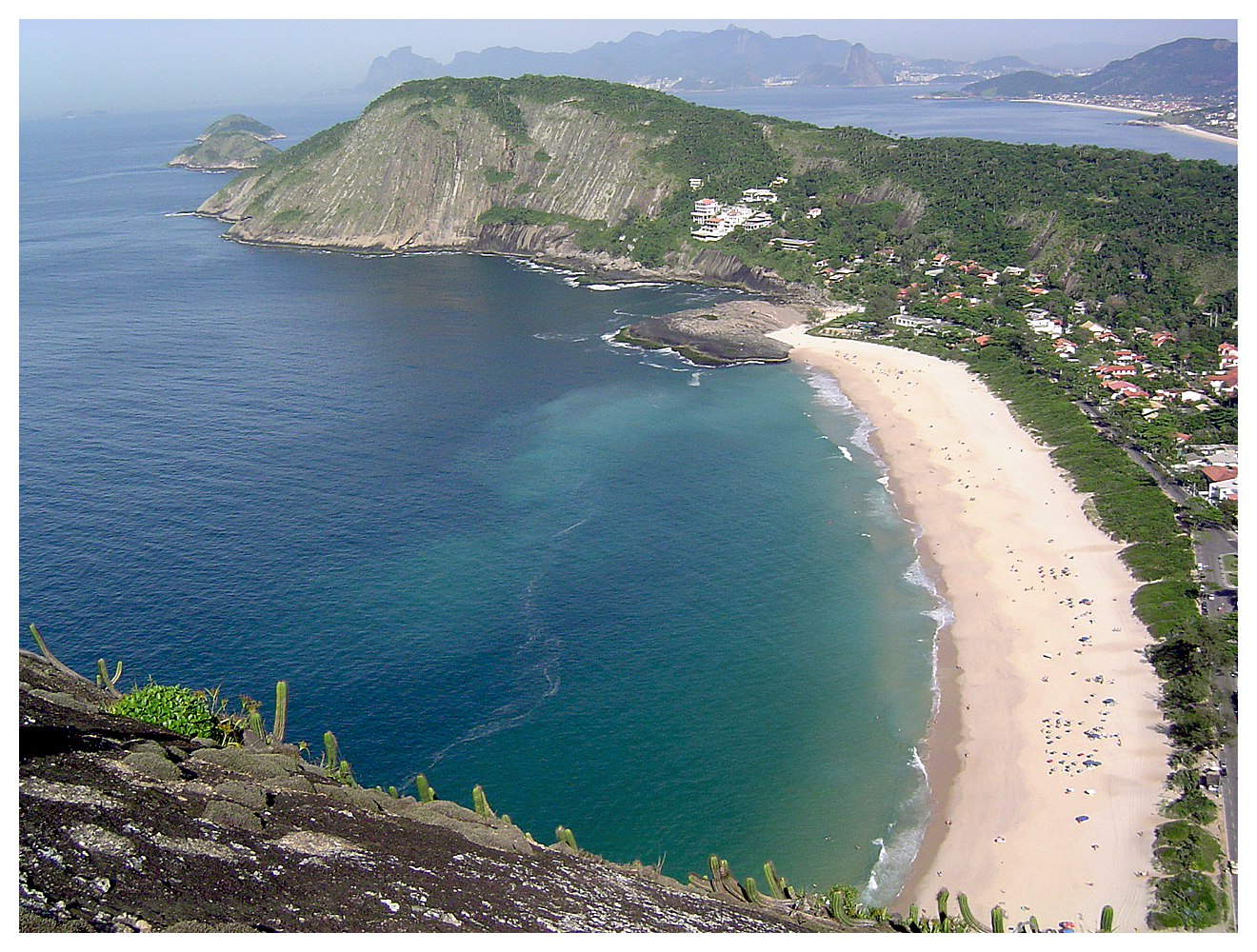
Itacoatiara beach

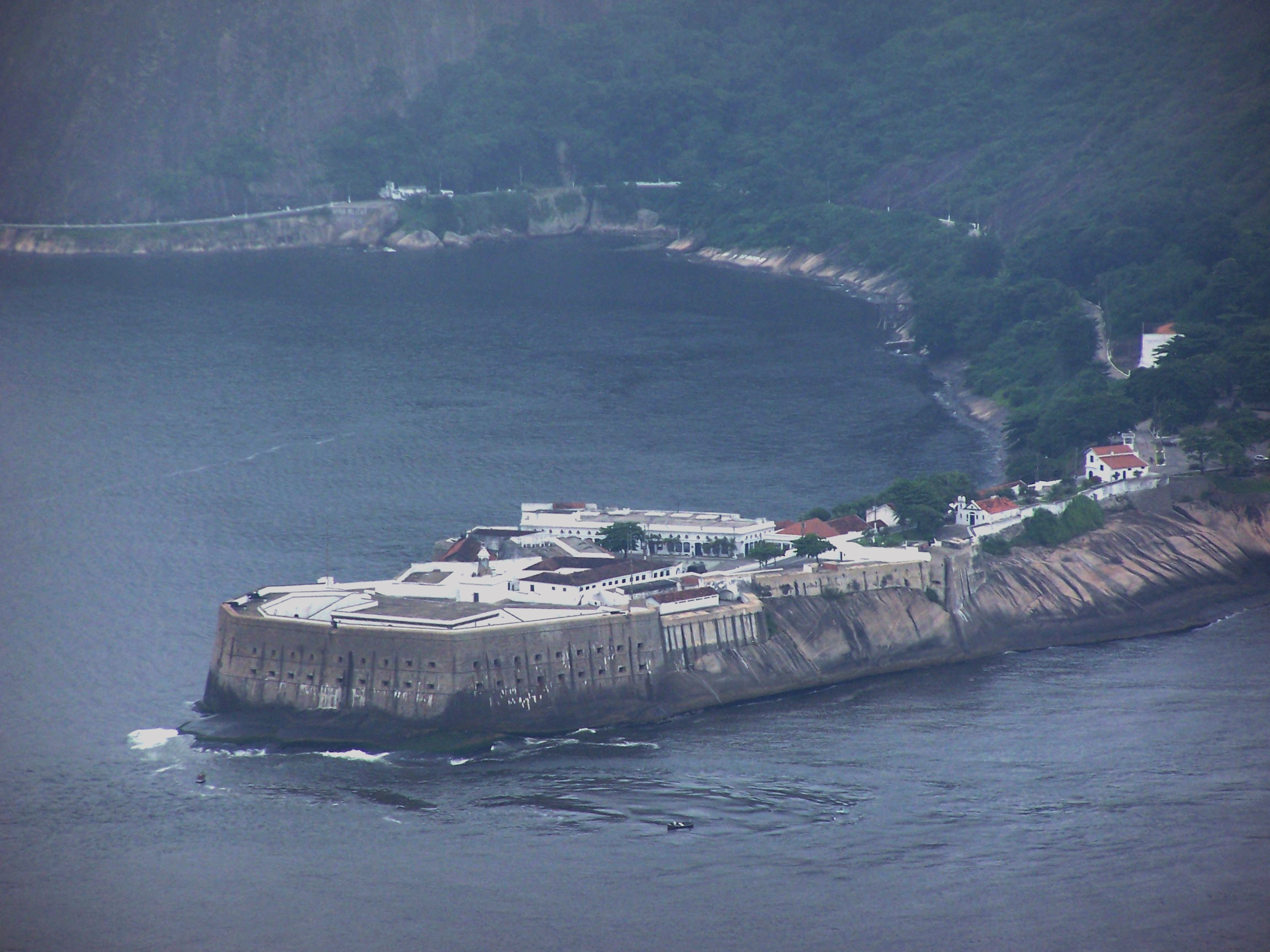
Santa Cruz Fortress

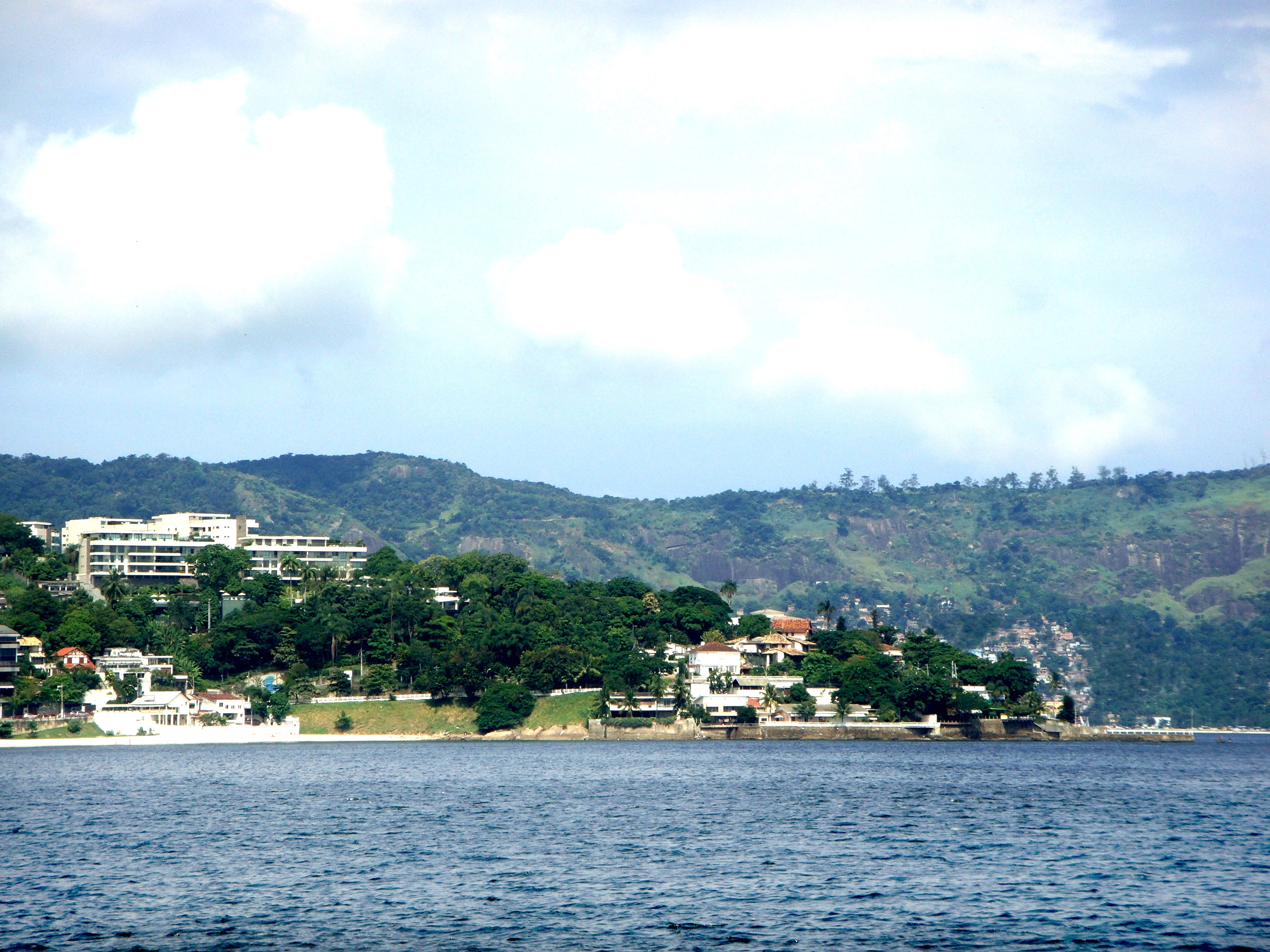
Fróes cove

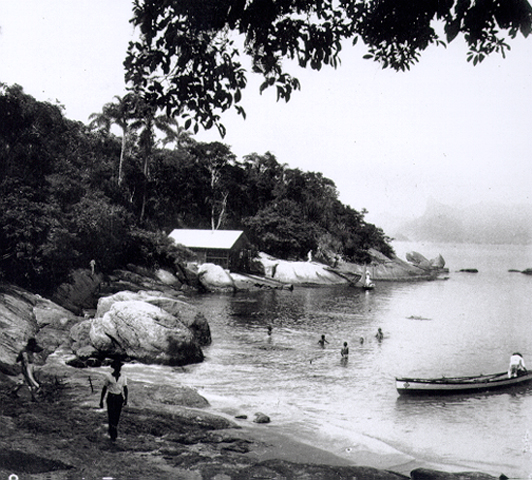
Icaraí beach in 1895

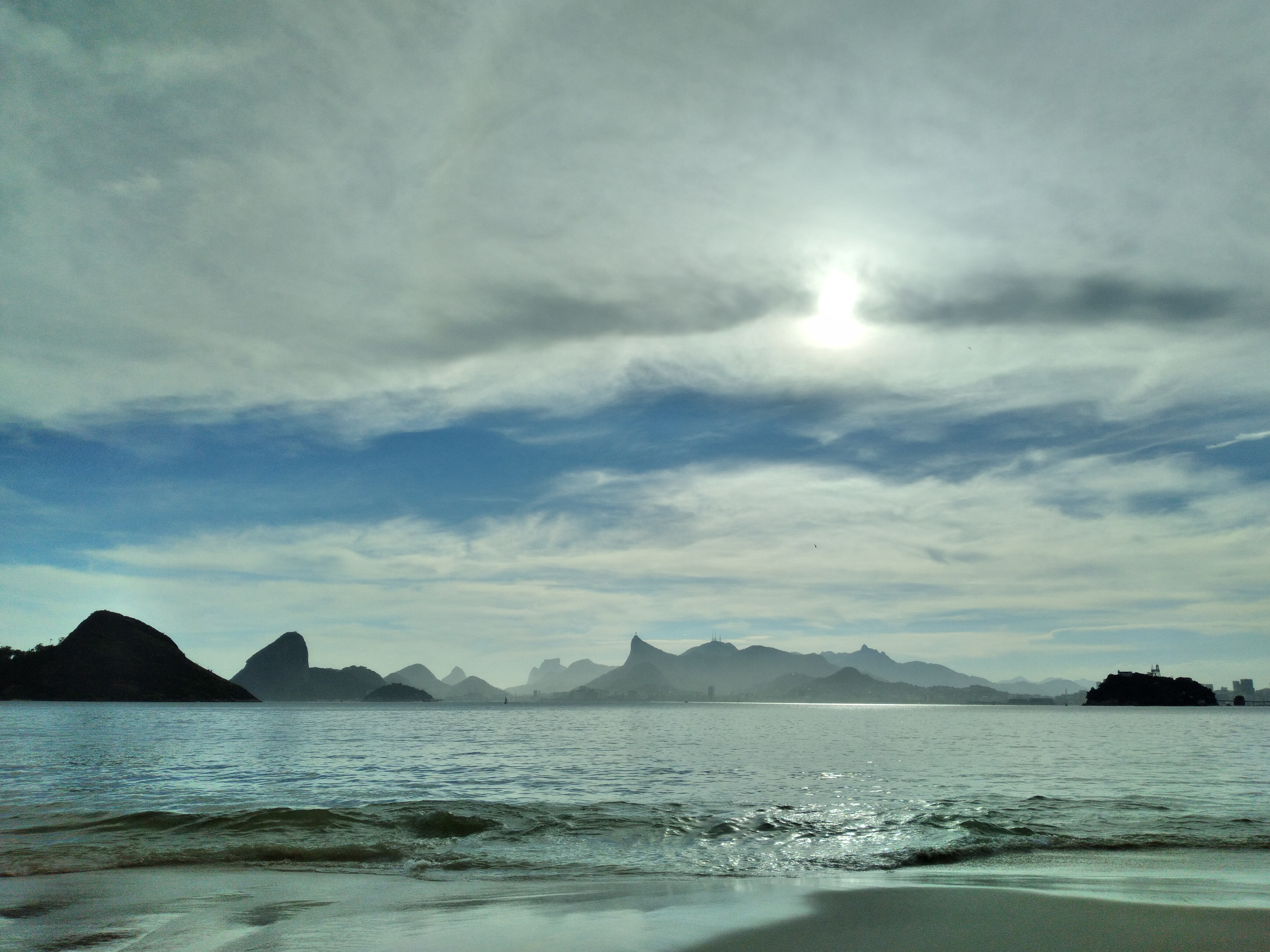
View of Rio de Janeiro from Icaraí beach
