= Icaraí =

Name of beach and surrounding neighborhood in Rio de Janeiro, Brazil

Coordinates: 22.90725°S 43.11018°W

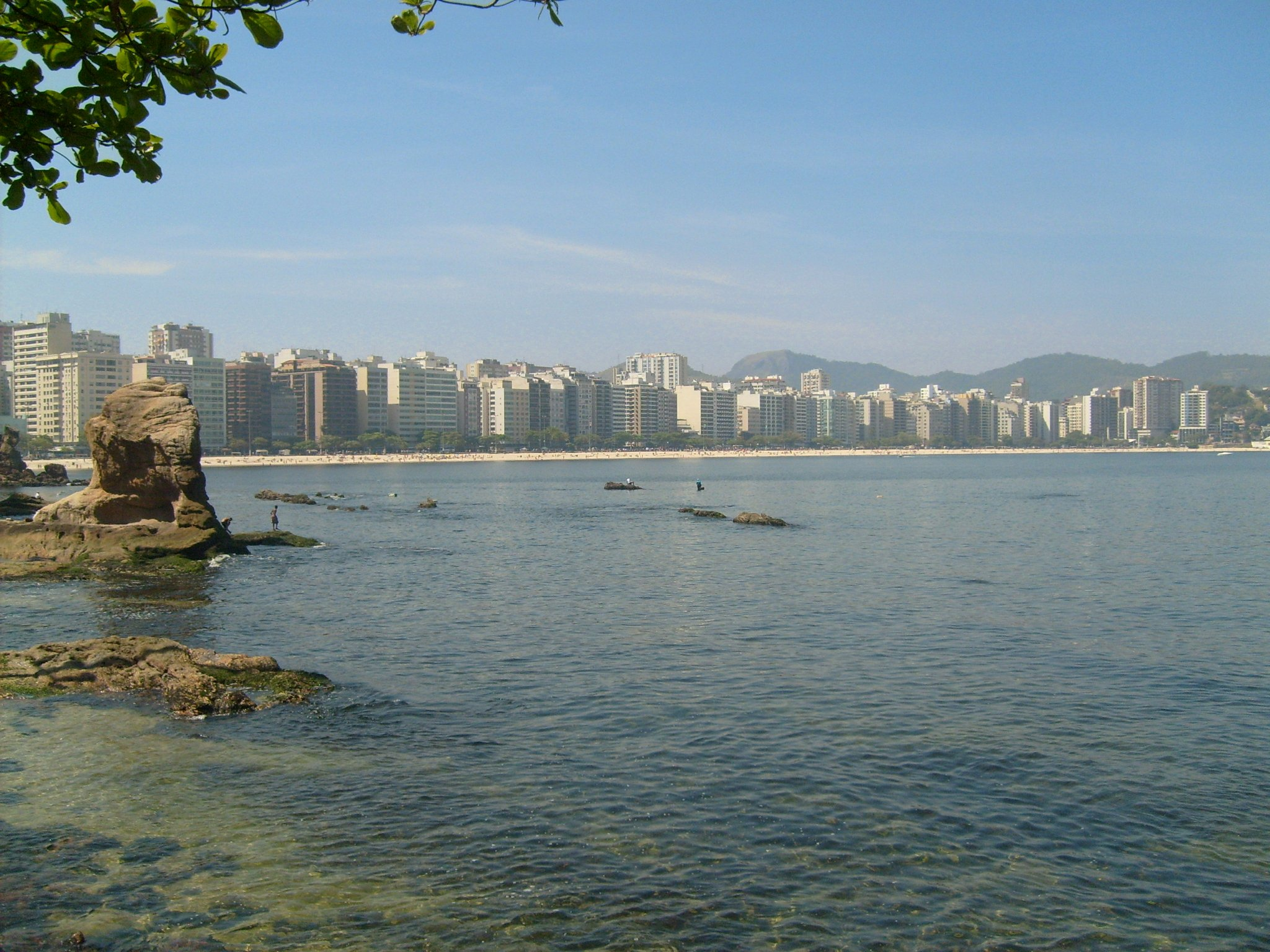
Itapuca stone and Icaraí beach

Icaraí is the name of a beach and its surrounding neighborhood in Niterói, Rio de Janeiro, Brazil.

The origin of the neighborhood dates back to the parish of São João de Carahy and later, with two large estates, the Icaraí estate and the Cavalão estate.

The name "Icaraí" comes from an ancient Tupinambá village called Akara'y (recorded as Acara-u by Jean de Léry). It means "river of acarás", derived from the composition of akará and 'y.
