= Jurujuba =

Coordinates: 22°56′S 43°07′W

Jurujuba is a promontory and one of the 48 administrative districts of Niterói, Rio de Janeiro, Brazil. It is located in the southern zone of the city, situated on the coast of the Guanabara Bay.
