= List of beaches in Brazil =

This is a list of beaches in Brazil.

== Alagoas ==
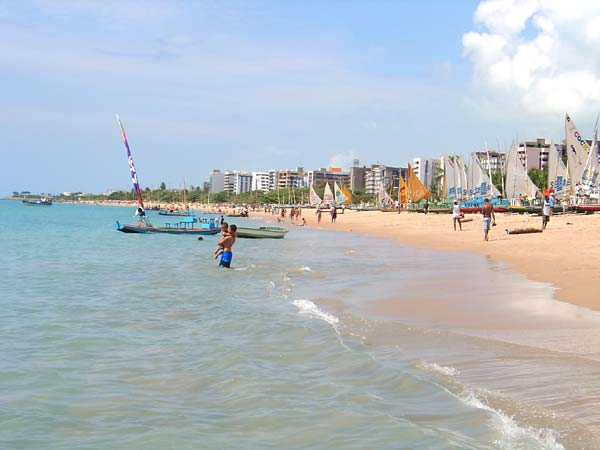
Pajuçara, Maceió, Alagoas.

- Jatiúca
- Pajuçara
- Ponta Verde
- Praia do Gunga

== Amapá ==
- Fazendinha

== Bahia ==
- Itacarezinho
- Mangue Seco
- Porto da Barra
- Praia do Forte

== Ceará ==
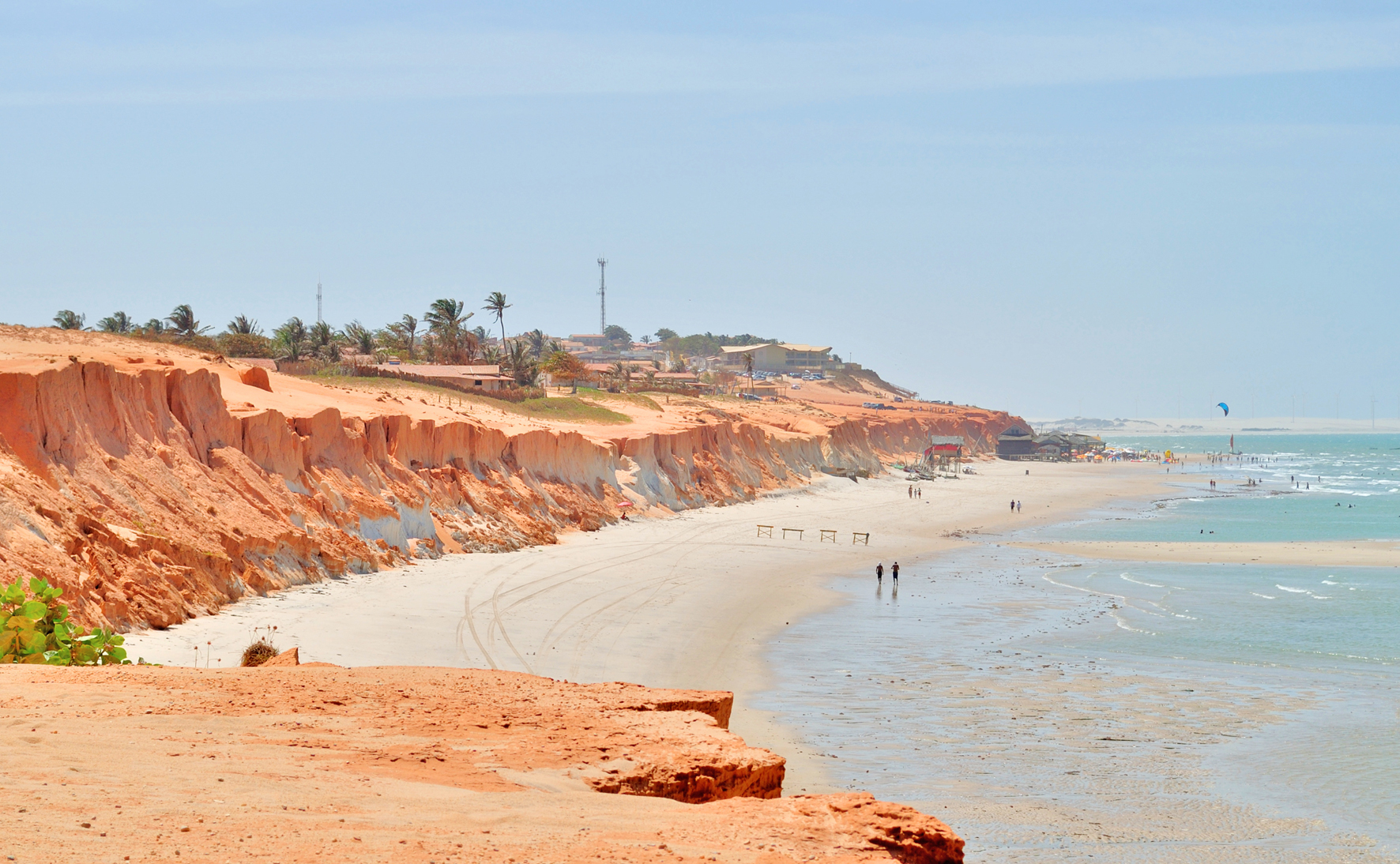
Cliffs in Canoa Quebrada, Aracati, Ceará.

- Canoa Quebrada
- Jericoacoara
- Praia de Iracema

== Espírito Santo ==
- Barra Seca

== Pará ==
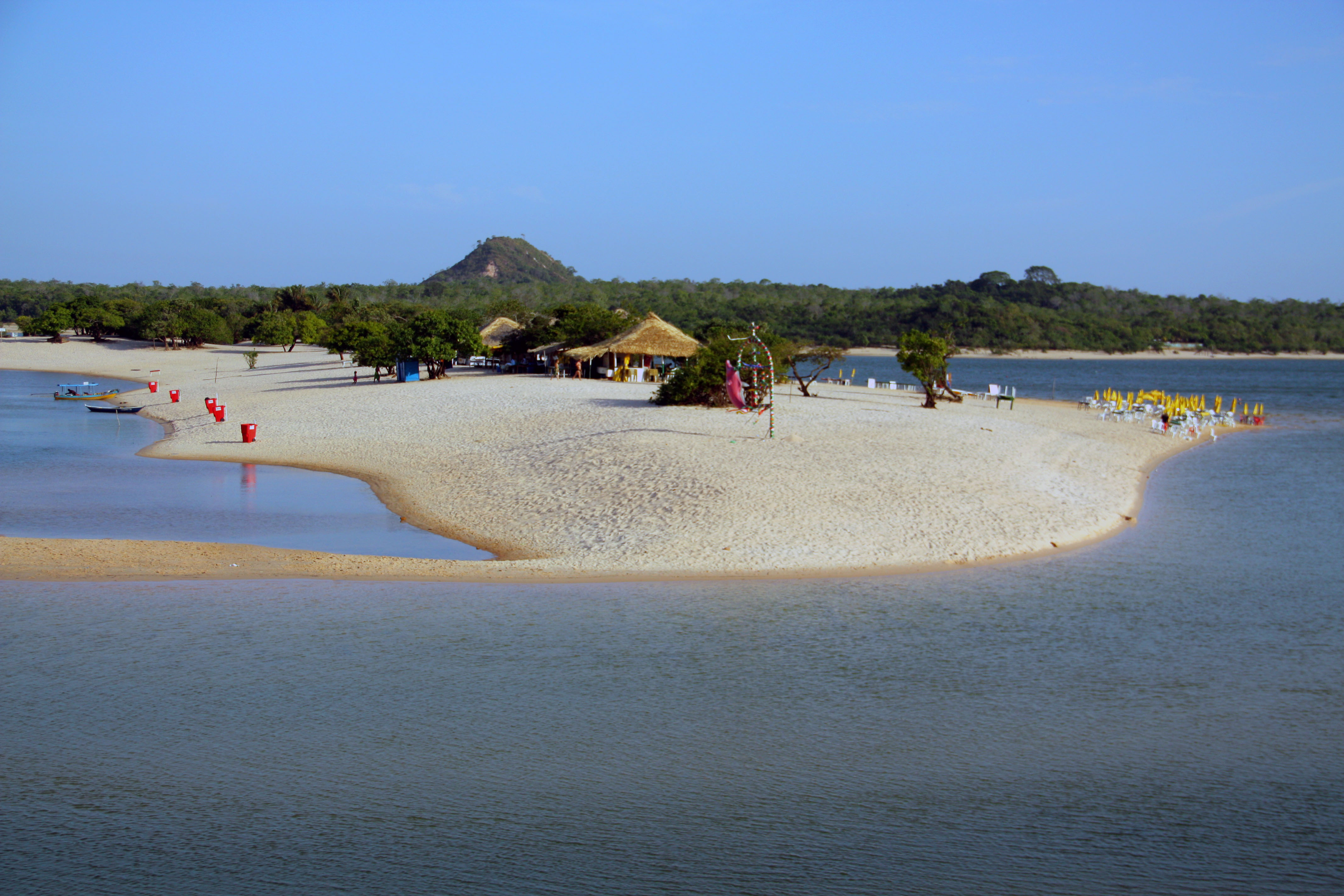
Alter do Chão, Santarém, Pará.

- Alter do Chão
- Mosqueiro

== Paraíba ==
- Tambaba

== Pernambuco ==
- Boa Viagem
- Fernando de Noronha
- Ilha de Itamaracá
- Porto de Galinhas

== Rio de Janeiro ==
=== Rio de Janeiro City ===
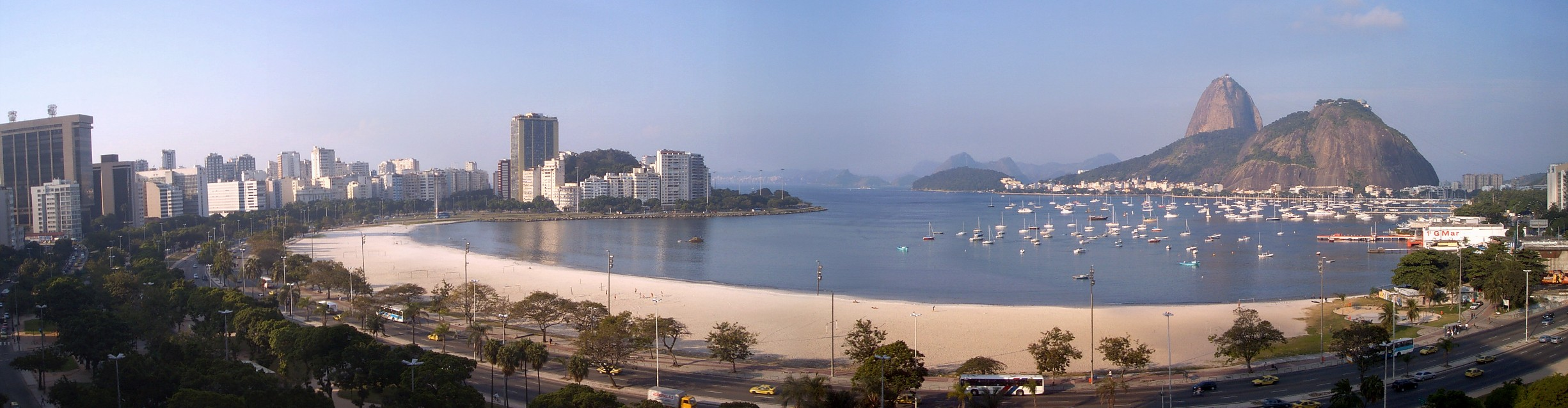
A panoramic view of Praia de Botafogo (Botafogo Beach) with Pão de Açúcar and Morro da Urca in the background.

- Arpoador
- Barra da Tijuca
- Botafogo
- Copacabana
- Flamengo
- Gavea
- Ipanema
- Leblon
- Leme
- São Conrado
- Urca
- Vermelha
- Vidigal

=== Niterói ===
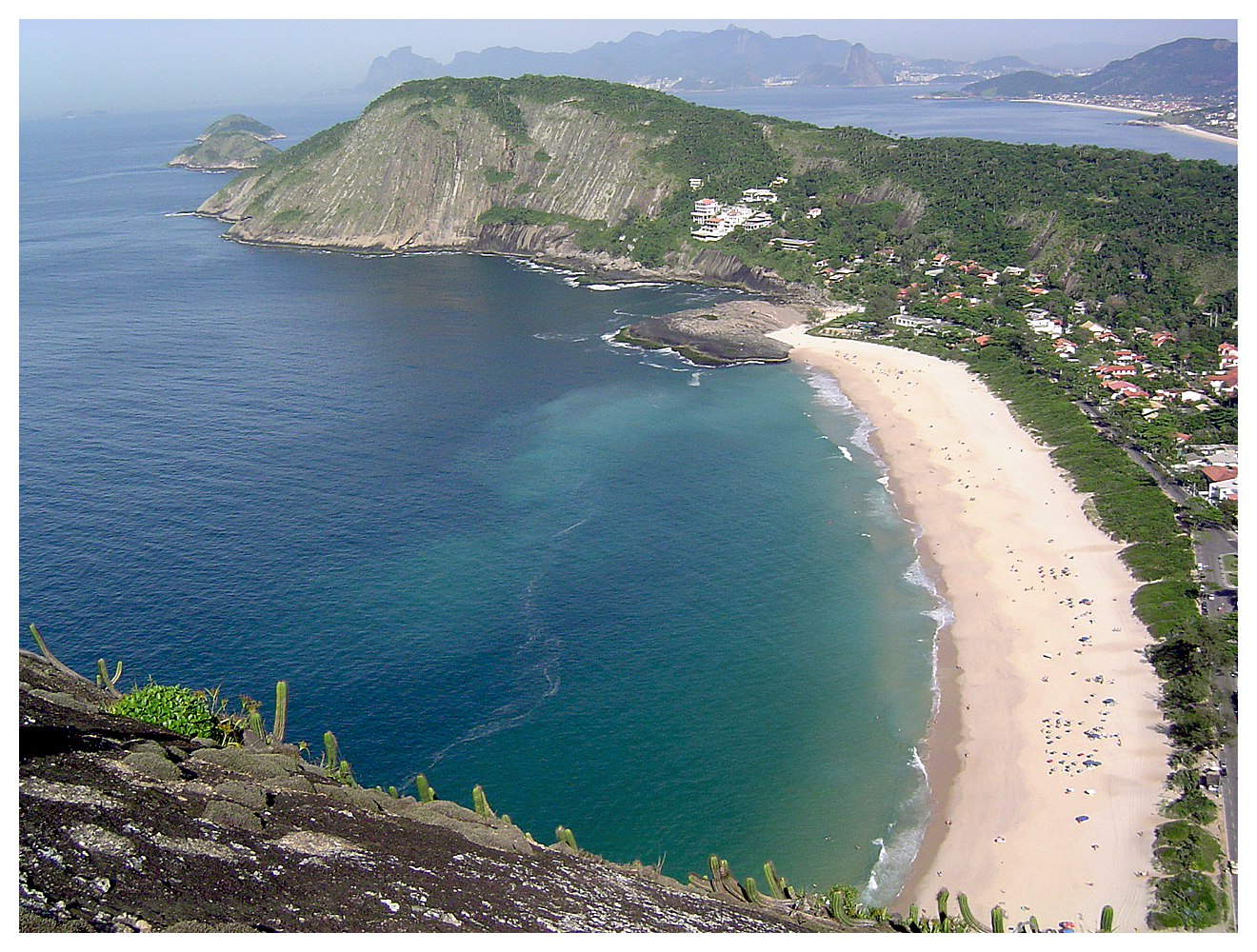
Itacoatiara beach, Niterói.

- Camboinhas
- Charitas
- Gragoatá
- Icaraí
- Itacoatiara
- Itaipu
- Jurujuba
- Piratininga
- São Francisco

=== Other cities ===
- Angra dos Reis
- Búzios
- Cabo Frio
- Paraty
- Trindade

== Rio Grande do Norte ==
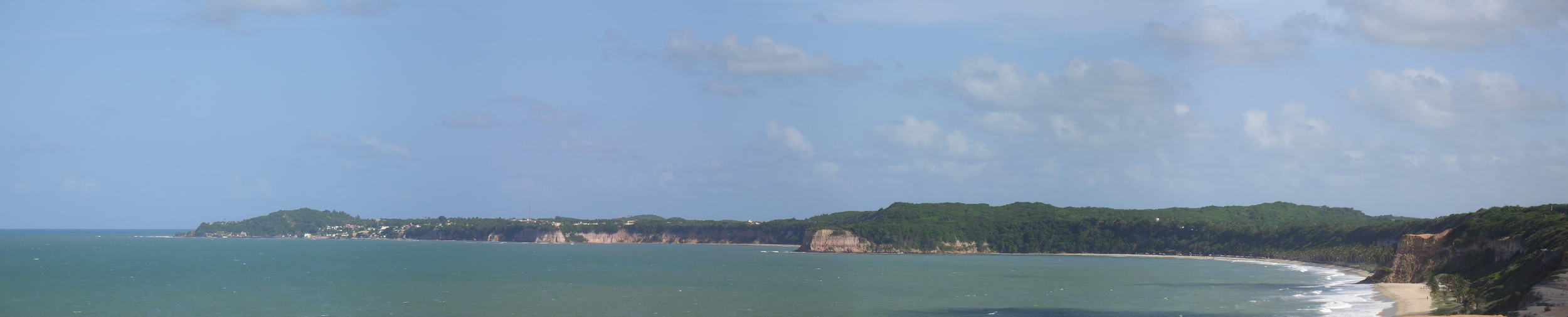
A panoramic image of Pipa Beach.

- Genipabu
- Maracajaú
- Pipa
- Ponta Negra
- Redinha

== Rio Grande do Sul ==
- Barra do Chuí
- Praia da Guarita
- Praia do Cassino

== Santa Catarina ==
=== Florianópolis ===
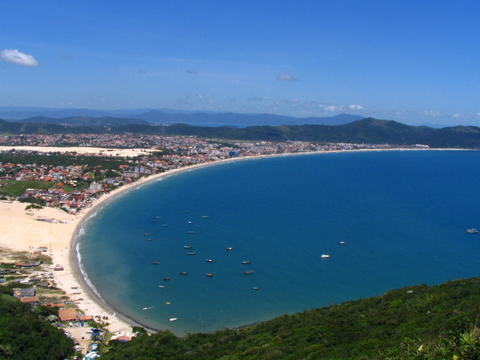
Praia dos Ingleses, Florianópolis, Santa Catarina.

- Barra da Lagoa
- Campeche
- Canasvieiras
- Jurerê
- Mole
- Mozambique
- Praia Brava
- Praia de Naufragados
- Praia do Ervino
- Praia dos Açores
- Praia dos Ingleses
- Santo Antônio de Lisboa

=== Other cities ===
- Itapirubá

== São Paulo ==
=== São Sebastião ===
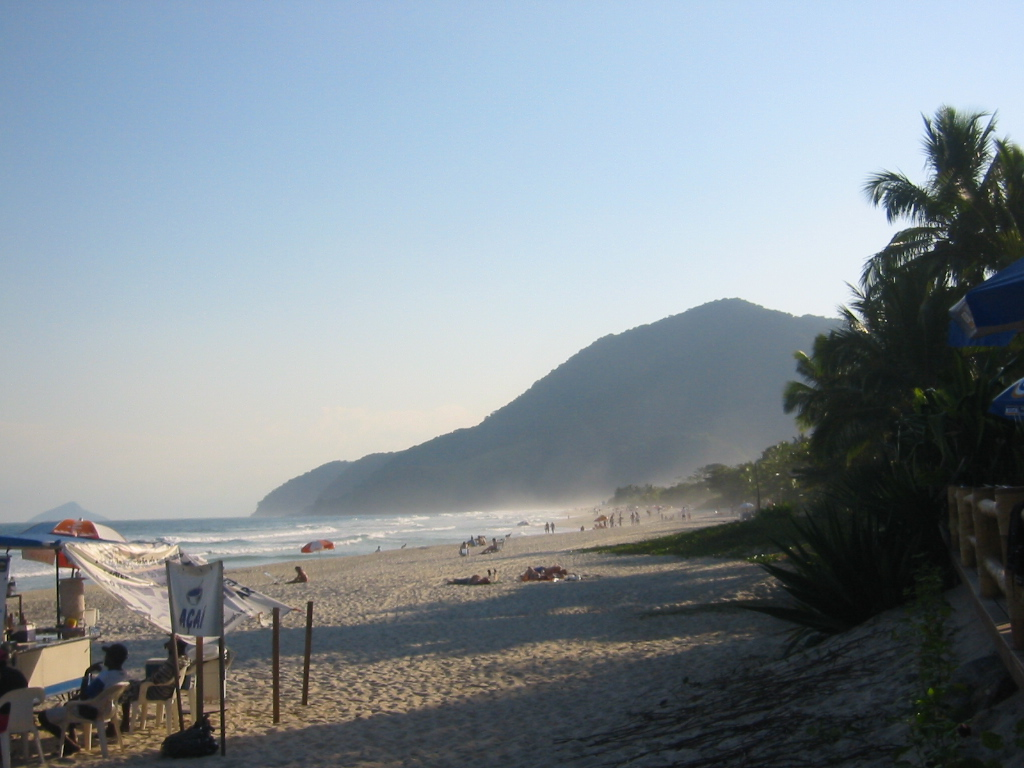
Maresias beach, São Sebastião, São Paulo.

- Barequeçaba
- Boiçucanga
- Juqueí
- Maresias
- Toque-Toque Grande
- Toque-Toque Pequeno

=== Other cities ===
- Guarujá
- Ilhabela
- Ilha Comprida
- Praia Grande
- Santos
- Ubatuba

== See also ==
- List of beaches
- List of beaches in Pernambuco, a state of Brazil
- List of beaches in Rio Grande do Norte, a state of Brazil
