= Praia do Ervino =

Beach in Brazil

Praia do Ervino (Ervino Beach) is a beach located in the municipality of São Francisco do Sul in the Brazilian state of Santa Catarina, located at the right corner of Praia Grande. The beach is somewhat popular among tourists of the area, but experiences less traffic than many similar ones, due to a more isolated location and lack of tourist infrastructure compared to other parts of Brazil. Despite this, the beach is popular among many fishing and surfing enthusiasts, as it is located at the open sea.

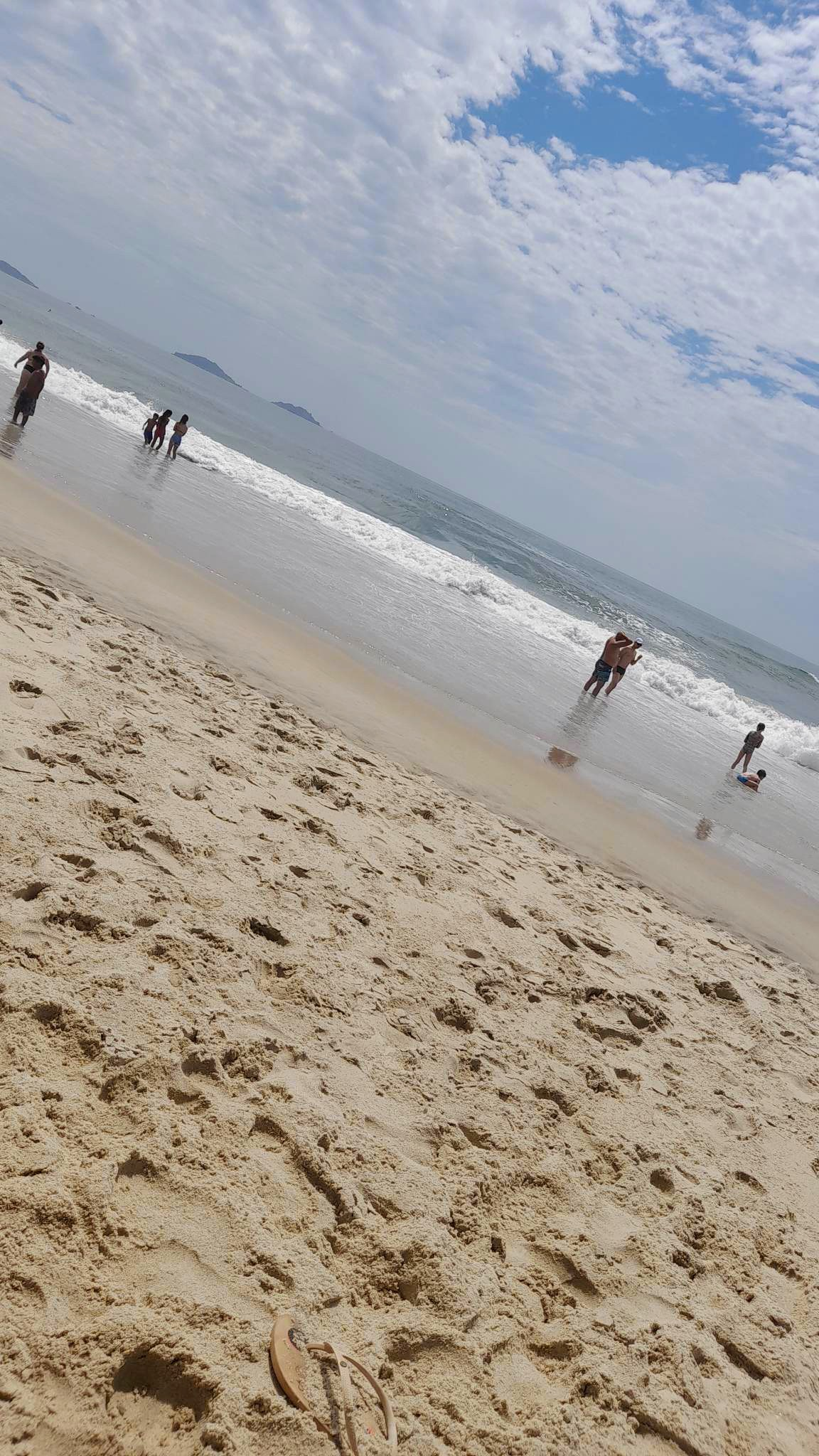

== Geography ==
Praia do Ervino is located in the northeastern part of the municipality of São Francisco do Sul, about 30 kilometers (19 miles) from the city center. It is situated between the beaches of Enseada and Praia Grande, and is bordered by the Atlantic Ocean. The beach has a total length of approximately 7 kilometers (3.4 miles), and a width that varies depending on the tide. (Note: Multiple sources:)

== Tourism ==
Praia do Ervino is a popular tourist destination, especially during the summer months when the weather is warmer. The beach is known for its calm waters, which are popular among families with children.

== Infrastructure ==
Praia do Ervino has moderate infrastructure to support tourism, including restaurants, bars, and kiosks. The beach also has a camping area for visitors who want to spend the night. In addition, there are several hotels and vacation rentals in the surrounding area.

== Environment ==
Praia do Ervino is located in an area designated for environmental preservation, and visitors are asked to pay respect to the environment. The beach has a blue flag certification, which indicates that it meets international standards for water quality, safety, and environmental management.

== History and etymology ==
The name Ervino comes from a small stream that flows into the sea near the beach. The area was originally inhabited by indigenous peoples, and later became part of Brazilian territory under Portuguese colonization. In the 19th century, the region saw a boom in the production and export of rice. In modern times, tourism has become a larger part of the local economy.

== Access ==
Praia do Ervino is accessible by car via the BR-101 highway, which runs through the state of Santa Catarina. The beach is also served by public transportation, with buses running from São Francisco do Sul to Praia do Ervino.

== In popular culture ==
Praia do Ervino has been featured in several films and television shows, including the Brazilian telenovela Malhação. The beach is also a popular location for photo and video shoots.

== See also ==
- List of beaches in Brazil
- List of beaches
- List of beaches in Pernambuco, a state of Brazil
- List of beaches in Rio Grande do Norte, a state of Brazil
