= List of beaches in Pernambuco =

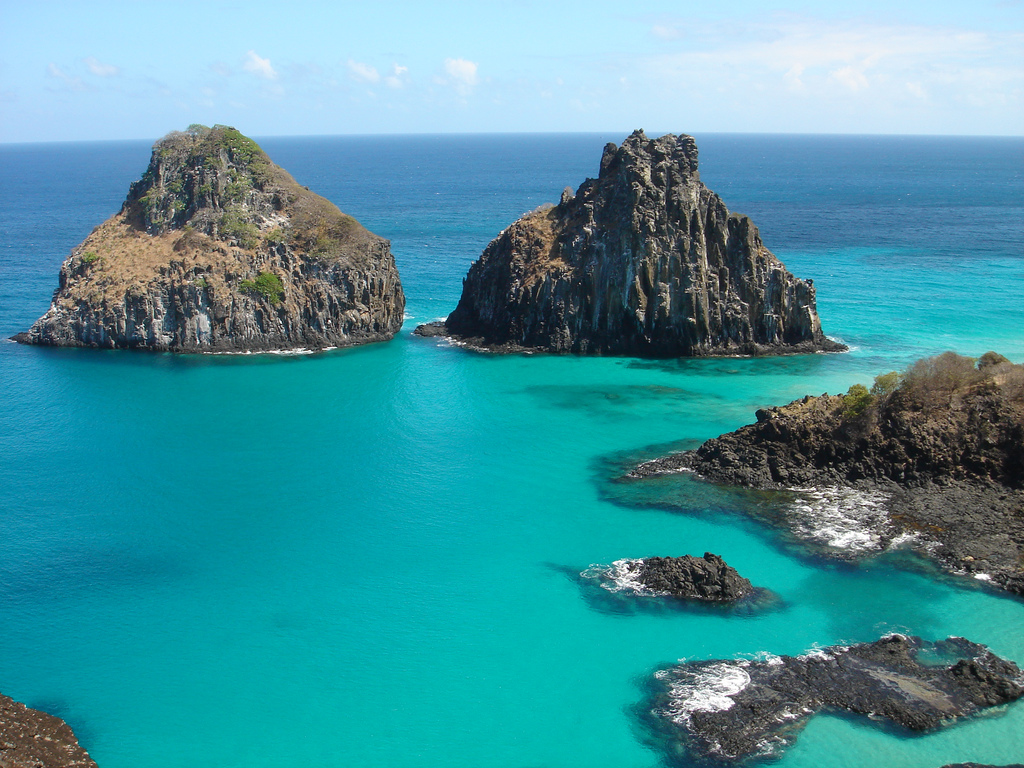
Two brothers Rocks in Fernando de Noronha.

Below is a list of beaches in the Brazilian state of Pernambuco by municipality, from the northernmost Carne de Vaca beach until Coroa Grande at the south end.

The Pernambuco coast has 187 kilometres (116 mi) long plus the Fernando de Noronha islands coast. In Pernambuco are located dozens of beaches of all types, from virgin to urban ones.

== Goiana ==
- Carne de Vaca
- Pontas de Pedras
- Barra de Catuama
- Catuama
- Atapuz
- Tabatinga

== Itamaracá Islands ==
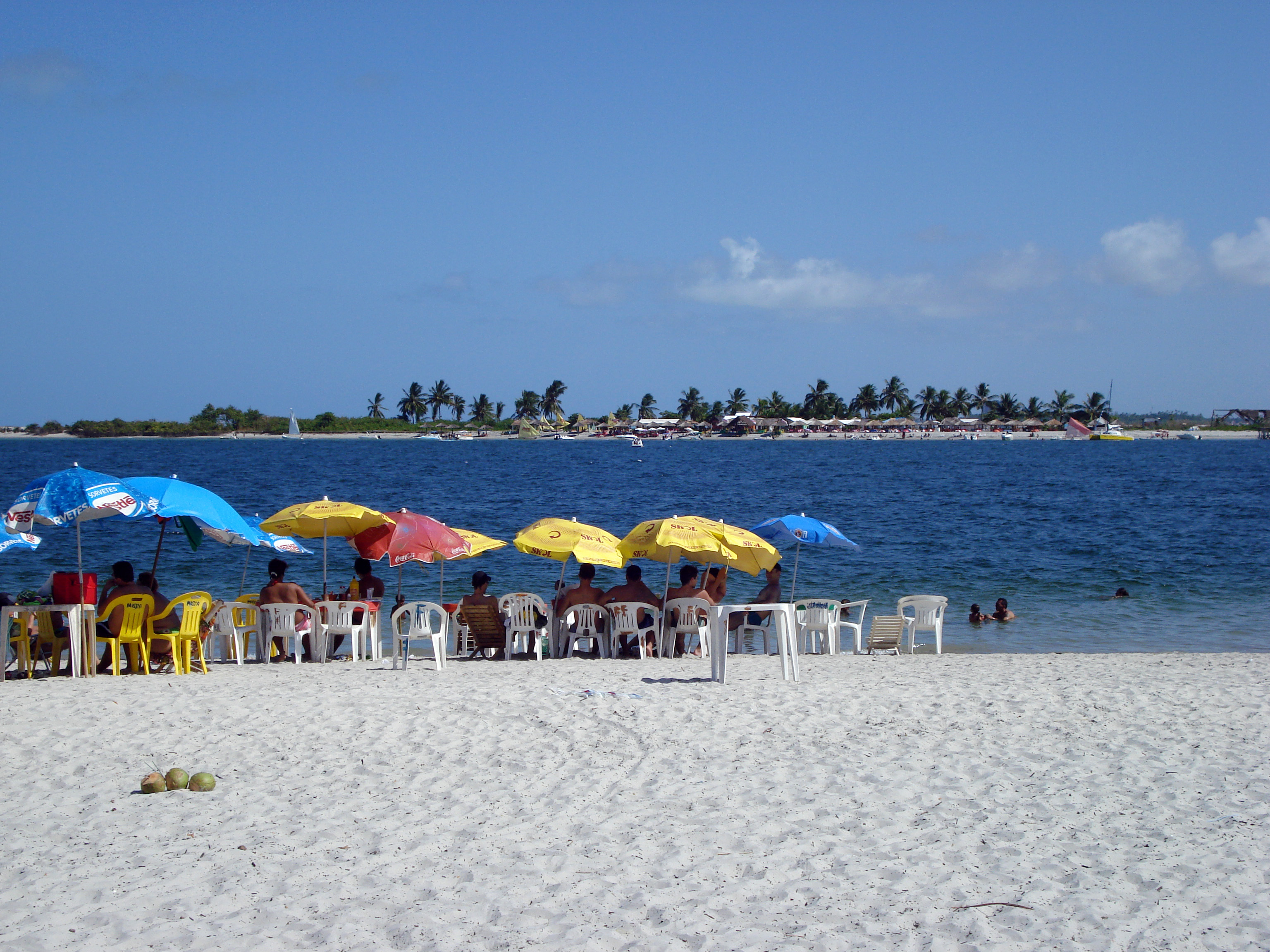
Ilha de Itamaracá Beach

- Pontal da Ilha
- Fortinho
- Pontal de Jaguaribe
- Jaguaribe

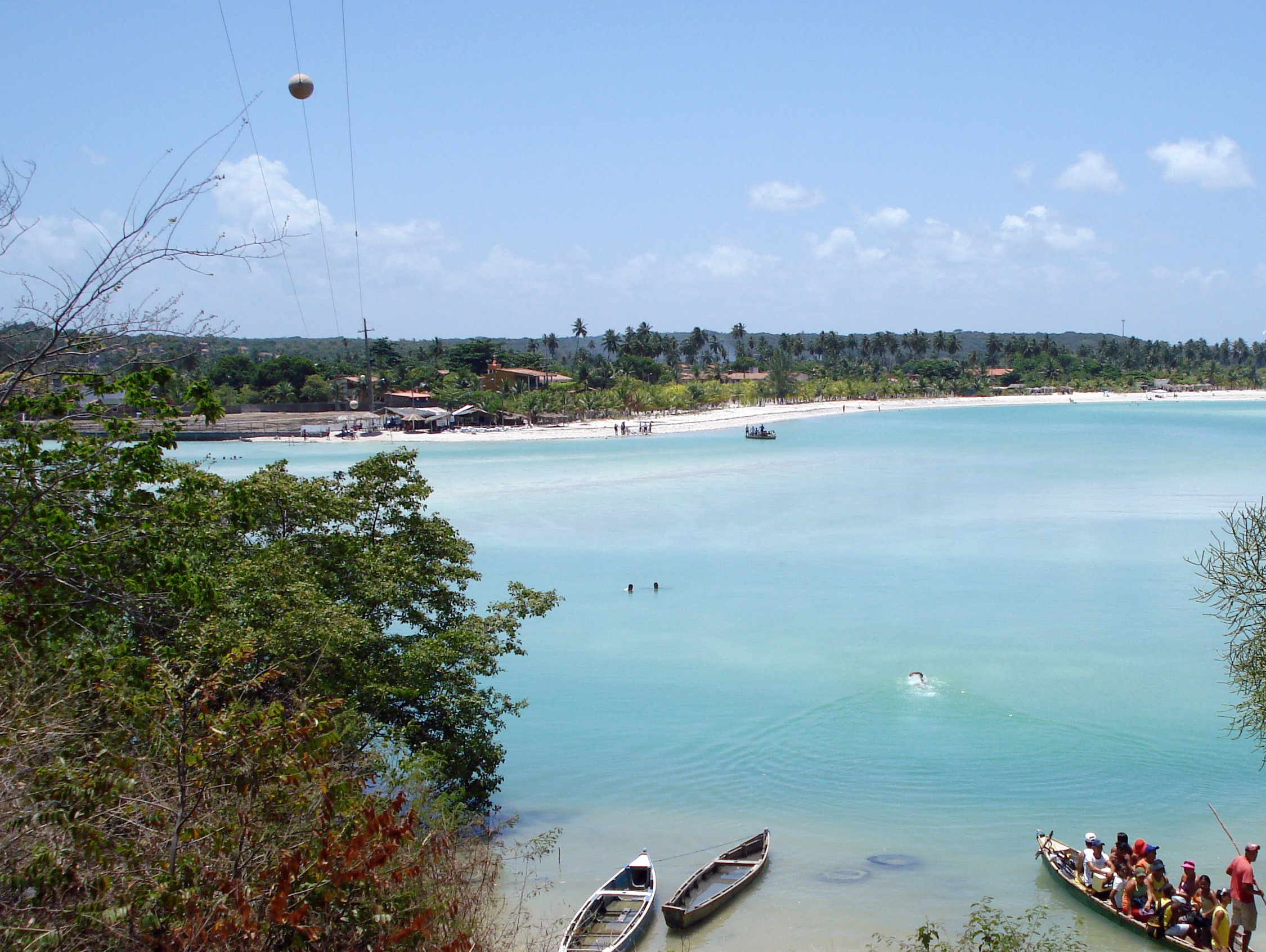
Ilha de Itamaracá estuary

- Quatro cantos
- Pilar
- Rio Âmbar
- Baixa Verde
- Forno de Cal
- Forte Orange
- Enseada dos Golfinhos

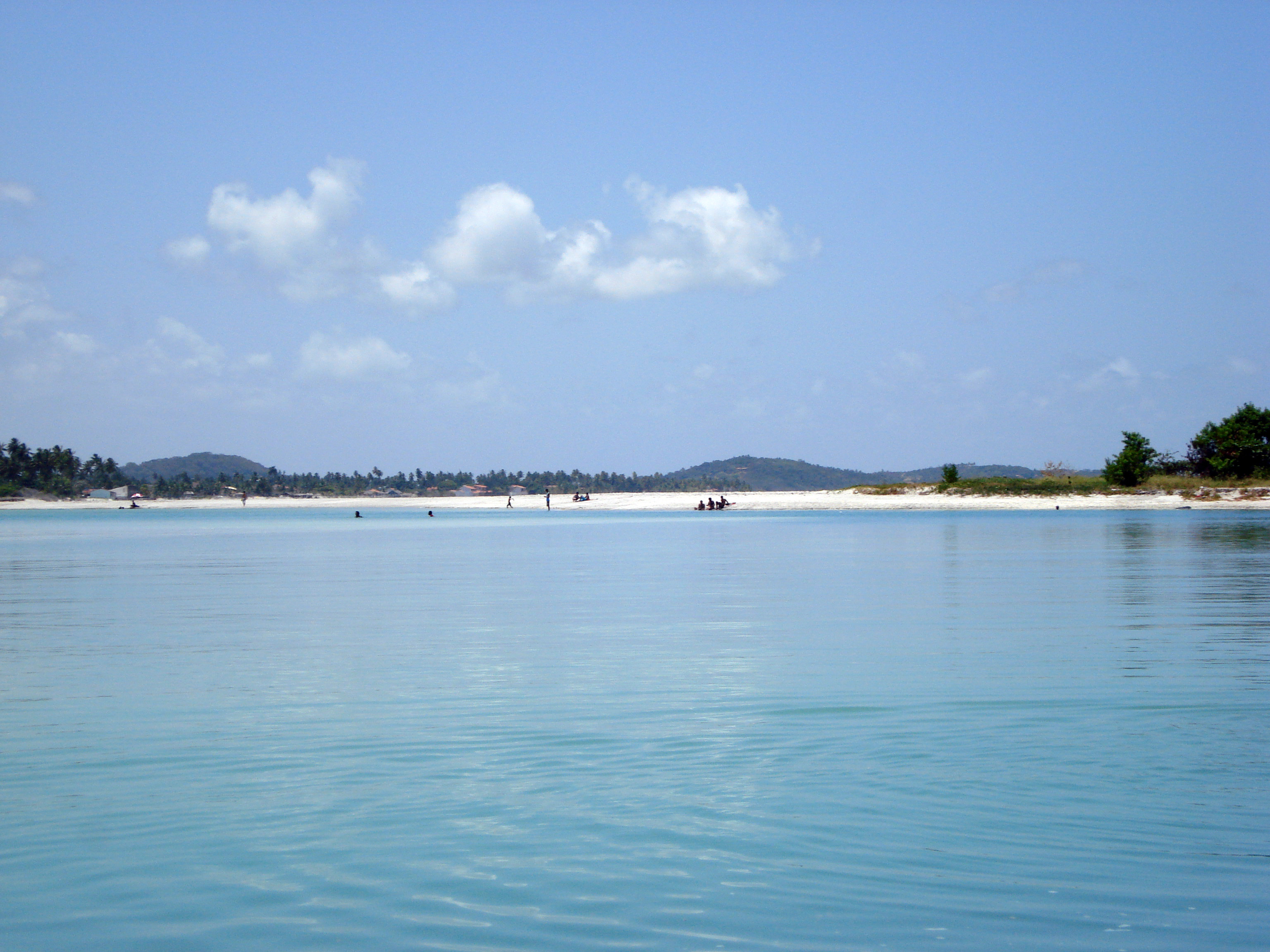
Estuary

- São Paulo
- Sossego

== Igarassu ==
- Gavoa
- Coroa do Avião Islet
- Mangue seco

== Paulista ==
- Conceição
- Pau Amarelo
- Janga
- Maria Farinha

== Olinda ==
- Rio Doce
- Casa Caiada
- Bairro Novo
- Farol
- Carmo
- Milagres
- Del Chifre

== Recife ==
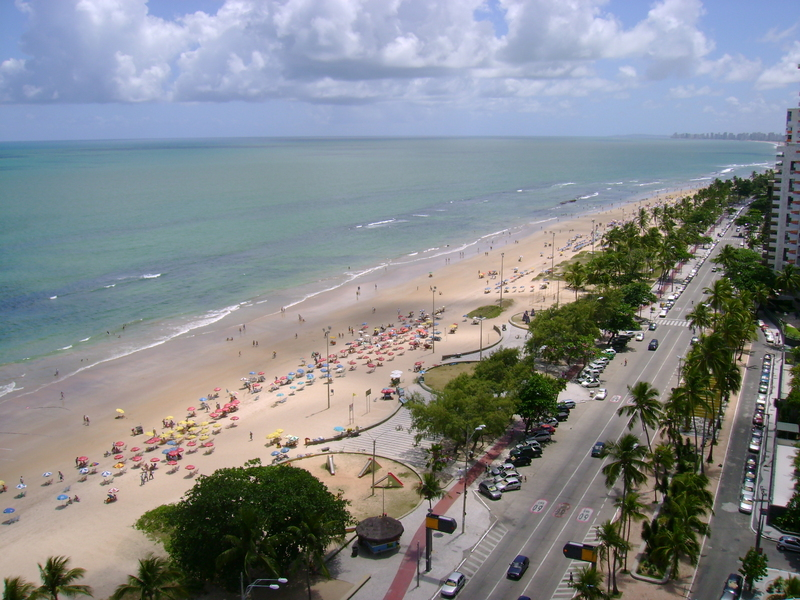
Boa Viagem seen from an apartment

- Brasília Teimosa
- Pina
- Boa Viagem, Recife

== Jaboatão ==
- Piedade
- Candeias
- Barra de Jangada

== Cabo de Santo Agostinho ==
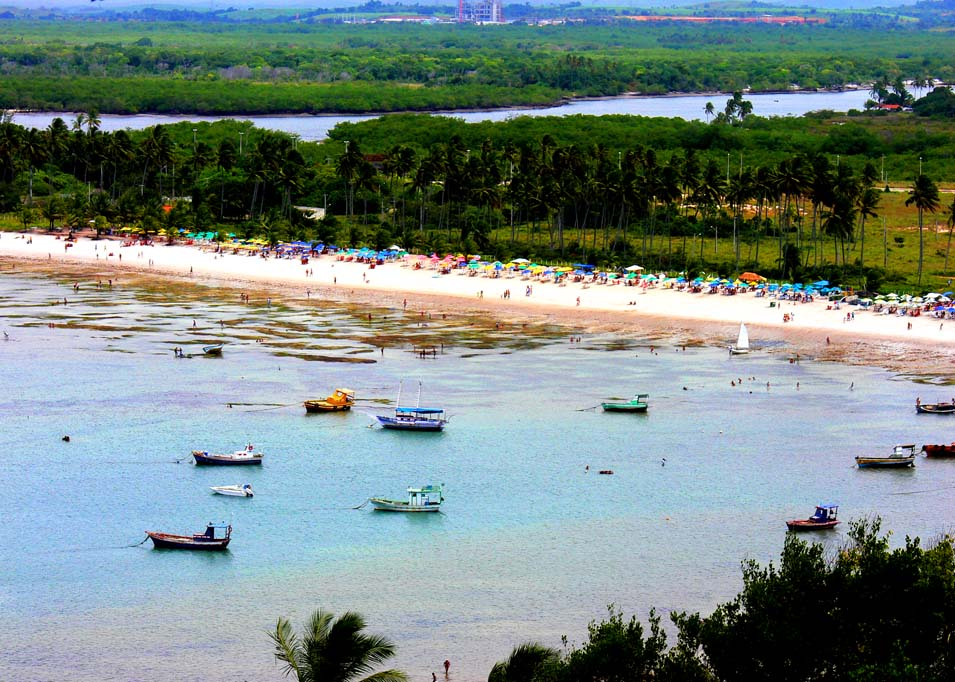
Suape beach.

- Paiva
- Itapuama
- Xeréu
- Enseada dos Corais
- Gaibu
- Calhetas
- Paraiso
- Suape

== Ipojuca ==
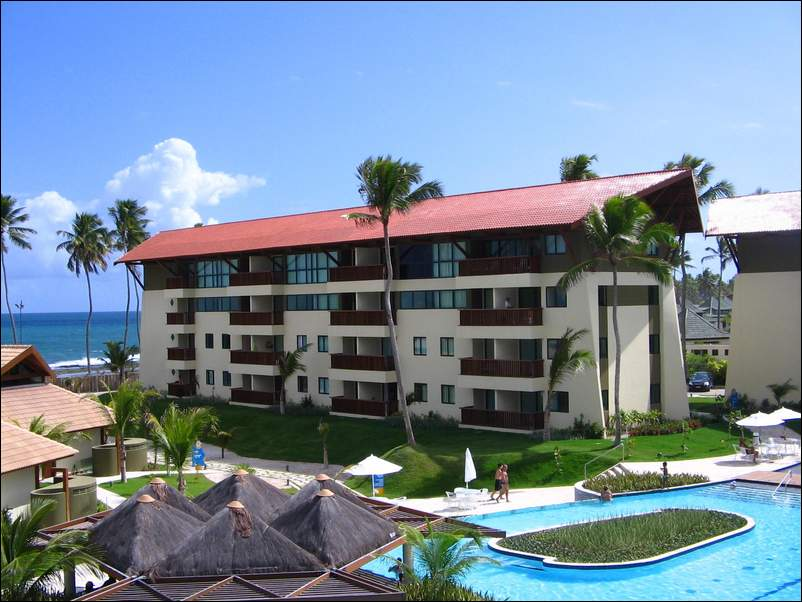
Resort in Muro Alto.

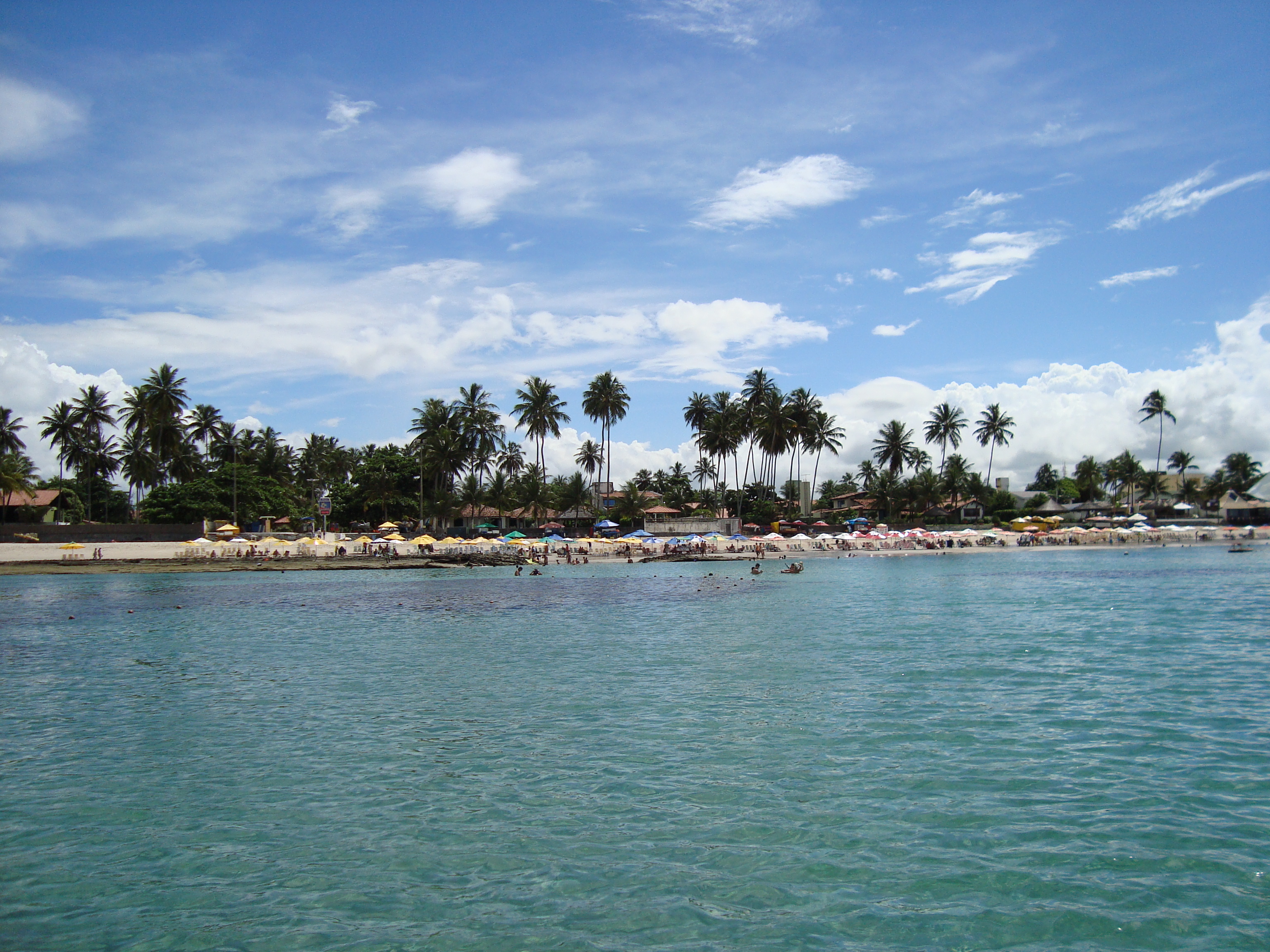
Porto de Galinhas, view from a boat.

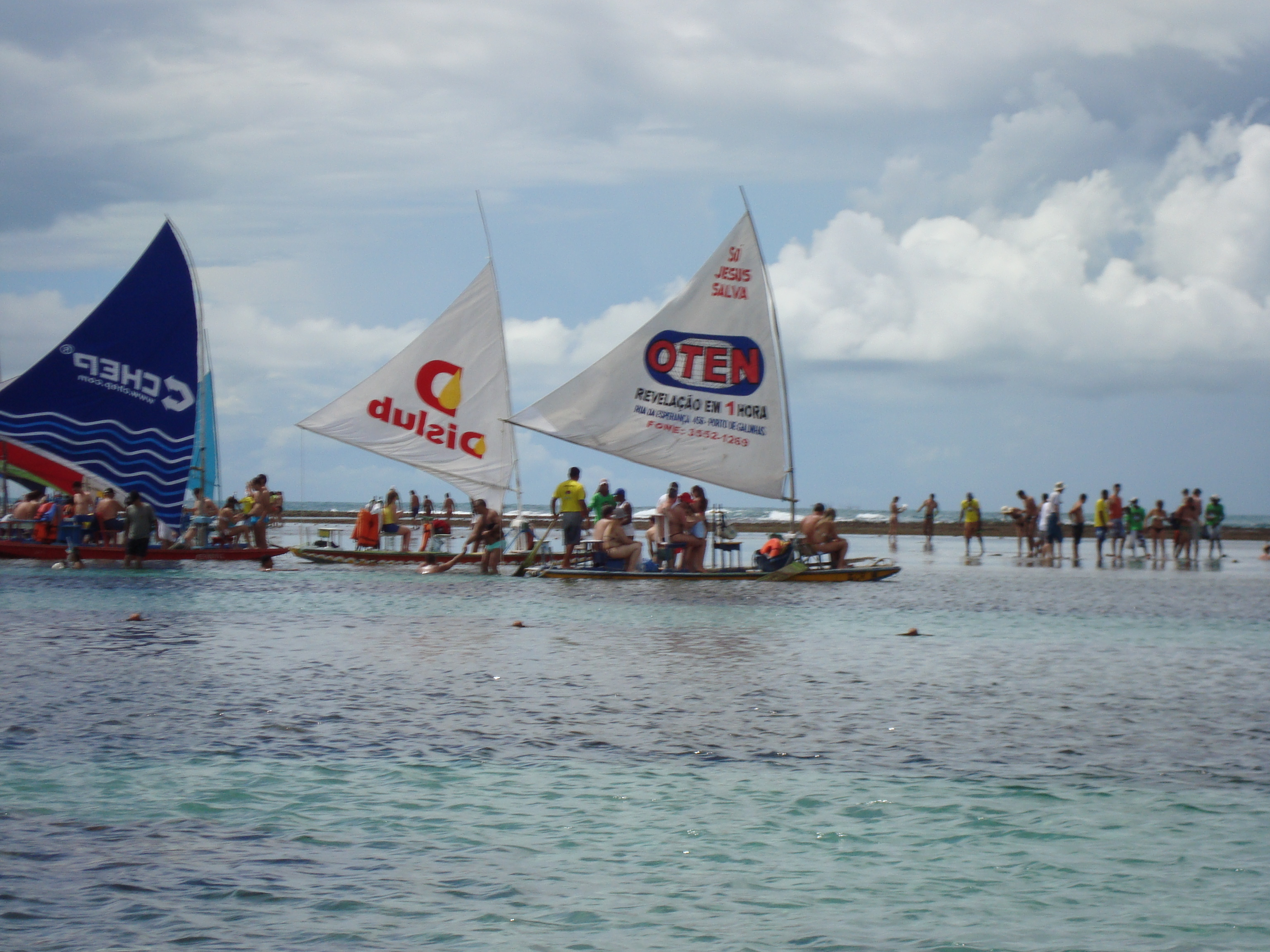
Typical raft boats in Porto.

- Camboa
- Muro Alto
- Cupé
- Porto de Galinhas
- Pontal de Maracaípe
- Maracaípe
- Serrambi

== Sirinhaém ==
- Gamela
- Guadalupe
- Barra de Sirinhaém

== Rio Formoso ==
- Pedra
- Reduto

== Tamandaré ==
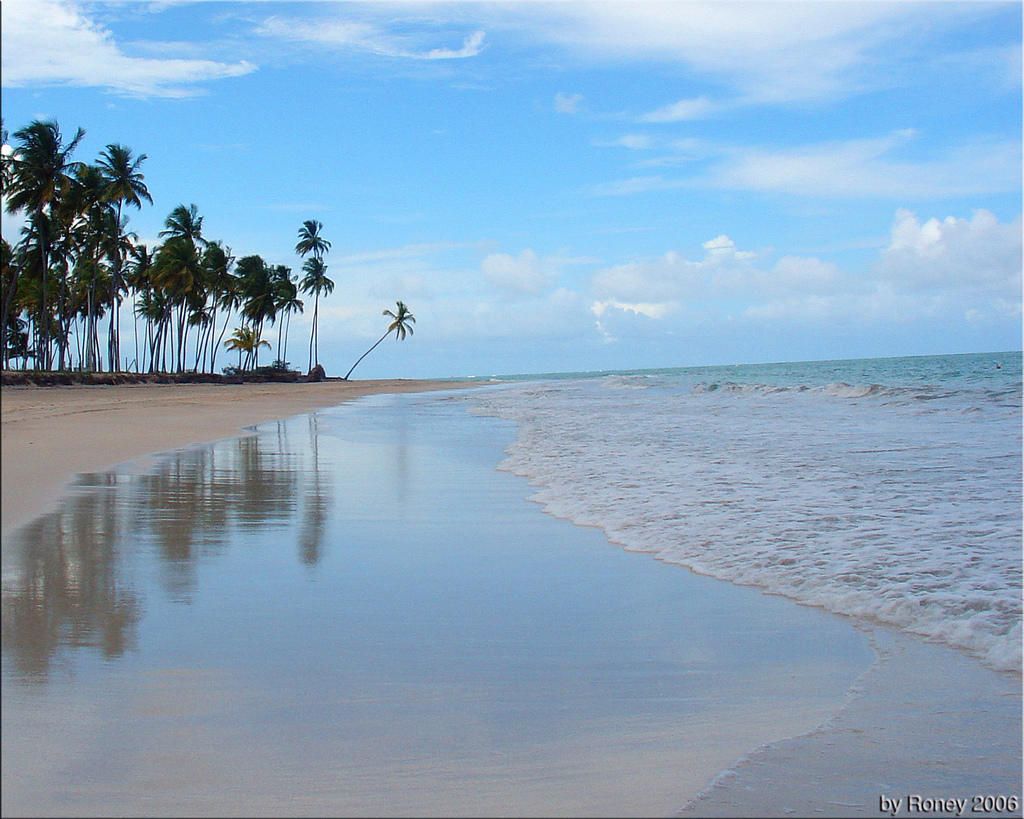
Tamandaré Beach

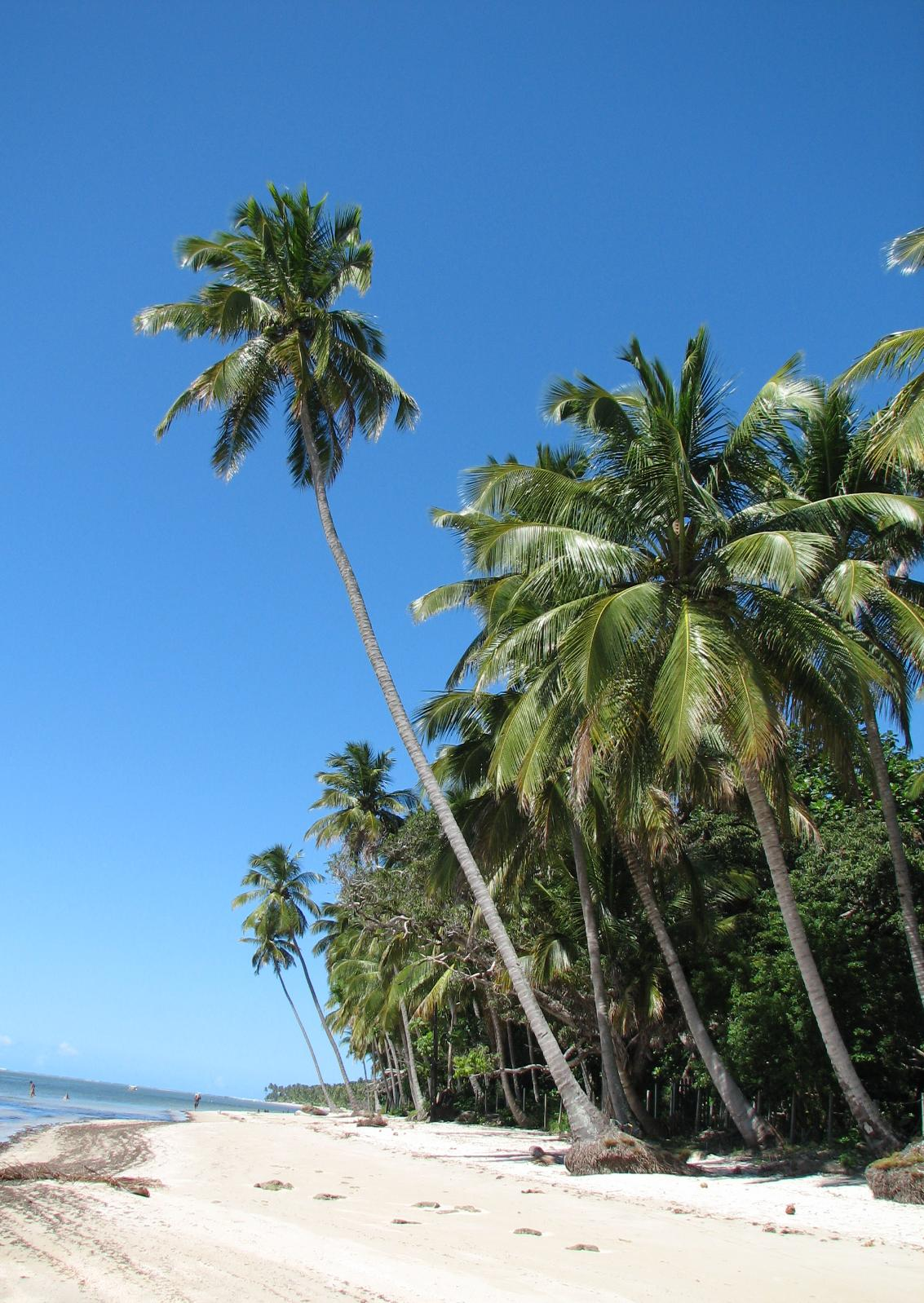
Carneiros Beach Beach

- Boca da Barra
- Campas
- Tamandaré
- Carneiros

== Barreiros ==
- Porto
- Mamucabinhas

== São José da Coroa Grande ==
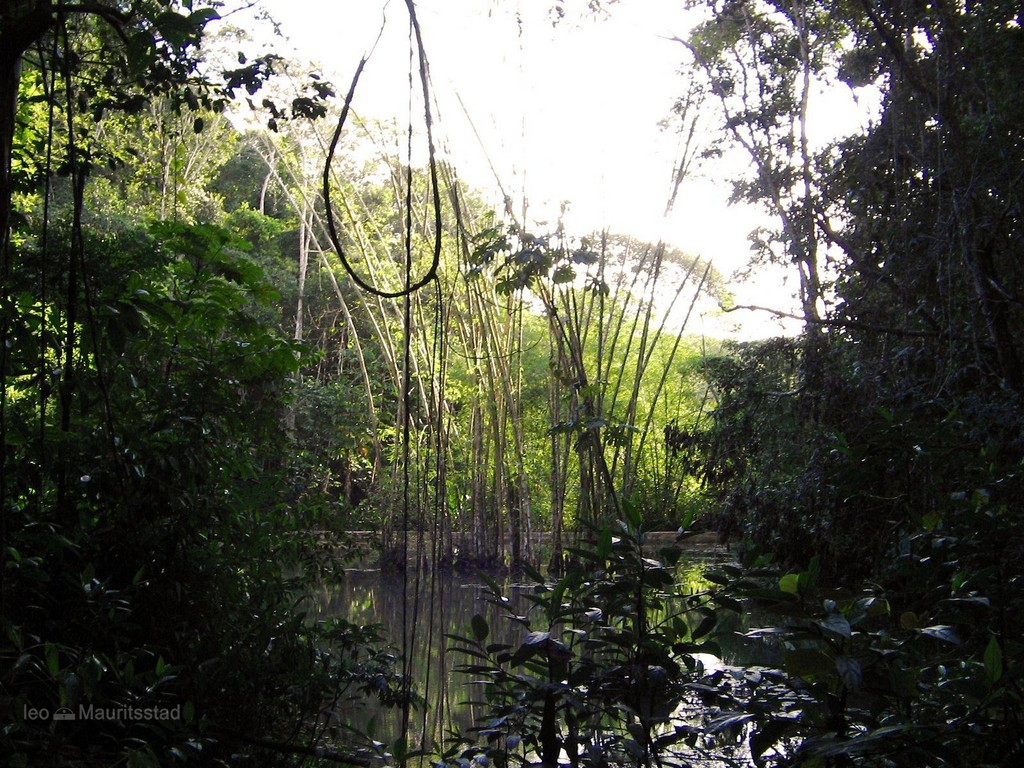
Virgin Mata Atlântica, often saw close to beaches

- Gravatá
- Barra da Cruz
- Várzea do Una
- Coroa Grande

== Fernando de Noronha Islands ==
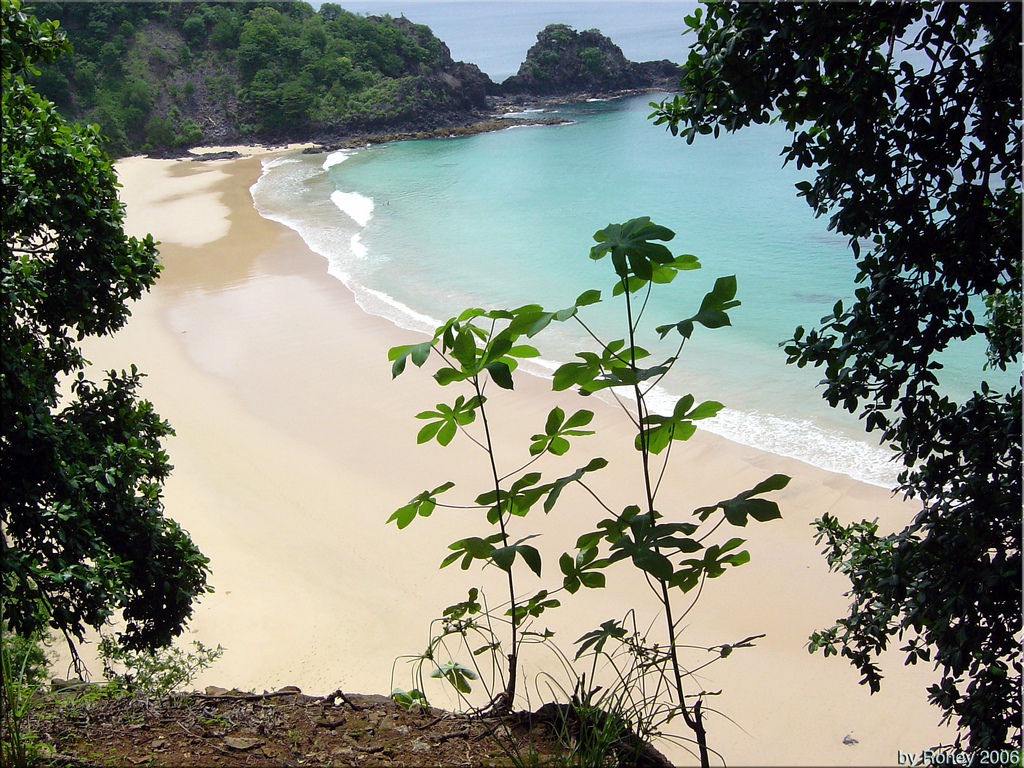
Sancho Beach - beyond is a reserve for some 600 spinner dolphins

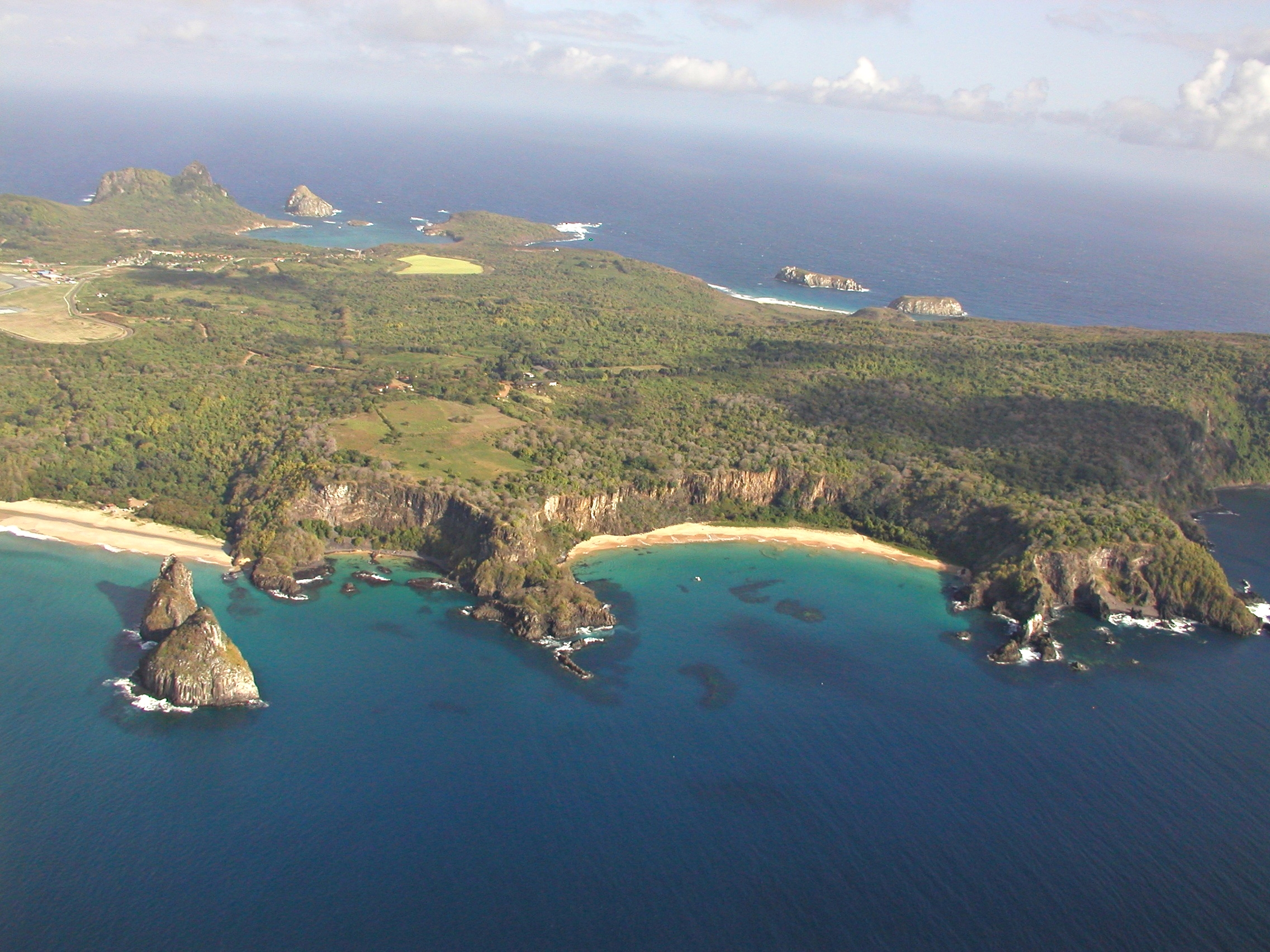
Sancho beach and two brothers rocks

- Sancho
- Conceição
- Cacimba do Padre
- Golfinhos bay
- Porcos bay
- Santo Antonio Port bay
- Boldró
- Americano
- Bode
- Biboca
- Cachorro
- Do Meio
- Quixaba
- Ponta da Sapata
- Leão
- Ponta das Caracas
- Sueste bay
- Atalaia
- Enseada da Caeira
- Buraco da Raquel
- Caeira
- Ponta da Air France

== Gallery ==
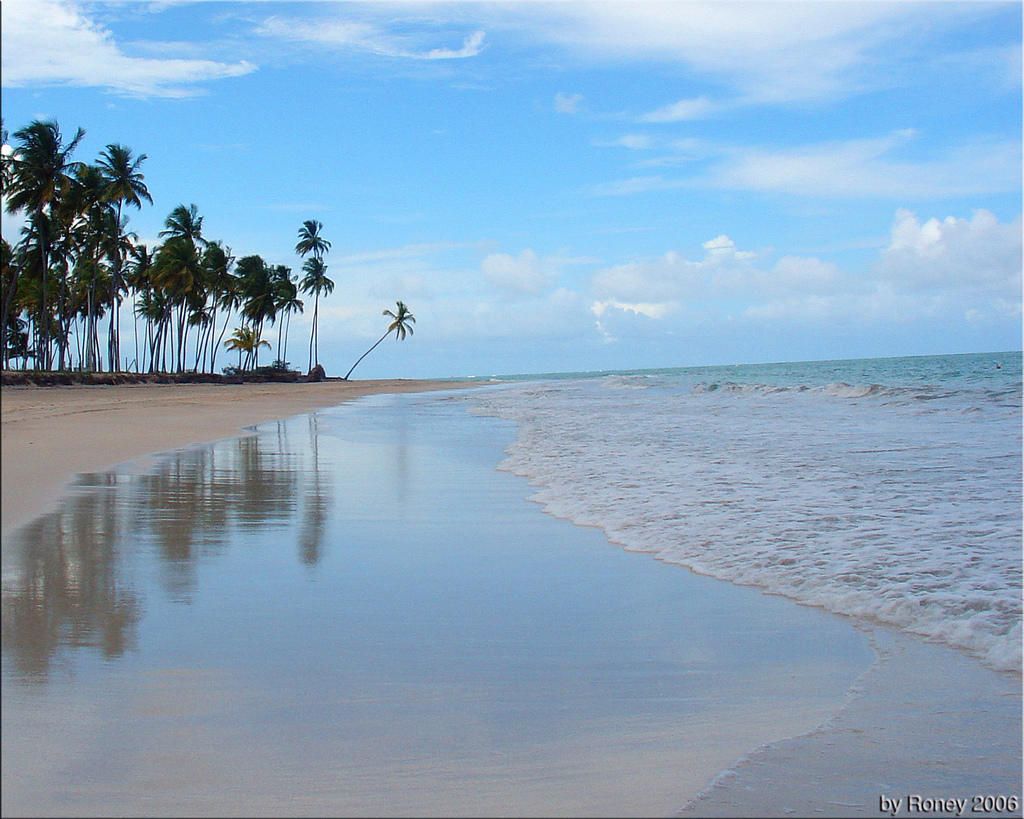
Tamandaré Beach.

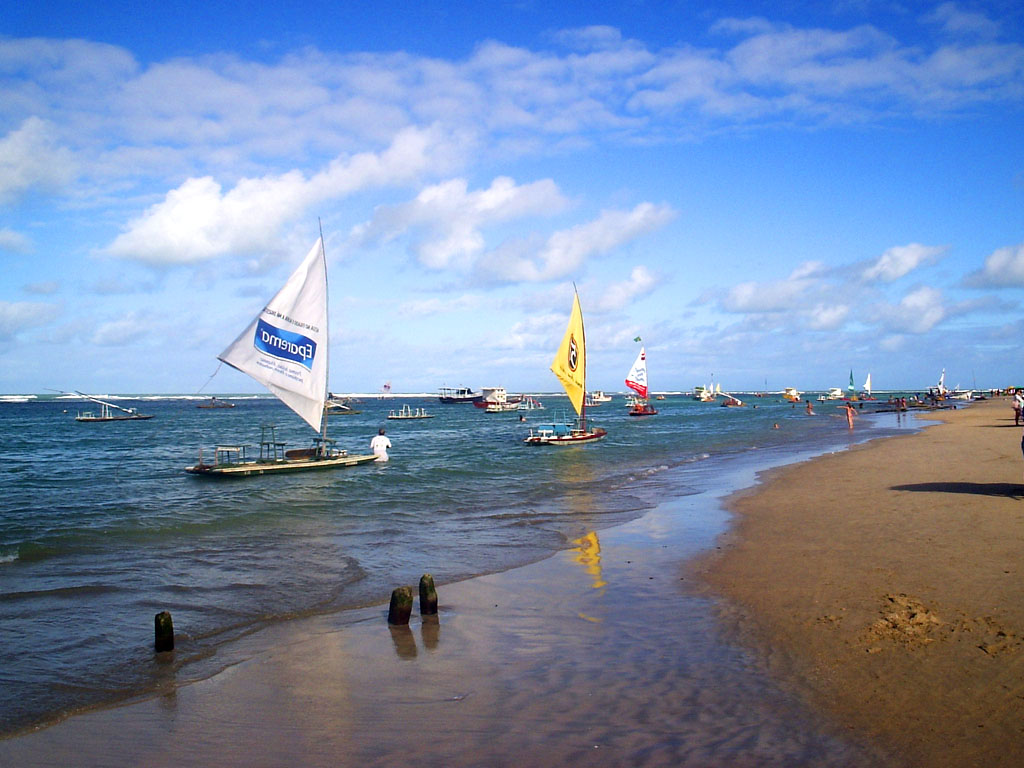
Porto de Galinhas Beach.

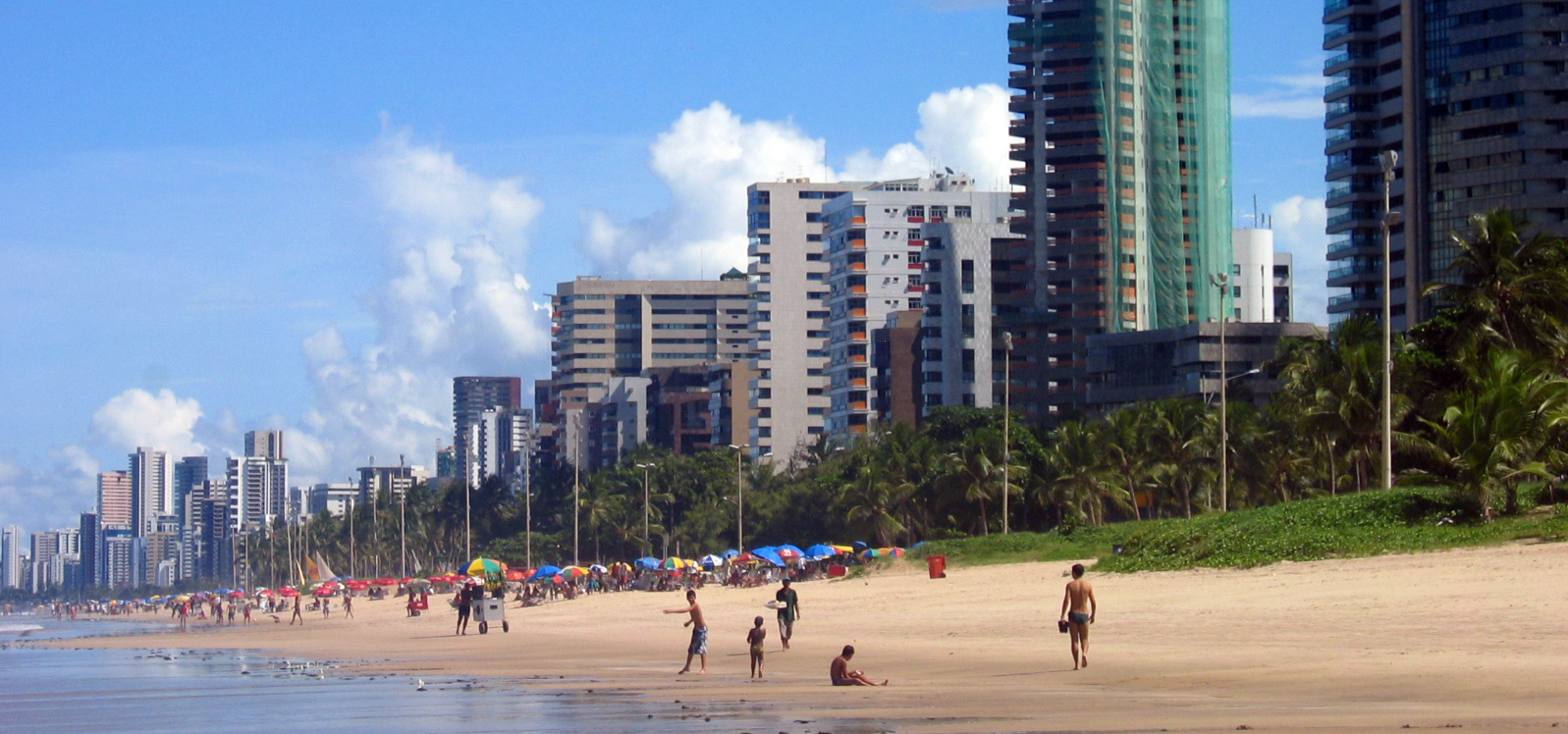
Boa Viagem seen from the beach.

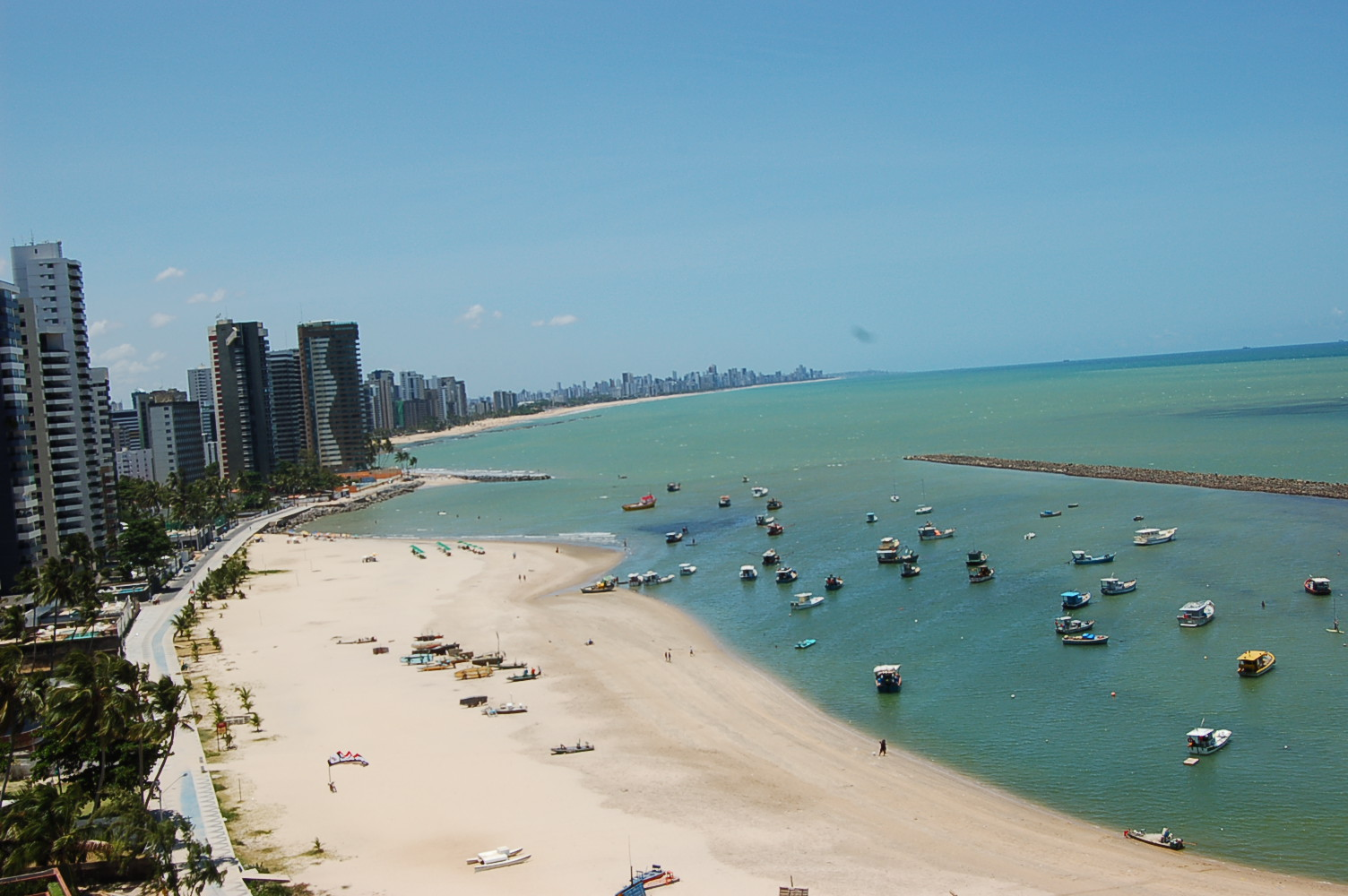
Candeias beach.

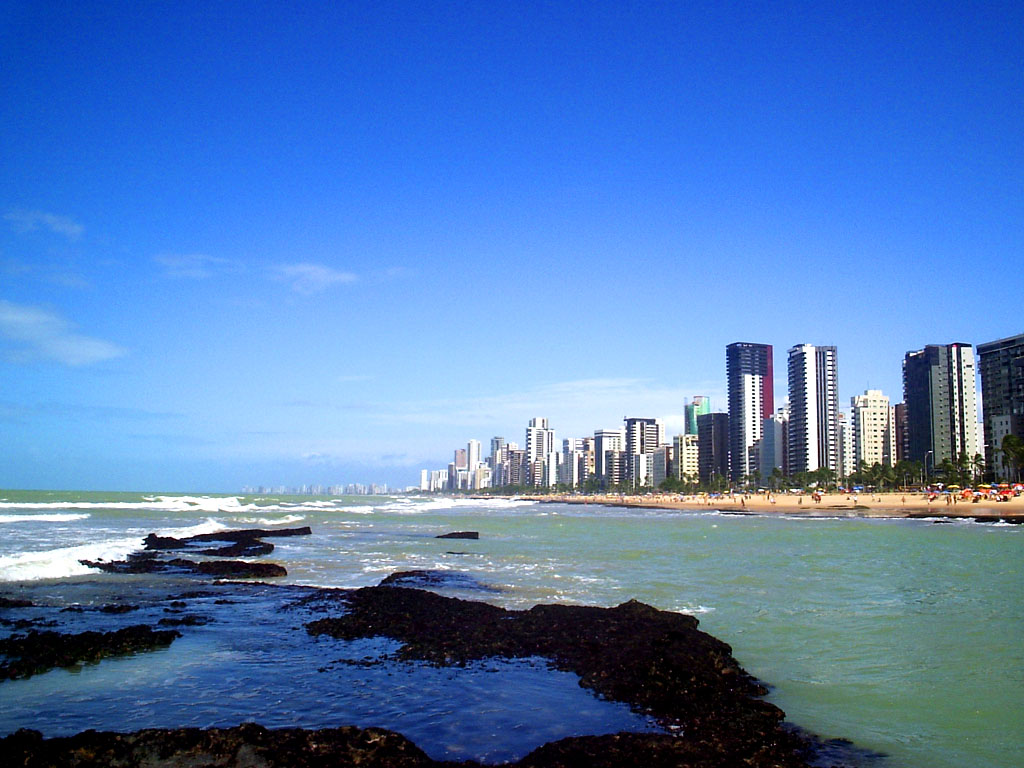
Boa Viagem view from the sea reefs.

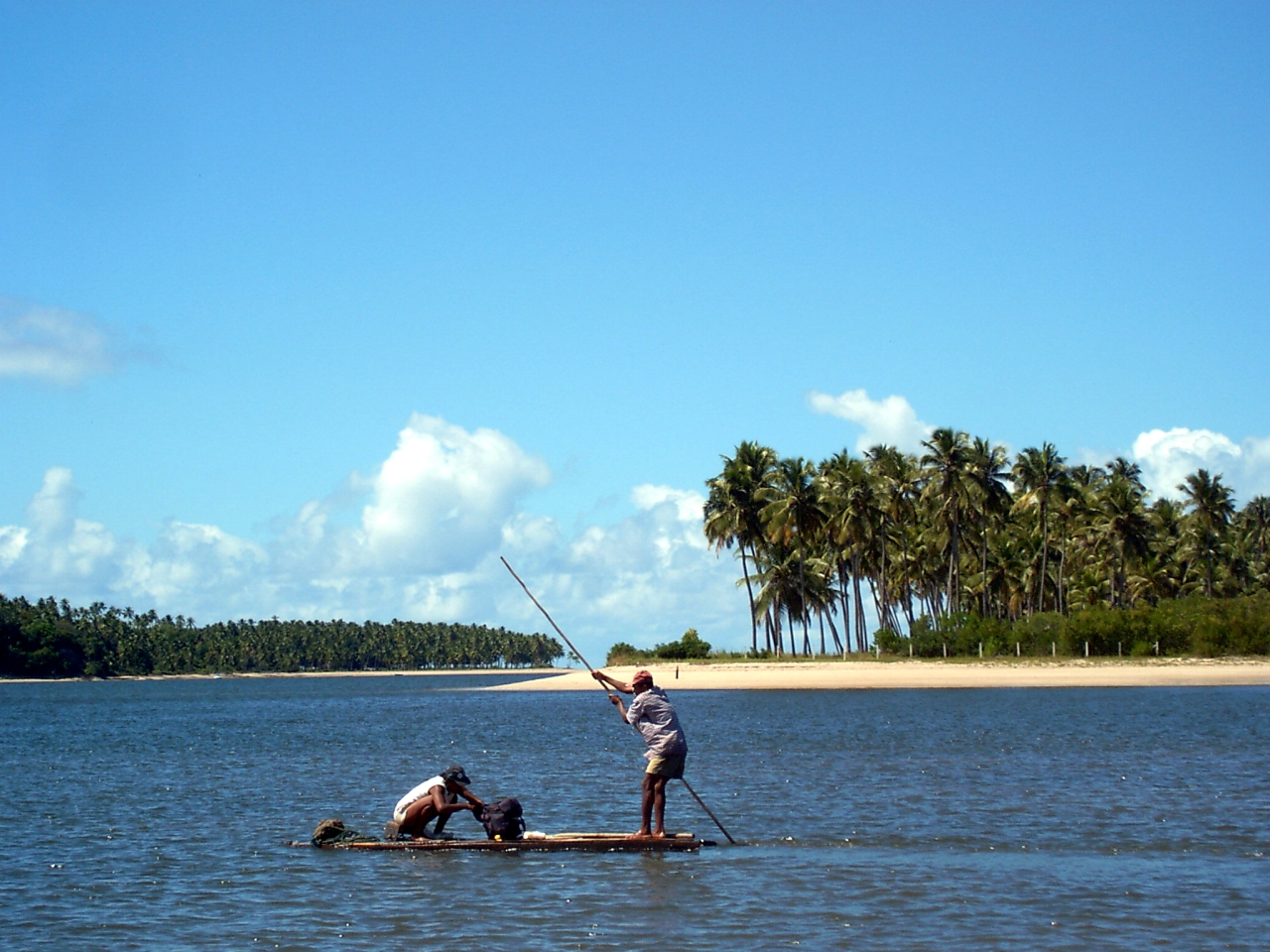
Fishermen in Tamandaré.
