= Santo Antônio de Lisboa, Santa Catarina =

Santo Antônio de Lisboa
- District
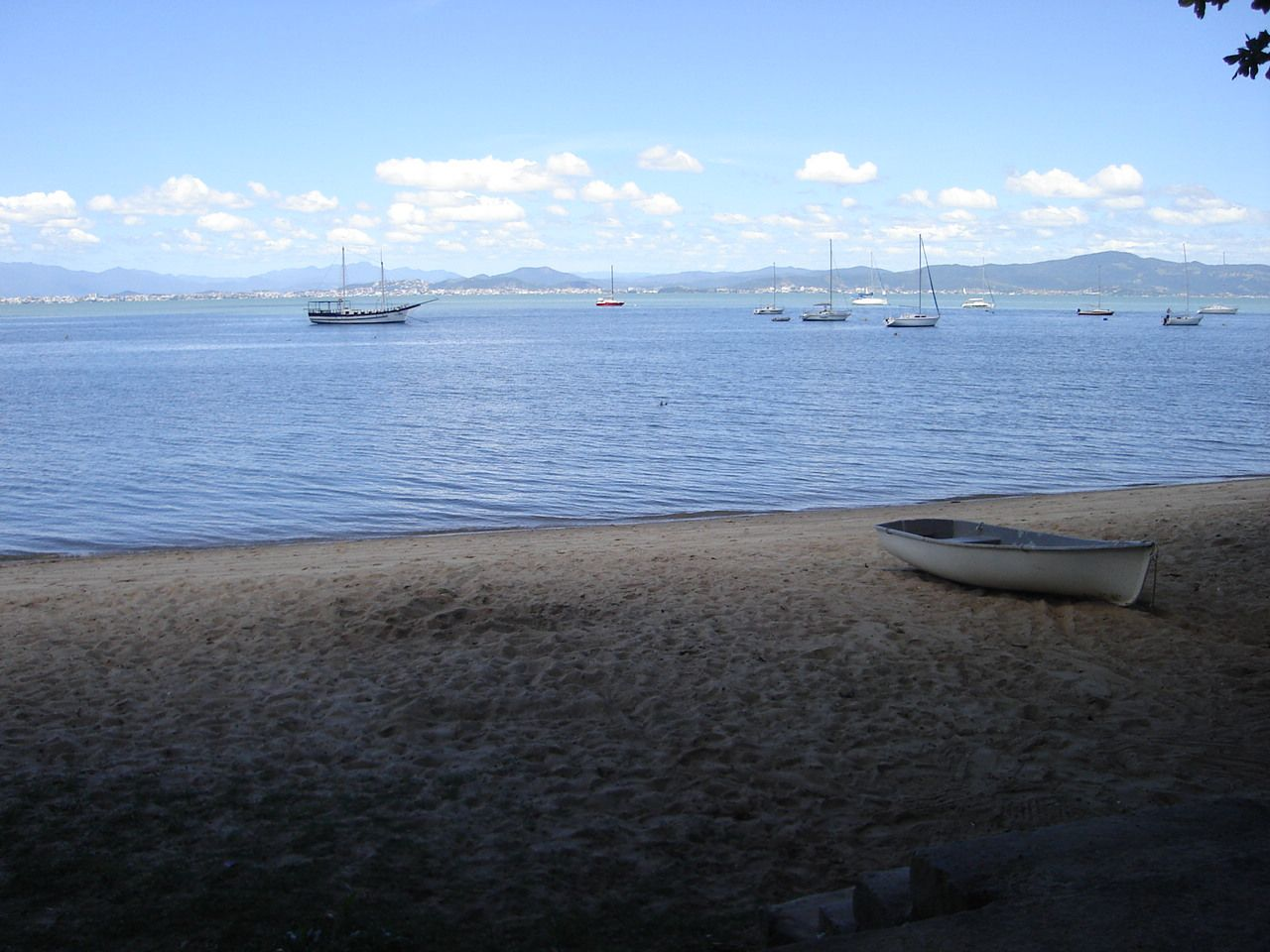

- Santo Antônio de Lisboa in Brazil
- Coordinates: 27.5069592°S 48.5196132°W
- Country: Brazil
- State: Santa Catarina
- City: Florianópolis

Population (2000)
  - Total: 5,367
- Time zone: UTC−03:00 (Brasília time)
  - Summer (DST): UTC−02:00 (Brasília summer time)

Santo Antônio de Lisboa is a district of the city of Florianópolis, the state capital of Santa Catarina in Brazil.

It is known for having strong Azorian culture due to the immigration in the 19th century.

The seat of the district is Santo Antônio de Lisboa. The neighbourhoods of the district include:

- Barra de Sambaqui
- Cacupé
- Sambaqui
