= Pipa Beach =

Beach in Tibau do Sul municipality, Brazil

Coordinates: 6.227582°S 35.047647°W

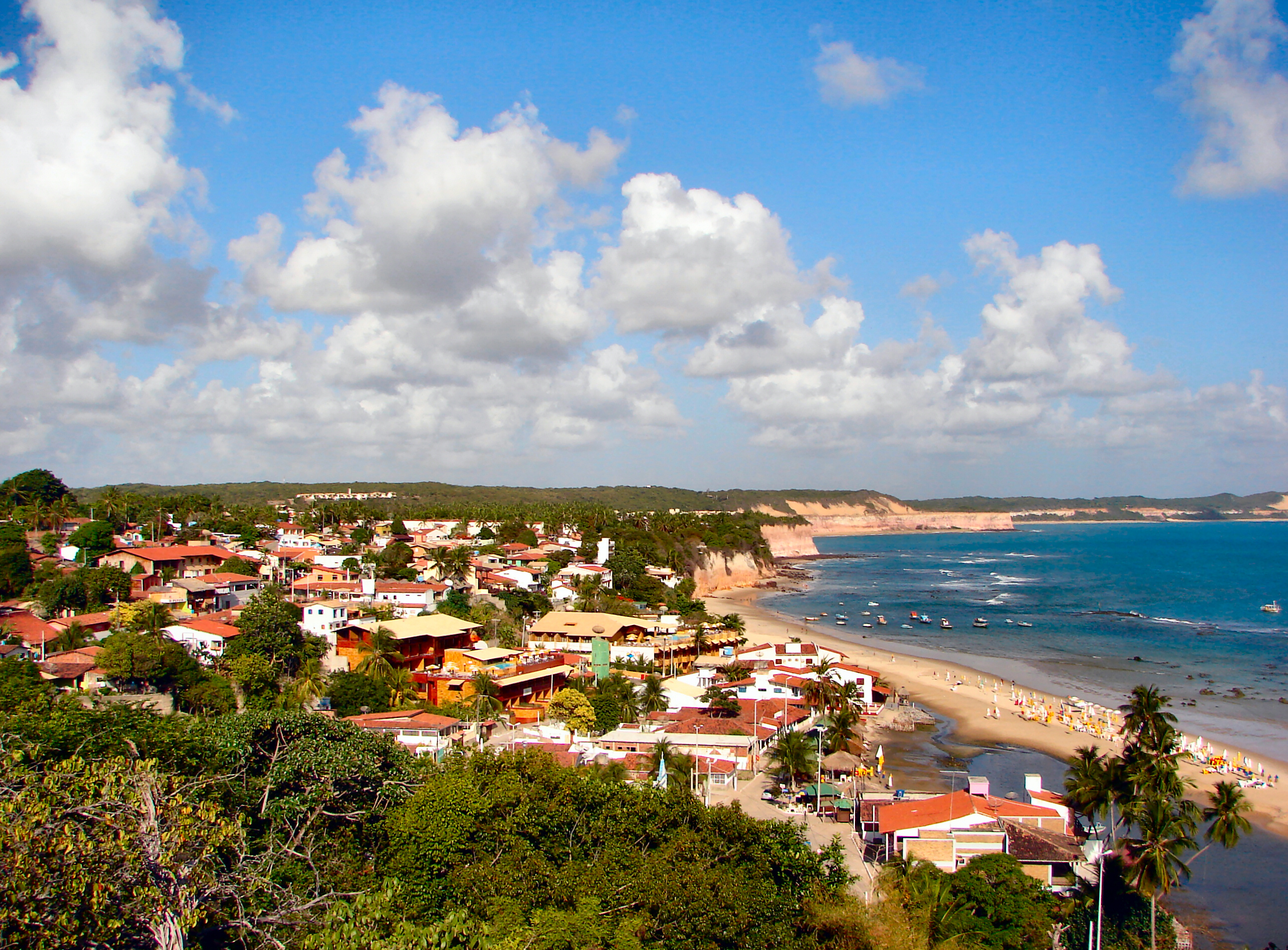
Pipa village and the town beach

Pipa Beach (Praia de Pipa in Portuguese) is a famous village in Brazil, located next to city of Natal in the state of Rio Grande do Norte.

== History ==
The first maps of the coastline drawn by Portuguese settlers, refer to Pipa Beach as Orotapiry, or "White man's village." In 1626, the beach became known as Itacoatiara, meaning "the painted cliff", later becoming Ponta do Cabo Verde ("Green Headland"), and is now Praia da Pipa, or "Pipa Beach", which means "Kite Beach" (in a literal translation). "Pipa" is the European Portuguese word for "barrel". The story behind the current name tells that when the Portuguese were sailing close to the beach, they could see a big, barrel-shaped rock and that's how the new name was adopted.

Pipa was a small fishing village until the 1970s. Then it was discovered by surfers and backpackers.

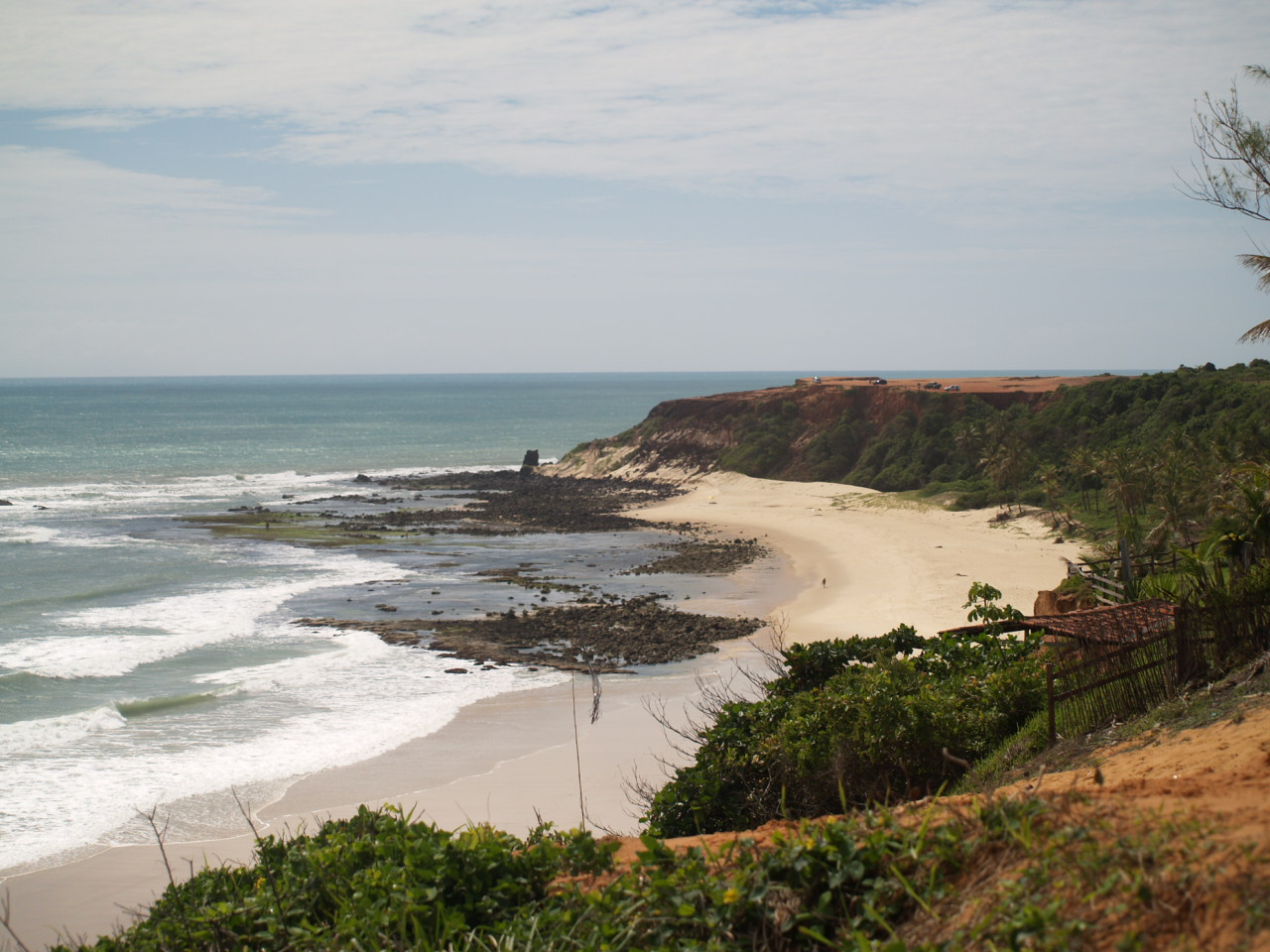
Praia Chapadão

After the Brazilians, it was the foreign visitors who discovered Pipa, which grew very fast. Soon, it became not only one of the most popular beaches in Brazil, but also one of the most cosmopolitan.

Today, many businesses in Pipa are run by foreigners who visited the town and decided to stay. Pipa, still small in area (expansion is limited by law, with the creation of Environmental Protected Areas around the village), has a high density of hotels, restaurants, bars and other tourism-oriented businesses.

Success has also brought problems to the community. The large influx of visitors and new dwellers was not matched by investments in infrastructure. Transit is slow, public sewage is not well established, prices are high and despite attempts of protection by law, the environment is threatened by the expansion. This is due to change as development laws have become even stricter due to the actions of environmentalists and various public works programs such as the construction of a ring road (on existing roads) to ease traffic congestion are going ahead.

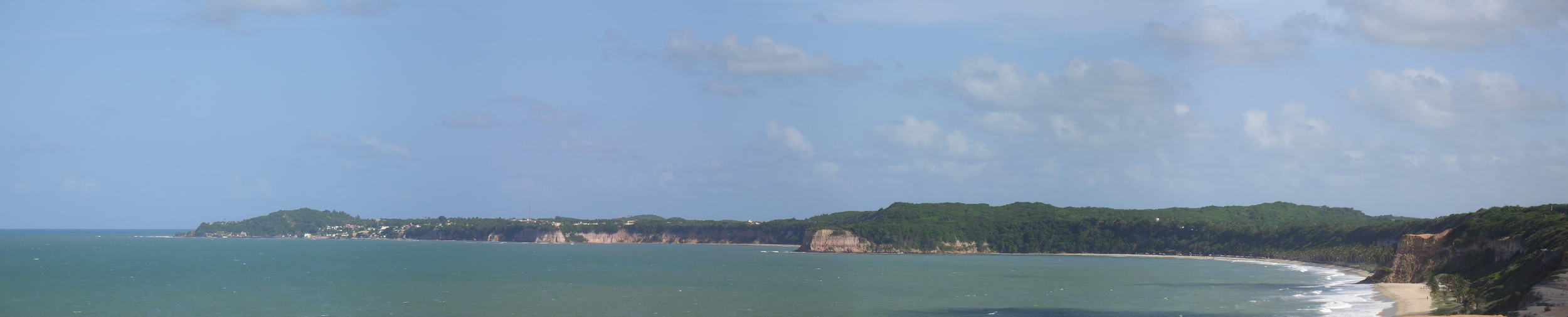
A panoramic image of Pipa Beach

== Gallery ==
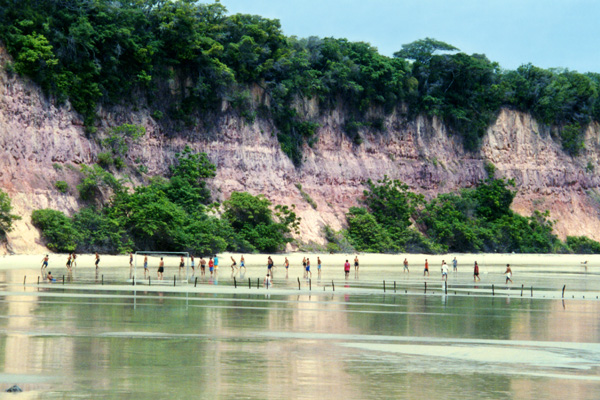
Cliff in Pipa Beach.

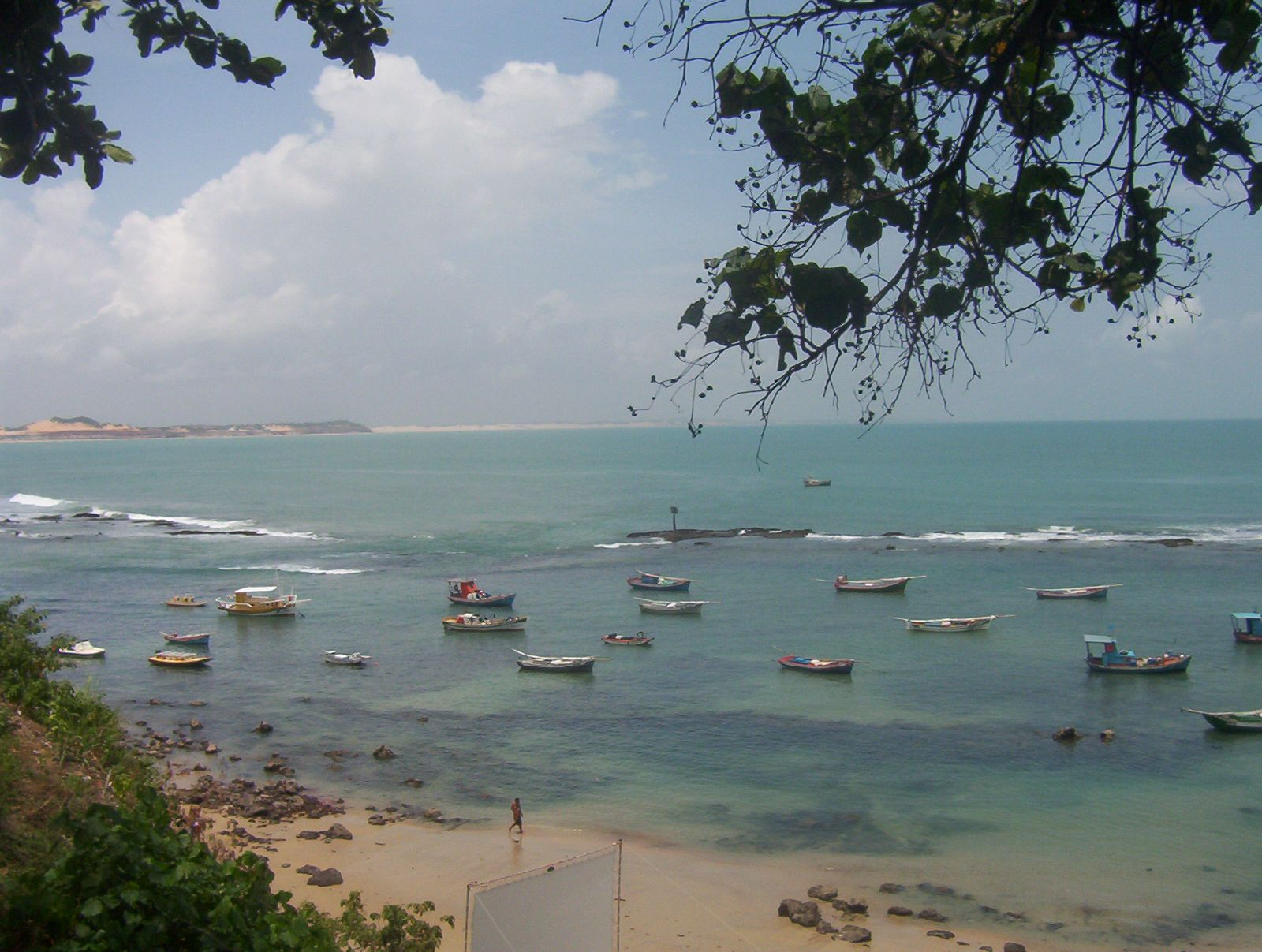
Pipa beach

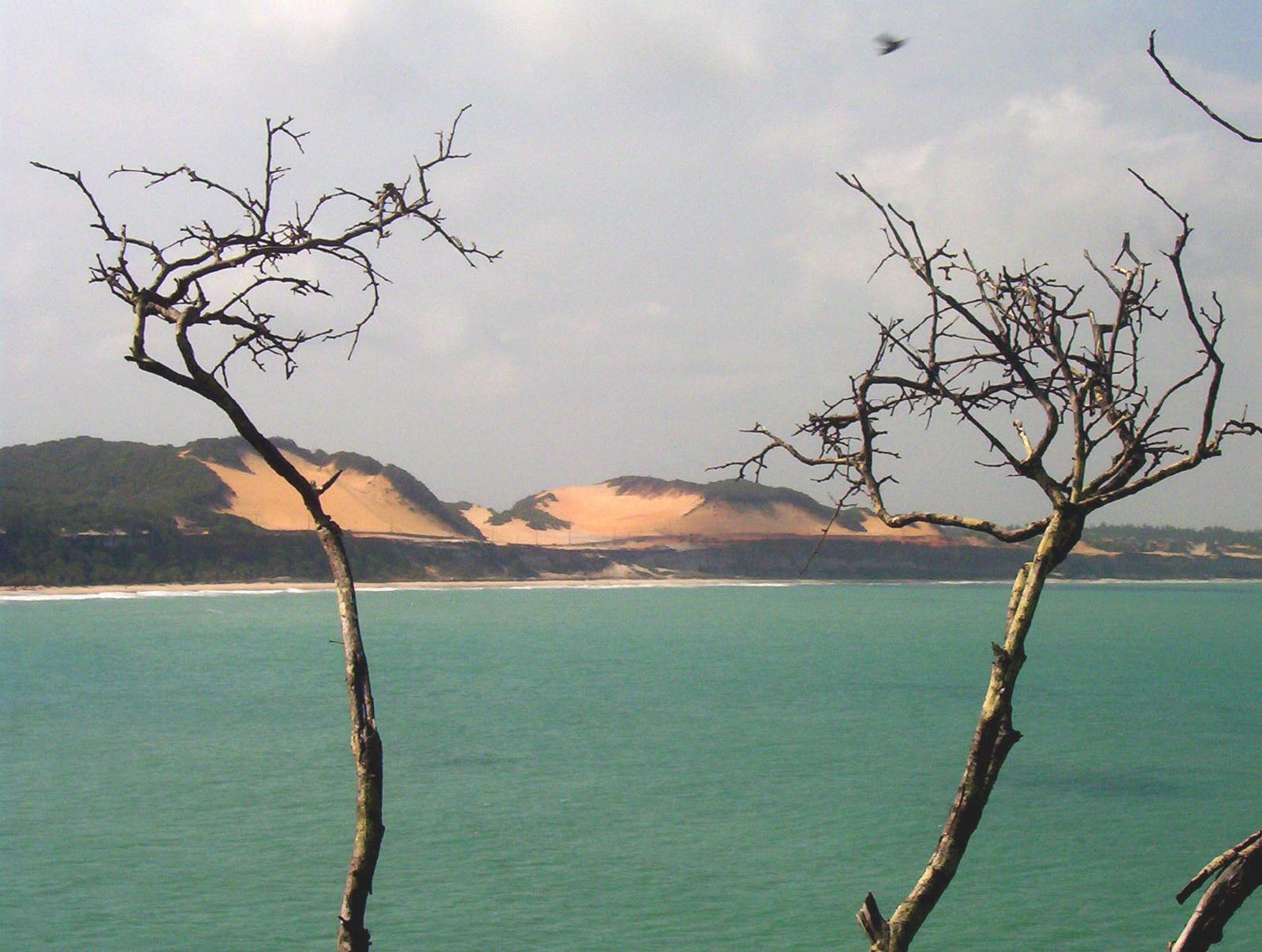
Pipa Beach.

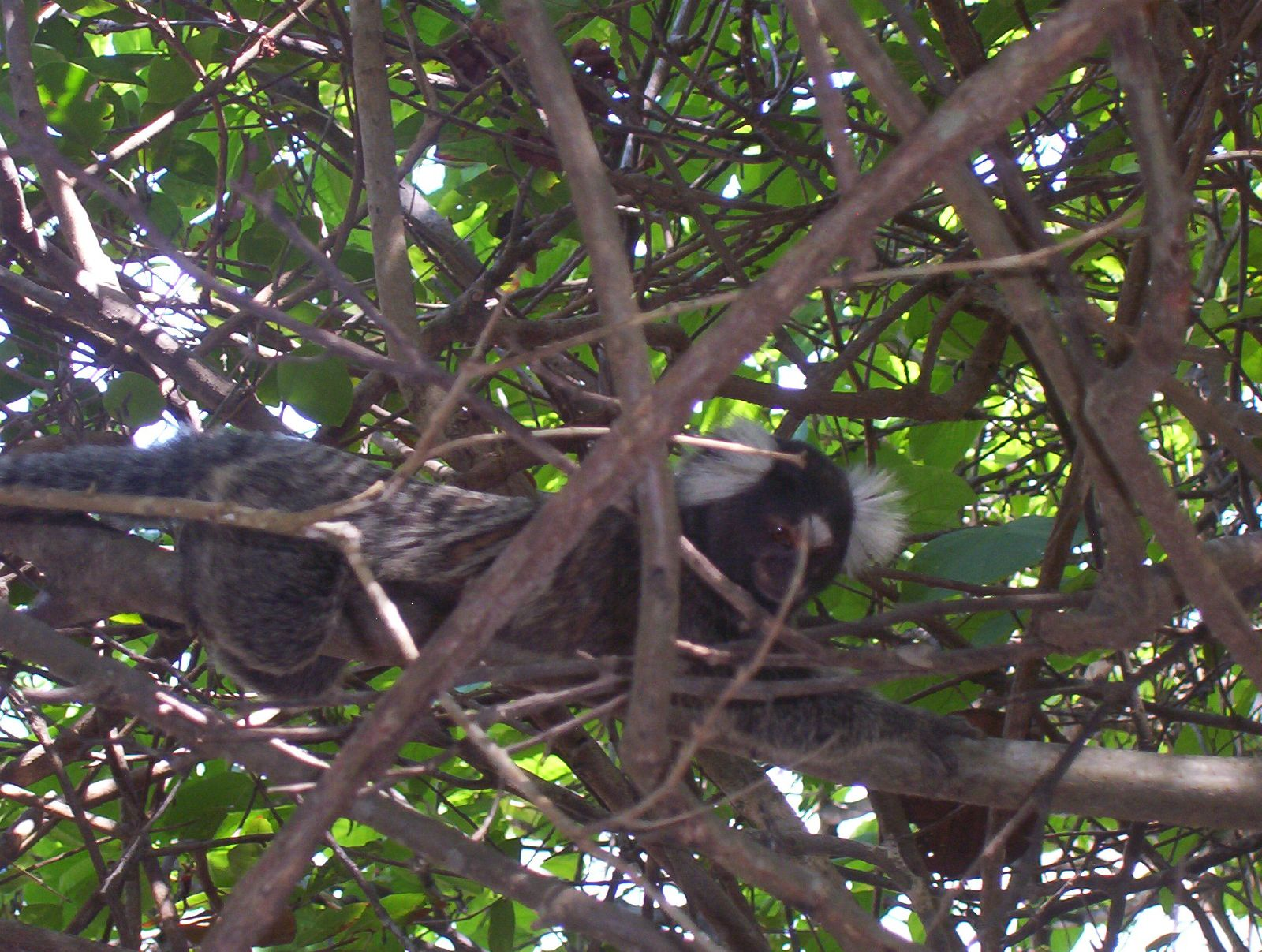
Ecological Sanctuary of Pipa.

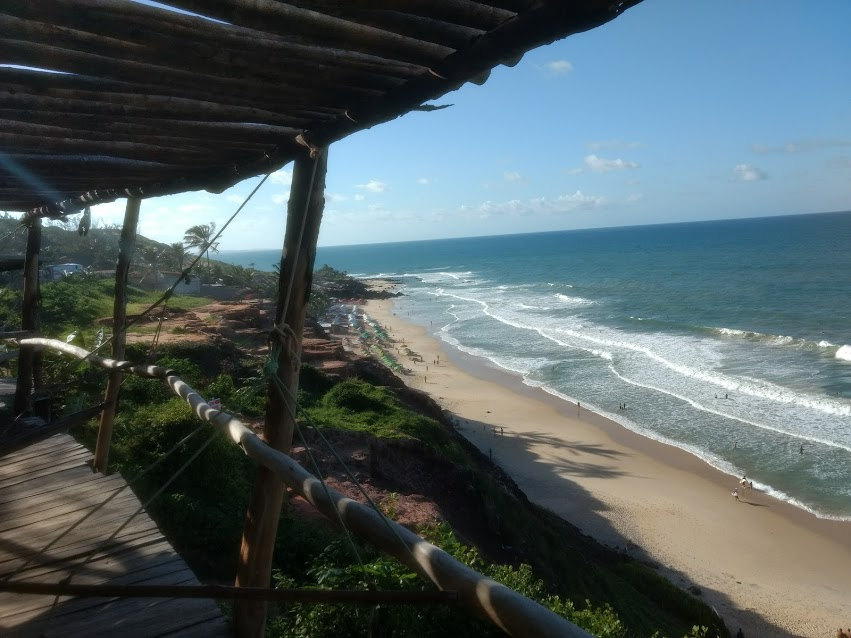
Praia do Amor.
