= Trindade, Rio de Janeiro =

Bairro in Paraty, Rio de Janeiro, Brazil

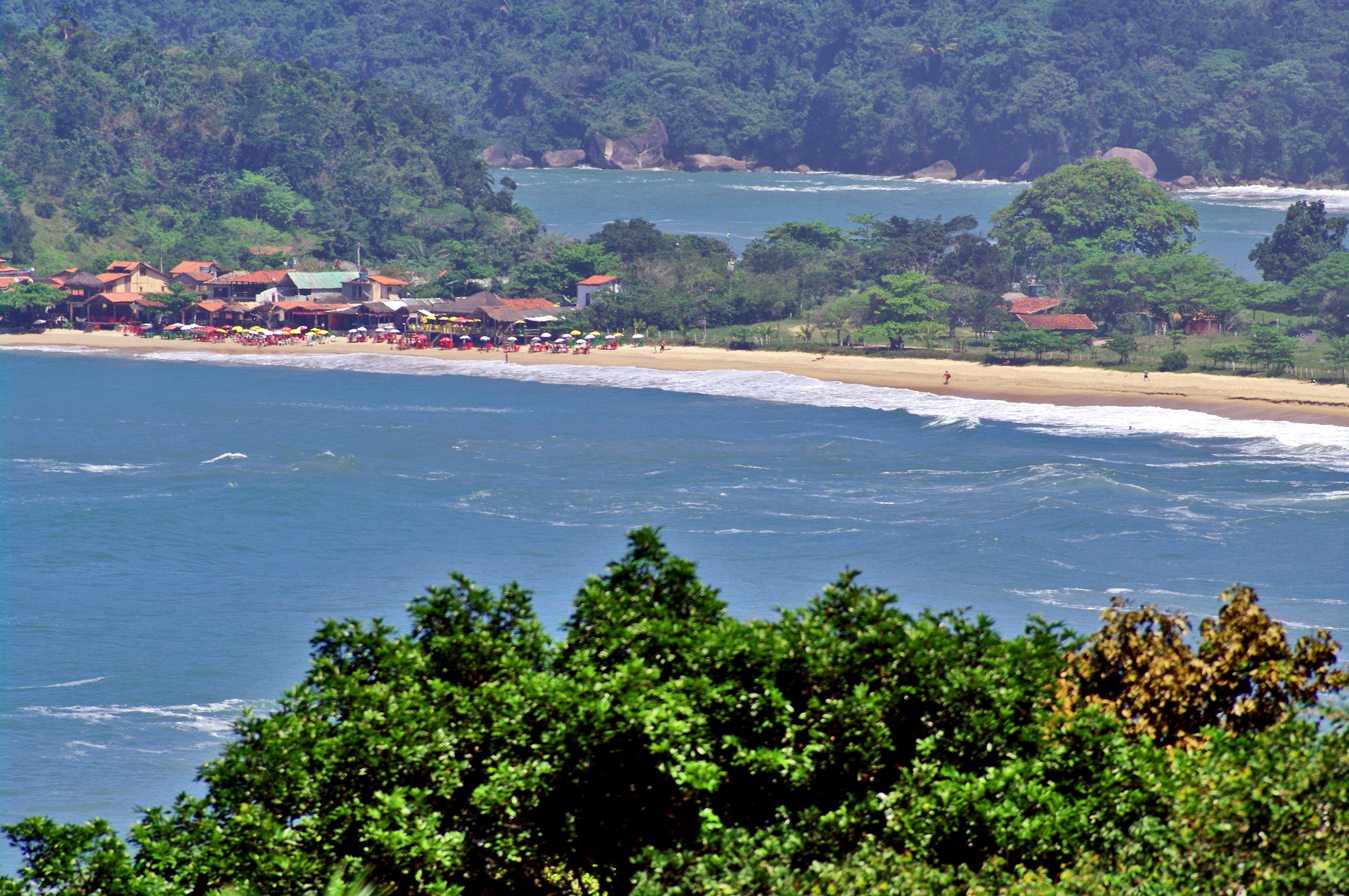
Overlooking the beach

Trindade (Portuguese for trinity) is a bairro in the Municipality of Paraty, located at the south-western tip of the federal state of Rio de Janeiro of Brazil, right on the border to São Paulo. Trindade was traditionally a Caiçara fishing village. Today, it is largely made up of craft shops and restaurants catering to tourists. Part of Trindade belongs to the Serra da Bocaina National Park and is protected by the Icmbio.

== History ==
Trindade was once inhabited by Tupi Indians, pirates and Portuguese. In the 1970s, it became known among hippies for its beautiful beaches. At the same time, Agência de Desarollo de Latino América (ADELA), a multinational based in Luxembourg, invested in the fishing village to create a resort and a luxury condo, which led to conflicts with the native population.

Since the 1990s, much of the economy of Trindade is based on tourism.
