= Praia dos Açores =

Beach-side district in the state of Santa Catarina in Brazil

Coordinates: 27.7843°S 48.5231°W

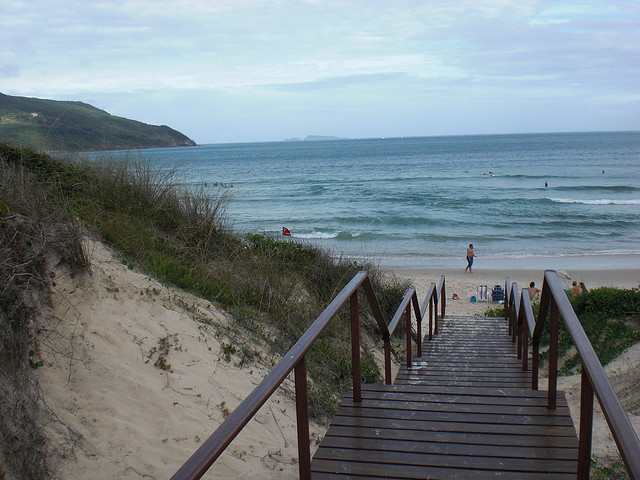

Praia dos Açores is a beach-side district on the south side of the Island of Santa Catarina in the state of Santa Catarina in Brazil. The beach is 31 km from the Centro downtown region of Florianópolis.
