= Praia de Naufragados =

Beach on Santa Catarina Island in Florianópolis, Santa Catarina, Brazil

Coordinates: 27.8339°S 48.5630°W

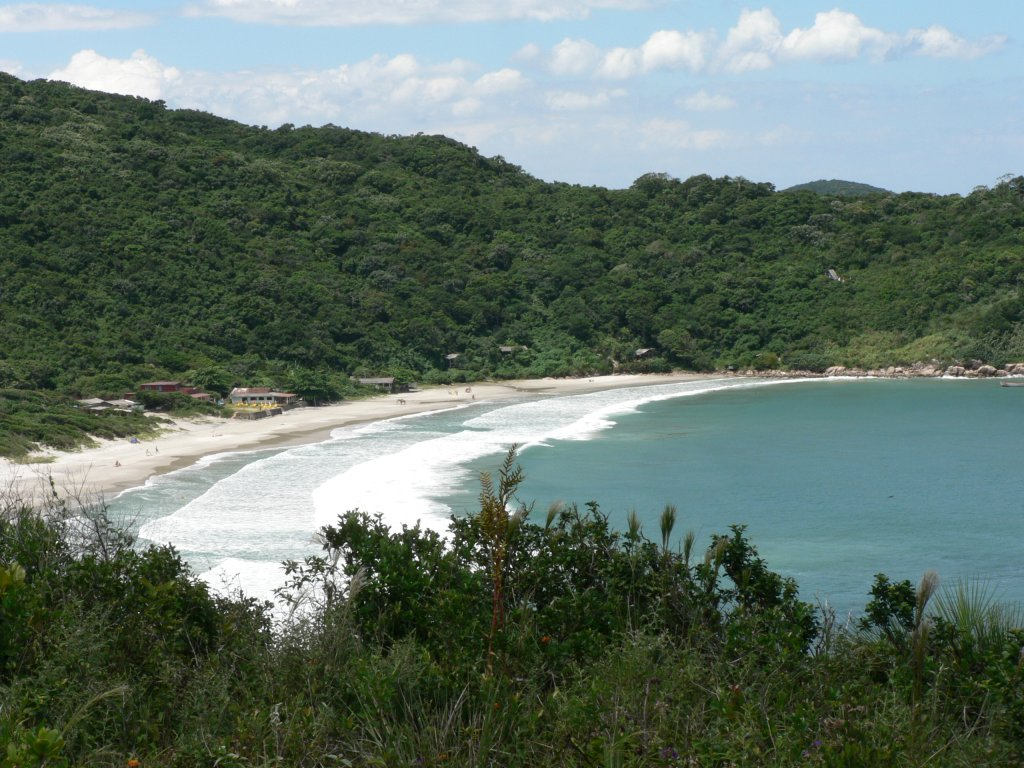

Praia de Naufragados is a beach on Santa Catarina Island in Florianópolis, Santa Catarina, Brazil. The beach is 1.45 km in length and is only accessible by a 4 km walking trail.
