= Praia do Gunga =

Beach in Alagoas, Brazil

Coordinates: 9°51′35″S 35°54′17″W

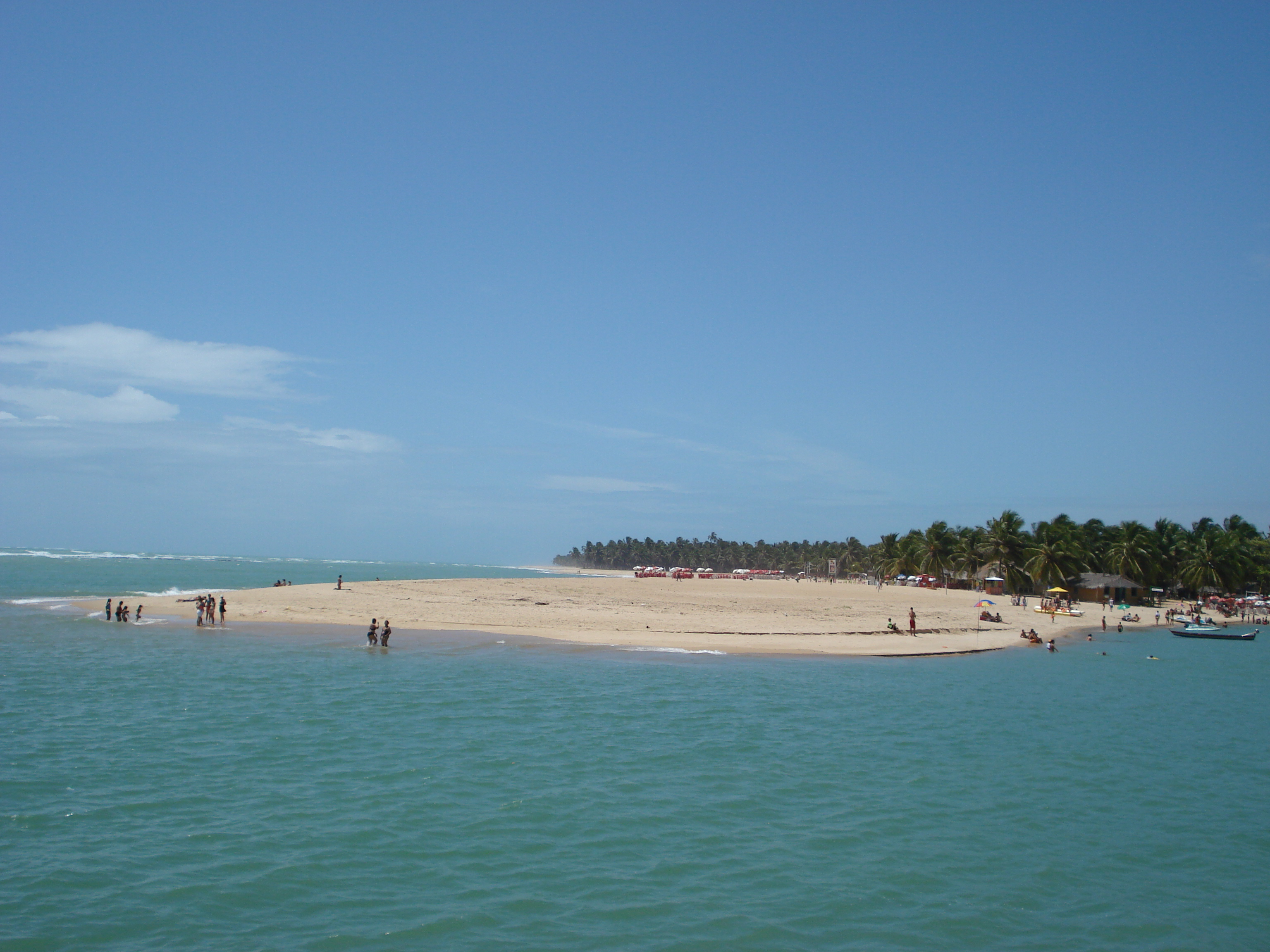
Praia do Gunga

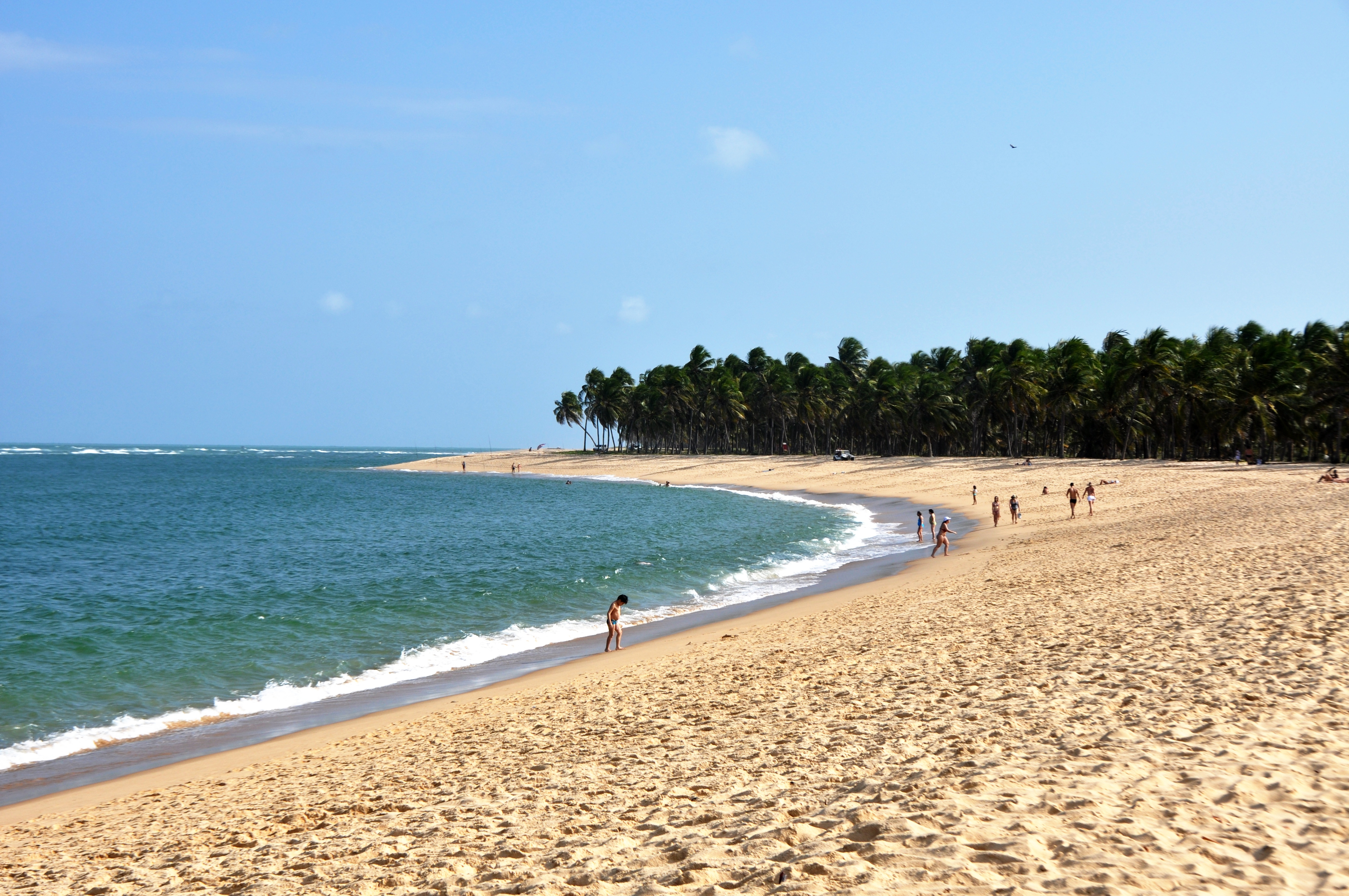
Praia do Gunga.

Praia do Gunga (Gunga's beach) is located 20 miles south of Maceió, Alagoas. It is considered to be one of the most beautiful beaches in Brazil.

The beach is surrounded by coconut trees and it positioned right between the Atlantic Ocean and Lagoa do Roteiro (Roteiro Lake). This position guarantees a unique color of the ocean surrounding the beach. It is bluer during the low tides and it turns greener during the high tides when the ocean waters meet the lake waters.

This beach is part of the Roteiro region and you can get there by boat from Barra de São Miguel or by car driving through a private property.

This is a very popular tourist site with many entertainment options such as boat trips to nearby "natural aquarium" or beaches such as Barra de São Miguel. There are small boats and kayaks available for rental there.
