= Boa Viagem, Recife =

- Neighborhood
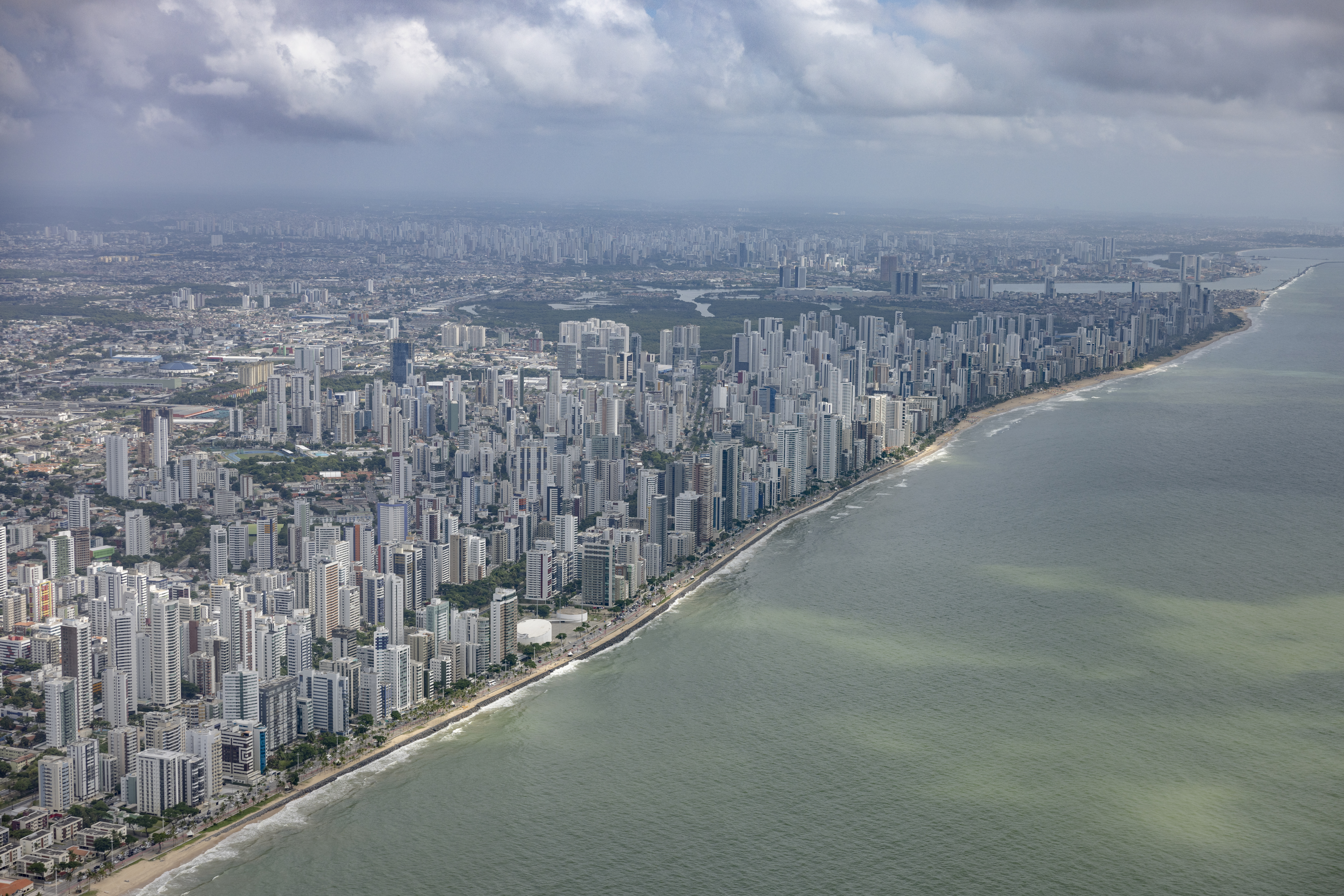
- Aerial view of Boa Viagem beach and Avenida Boa Viagem alongside

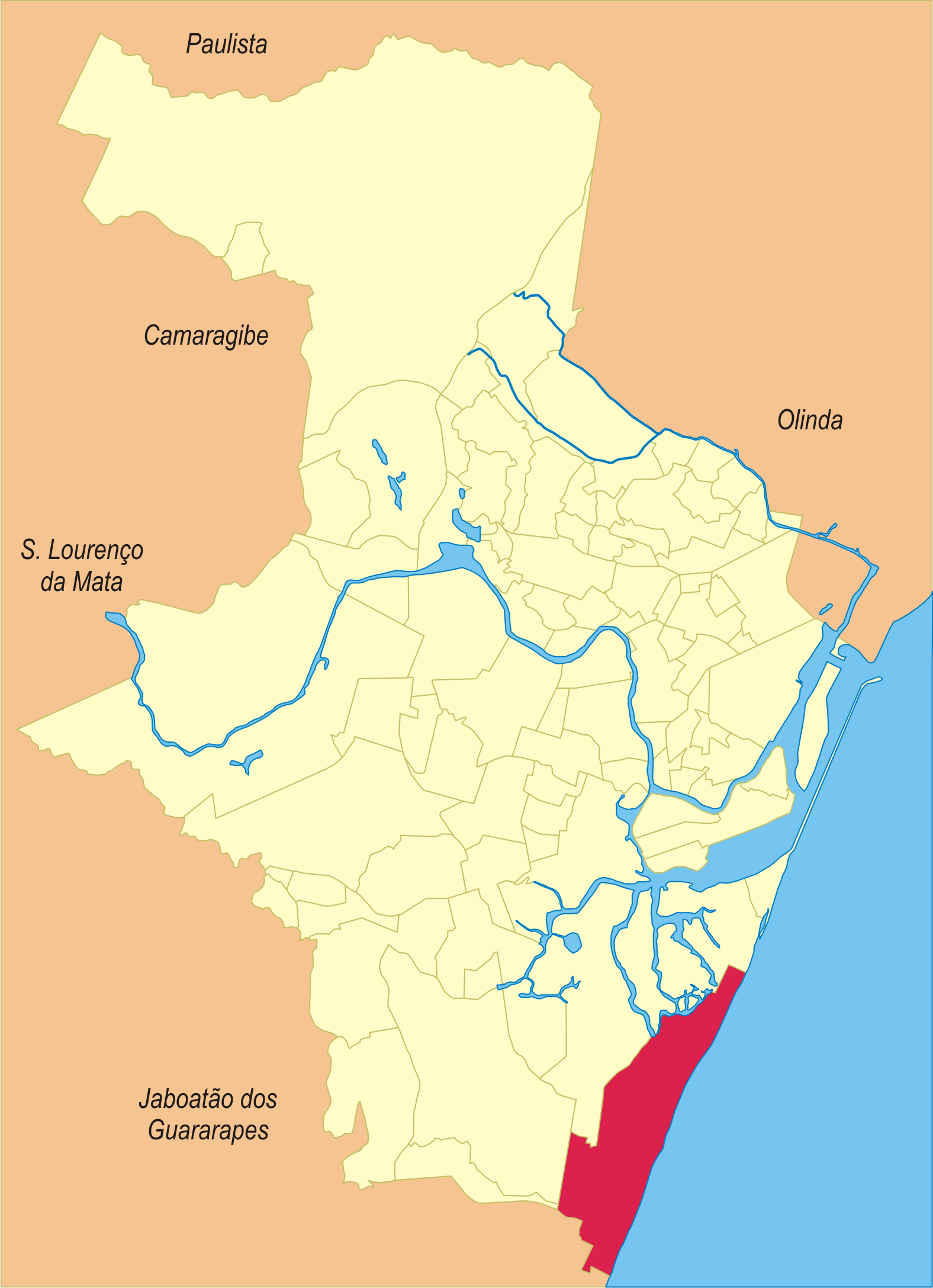
- Boa Viagem in Recife

- Recife in Brazil
- Coordinates: 8.05389°S 34.8808°W
- Country: Brazil
- Region: Northeast
- State: Pernambuco
- Municipality: Recife

Area
  - Total: 7.53 km^{2} (2.91 sq mi)

Population (2010)
  - Total: 122,922
  - Density: 16,300/km^{2} (42,300/sq mi)

Boa Viagem is a neighborhood in Recife, Pernambuco in the wealthy southern zone of the municipality. The neighborhood has one of the most visited beaches in Northeastern Brazil, Boa Viagem beach. The neighborhood has a population as of 2010 of 122,922 inhabitants, and an area of 753 hectares (2.91 sq mi).

Thousands regularly gather on its wide sandy beaches that stretch for 8 km (5.0 mi). However, the beach is plagued by tiger shark attacks since Suape port was built in the 1990s, thought to have disrupted the sharks' behavior. Boa Viagem is the longest stretch of urbanized seafront in Brazil; its coastal reef calms the waves and helps keep the water at 25 °C (77 °F). Pina, Recife and Piedade, Jaboatão are the neighboring beaches.

The district is a center of the city's social life. It hosts one of the biggest shopping centers in Brazil and South America—Shopping Center Recife with 465 stores and nearly 2,000,000 square feet (190,000 m^{2}) of area. Boa Viagem is also home to Shopping Rio Mar, a high-end shopping center located along the coast of the river Capibaribe.

Boa Viagem had a human development index in 2000 with 0.964, rivalling that of some Scandinavian countries, Japan, and Canada.

The neighborhood is near the Recife International Airport.
