= Praia dos Ingleses =

Beach in the north of the Santa Catarina Island

Coordinates: 27°26′07″S 48°23′29″W

- Beach
- Location: Ingleses do Rio Vermelho, Florianópolis, Santa Catarina, Brazil
- Etymology: Named after an English shipwreck

Dimensions
  - Length: 4.83 km

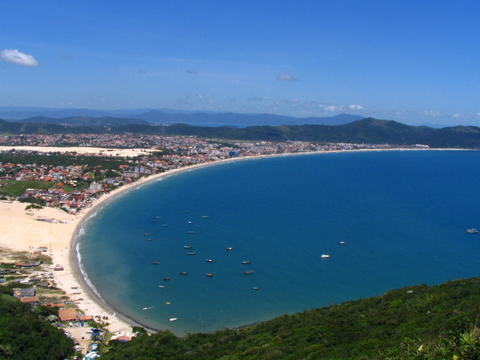
Praia dos Ingleses

Praia dos Ingleses (English: Beach of the Englishmen) is a beach located in the neighborhood of Ingleses do Rio Vermelho, in the north of the Santa Catarina Island 31 km from the Centro downtown district of Florianópolis the capital of the state of Santa Catarina, Brazil.

The beach is 4.83 km long, open ocean, blue warm water, the right side of the beach has calm water ideal for taking children and the elderly and on the other side, the waves are strong and conducive to surfing, bodyboarding and Standup paddleboarding. And a lot of sand where sandboarding is practiced by people of all ages on the beach's dunes. Boating tours are also conducted.

Praia dos Ingleses is one of the busiest destinations on the island year round. In the summer it is the resort with the second largest concentration of Argentine tourists, second only to Canasvieiras. The area has grown and has become a major tourist center, with great infrastructure (shopping center, bars, shows, restaurants, nightclubs, hotels and pousadas ). It is also the residential beach area, where the largest number of residents who exceed 10,000. Today, many even say that Ingleses is a city and not a neighborhood.

North of Praia dos Ingleses, is Praia Brava, and south, Praia do Santinho, also in Ingleses do Rio Vermelho district.

Praia dos Ingleses means Beach of the Englishmen in Portuguese. The beach's name is due to an English ship that ran aground there. There are two theories about the ship's fate. The first says that she floated and went her way, leaving some of the crew on the island. The other says that it sank.
