= Mozambique Beach =

Beach in Brazil

Coordinates: 27.5012°S 48.4019°W

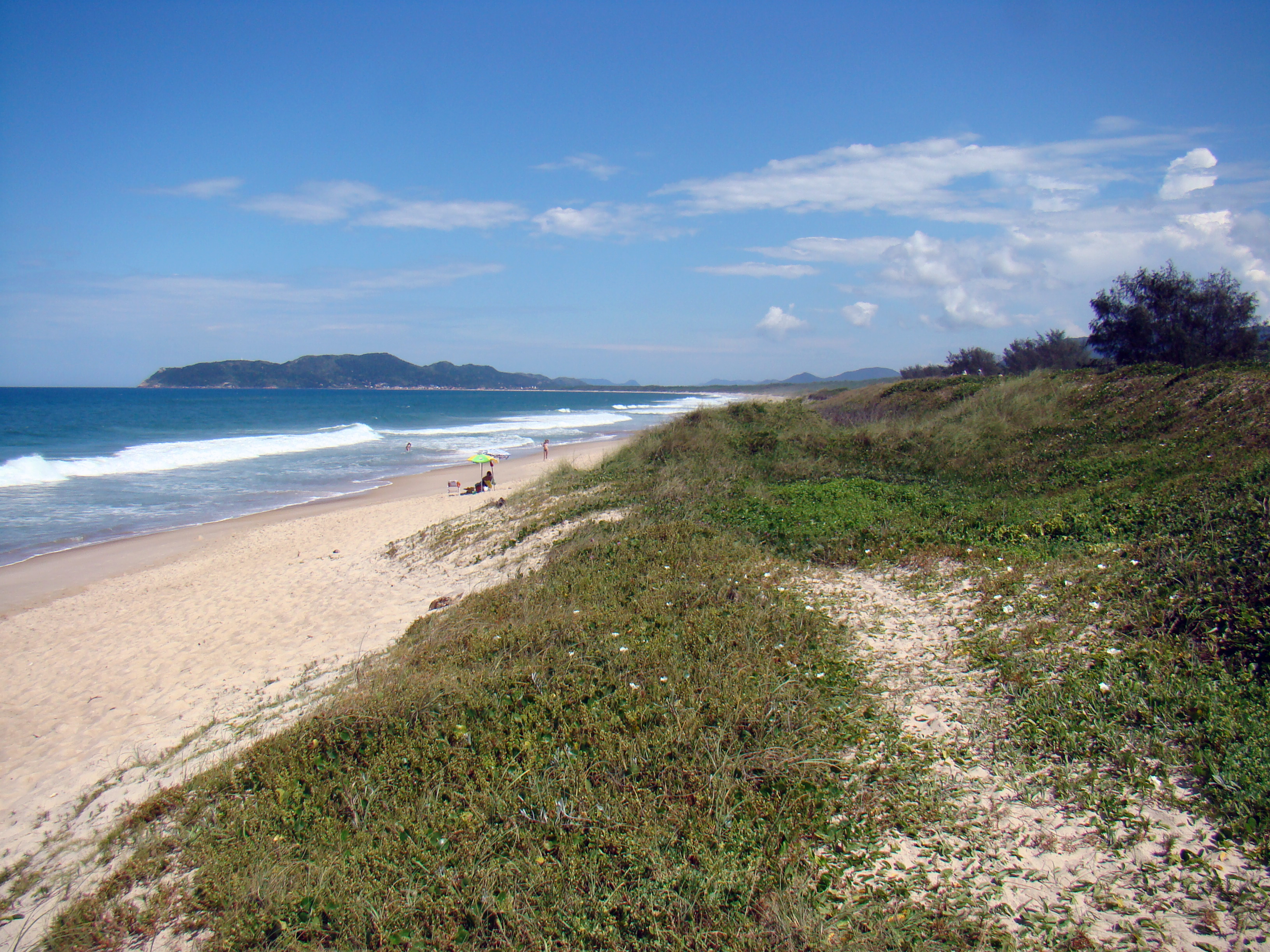

Mozambique Beach (Portuguese: Praia de Moçambique) is the longest beach on Santa Catarina Island in Brazil at 13.5 km in length. The beach is located to the north of Barra da Lagoa in the east of the island.
