= Mole Beach =

Beach located in the city of Florianópolis, Brazil

Coordinates: 27°36′09″S 48°25′58″W

Praia Mole
- Beach
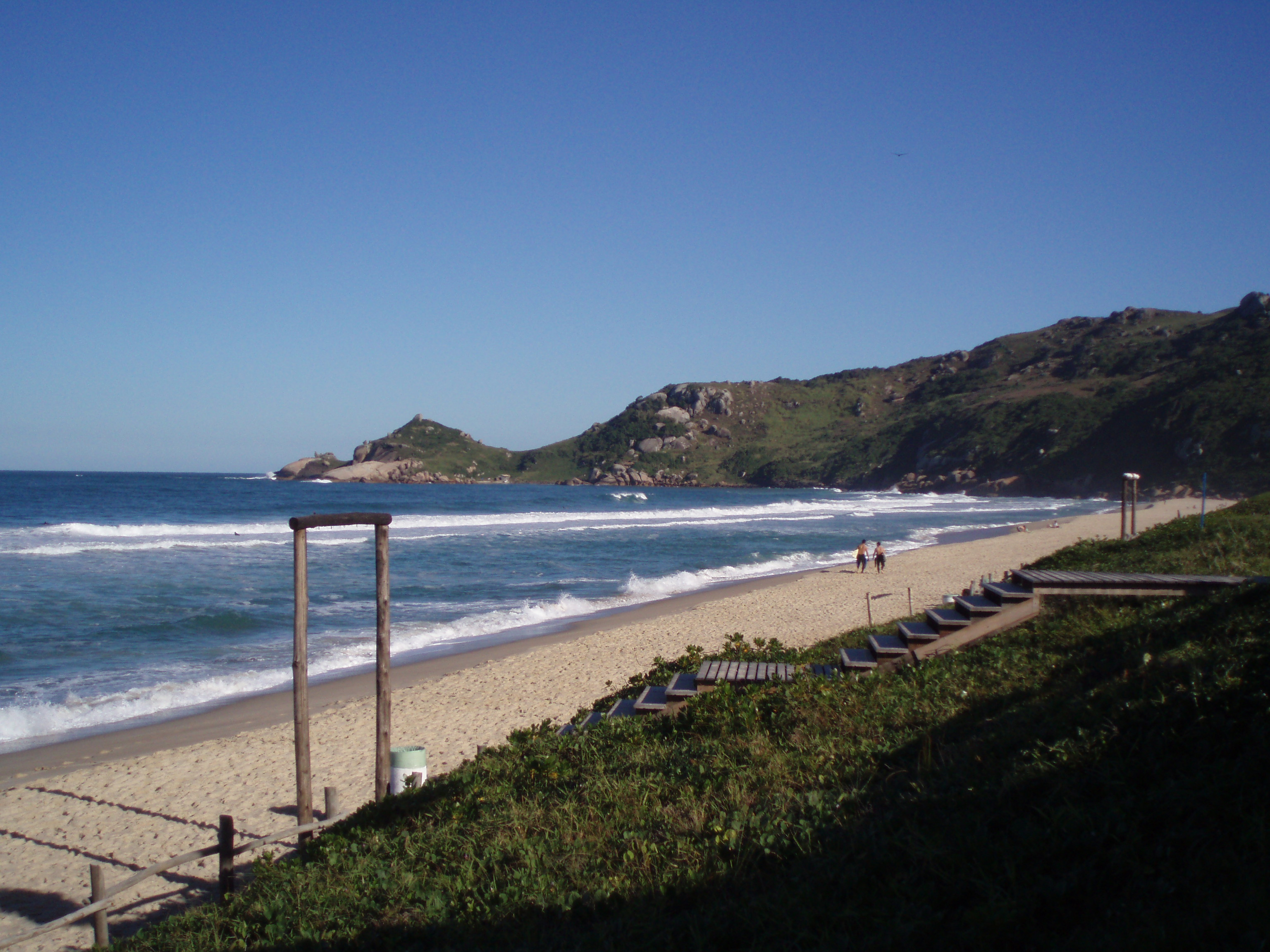
- View of Praia Mole
- Interactive map of Praia Mole
- Location: Florianópolis, Santa Catarina, Brazil

Dimensions
  - Length: 960m

Mole Beach (Portuguese: Praia Mole, pronounced [ˈpɾajɐ ˈmɔli]) is a beach located on the eastern coast of Santa Catarina Island in the city of Florianópolis, Santa Catarina, Brazil. The beach is approximately 960 meters long and is known for attracting young people, surfers, paragliders and the LGBT community. It is an LGBT tourist spot in Florianópolis.

The word mole means 'soft' in Portuguese, referring to the beach's fine and soft sand.

== Location ==
Praia Mole lies about 15 km (9.3 miles) from downtown Florianópolis and 27 km (17 miles) from Canasvieiras, another popular beach in the north of the island. It is accessible via the SC-404 highway and connects to nearby beaches, such as Barra da Lagoa, Santinho and Ingleses via the SC-406.

Its proximity to the city makes Praia Mole one of the island's most frequented beaches, especially during the summer season. During the weekends, especially in the late afternoon, heavy traffic congestion is very common.

The beach also serves as the only land access point to its neighboring beach, Praia da Galheta; a naturist reserve where nudity is permitted.

== Infrastructure ==
Compared to the more developed northern beaches of the island, Praia Mole has limited infrastructure with only a few bars along the shore. This contributes to its appeal as a more natural and less commercialized destination.

One of the best-equipped lifeguard stations on the island, operated by the Santa Catarina Military Fire Brigade, is located here, due to the strong waves and a steep underwater slope found close to the shore.

There are scarce accommodation options near the beach. An eco-hotel is located along the main road, while additional lodging can be found in the neighborhoods of Lagoa da Conceição and Barra da Lagoa.

== Surfing ==
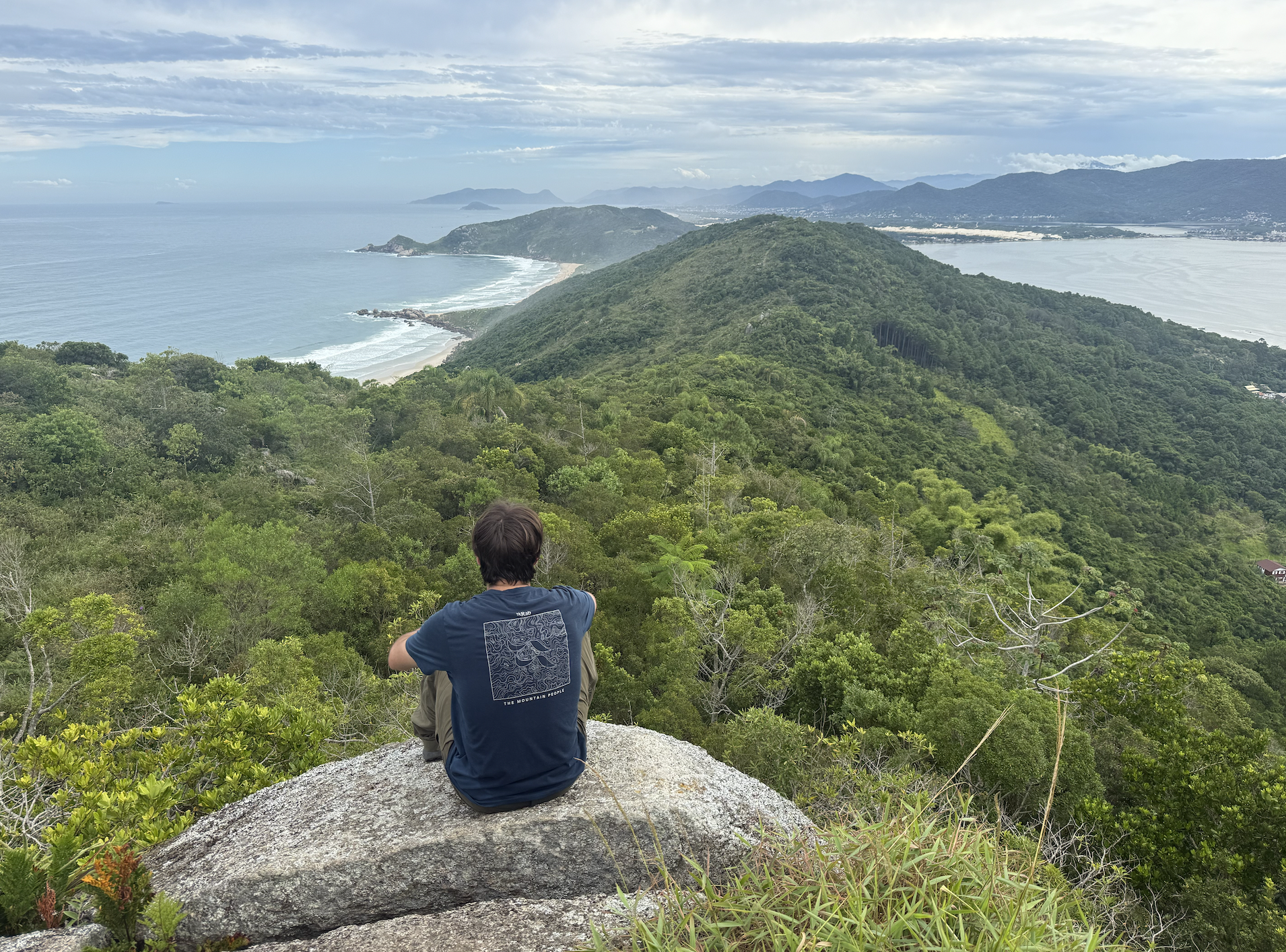
Mole Beach as seen from Mirante da Boa Vista.

Praia Mole is considered one of the top surf spots in Brazil, drawing both local and international surfers. It has hosted major competitions, such as events from the ASP World Tour.

== LGBT Community ==
Florianópolis is one of Brazil's top gay-friendly destinations, often rivaling Rio de Janeiro in popularity. The Bar do Deca, located at the northern end of Praia Mole, is a well-known daytime meeting point for the LGBT community.

The island hosts a 10-day gay carnival during the summer that attracts thousands of visitors annually. Since 2008, The Week International—one of the largest gay nightclubs in South America—has organized both Réveillon (New Year's Eve) and gay carnival parties at the Praia Mole Hotel.

== Ecotourism ==
Praia Mole is also a destination for ecotourism, particularly hiking. Two popular trails include:

- The Barra/Galheta Trail: Starts at Barra da Lagoa and ascends through the dense Atlantic Forest vegetation. The summit offers panoramic views of Praia da Barra, Lagoa da Conceição, and the Rio Vermelho Ecological Reserve. The trail ends at Praia da Galheta.
- The Praia do Gravatá Trail: Starts at the southern end of Praia Mole and leads to the hidden Praia do Gravatá. The trail's higher elevations are popular for paragliding.
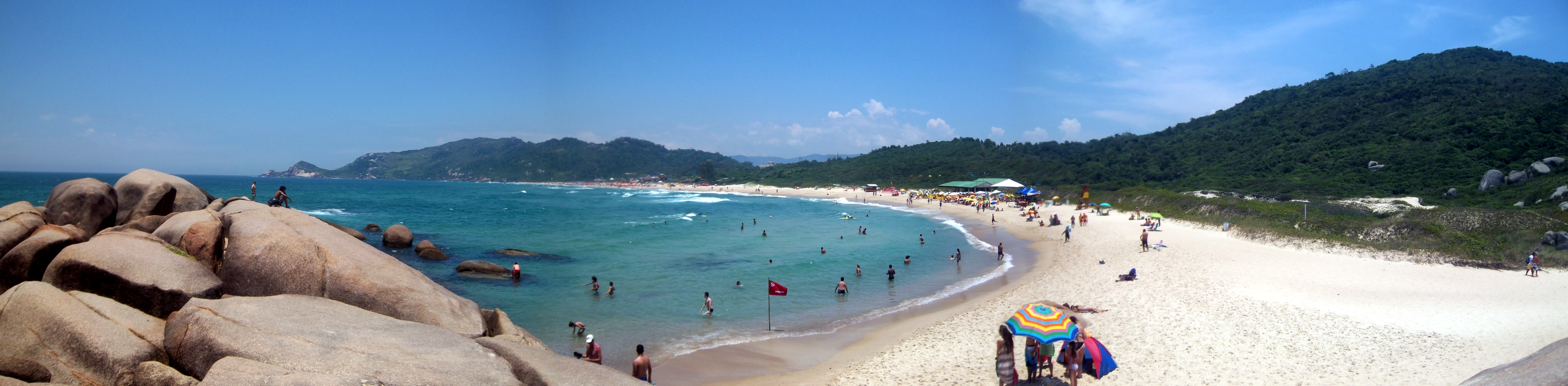
Panorámica de Praia Mole, en Florianópolis.

== See also ==
- Florianópolis
- LGBT rights in Brazil
- Surfing in Brazil
- Naturism in Brazil
