= Carijós Ecological Station =

- Estação Ecológica de Carijós
- IUCN category Ia (strict nature reserve)
- Location within Brazil
- Nearest city: Florianópolis, Santa Catarina
- Coordinates: 27.465°S 48.510°W
- Area: 759 hectares (1,880 acres)
- Designation: Ecological station
- Created: 20 July 1987

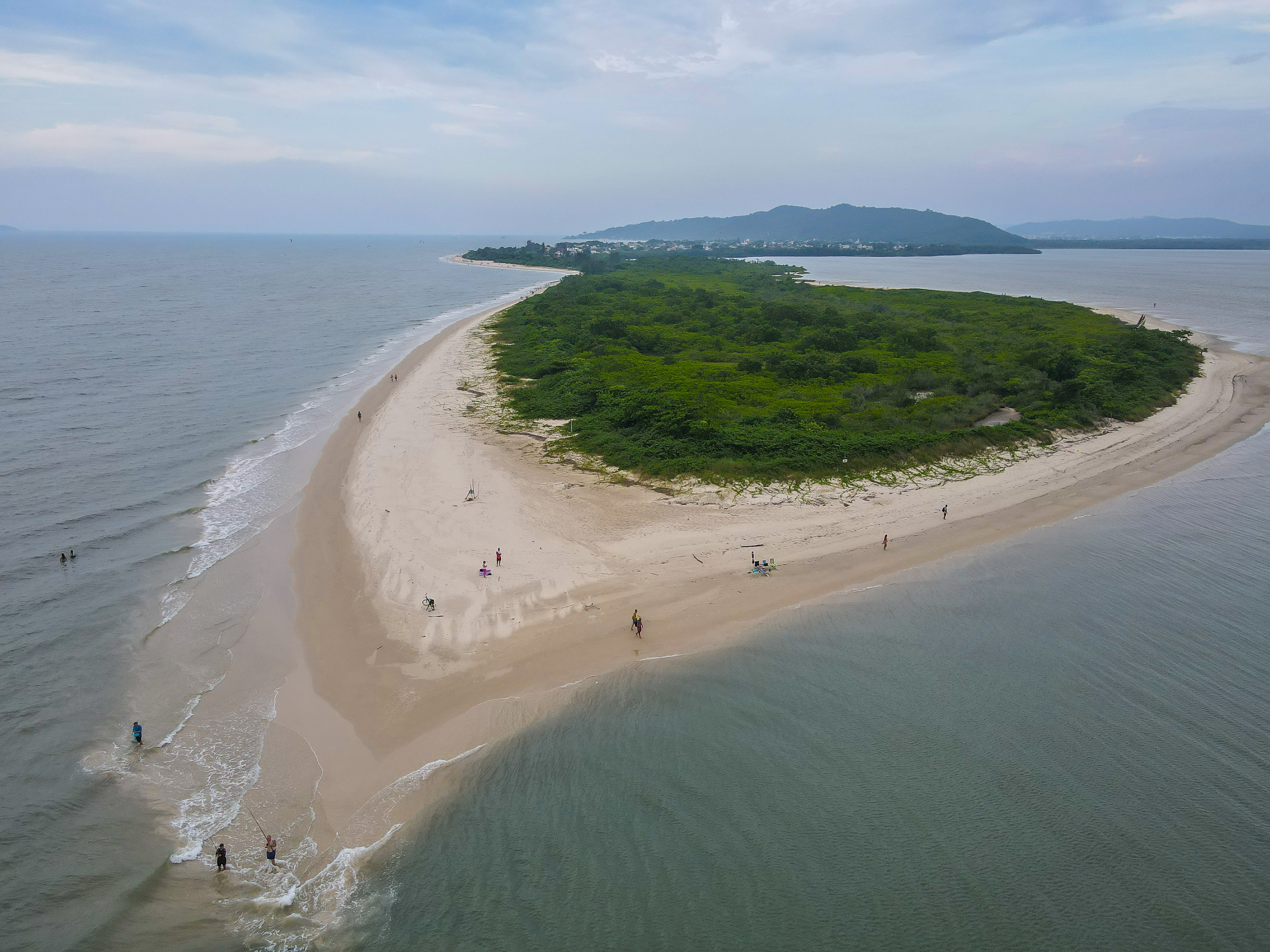
Daniela Beach, Carijós Ecological Reserve

Carijós Ecological Station (Portuguese: Estação Ecológica de Carijós) is a coastal marine ecological station in Florianópolis, Santa Catarina, Brazil.

== Location ==
The Carijós Ecological Station was established by decree of 20 July 1987, covering an area of 7.5933 square kilometres (2.9318 sq mi) in the Florianópolis municipality. It is managed by the Chico Mendes Institute for Biodiversity Conservation.

== Conservation ==
Carijós Ecological Station contains part of the Atlantic forest biome and is fully protected. The purpose is conservation of the mangrove ecosystem on Santa Catarina Island. The station is closed to the public, with visits allowed only for environmental education purposes. As of 2009 the Ecological Station was a "strict nature reserve" under IUCN protected area category Ia. In 2013 the ecological station and the National Center for Research and Conservation of Wild Birds (CEMAVE) were involved in monitoring the health of wild birds in federally-administered conservation units of Florianópolis. This was the first systematic study of the prevalence of diseases and parasites of the local avifauna.

== Sources ==
- Esec de Carijós (in Portuguese), Chico Mendes Institute for Biodiversity Conservation, archived from the original on 2015-10-24
- Estação Ecológica de Carijós (in Portuguese), Ministerio do Meio Ambiente
- Portal Brasil (30 December 2013), Estação Ecológica de Carijós (SC) monitora avifauna local (in Portuguese)
- Triana, Elisa (29 May 2009), "Strict Nature Reserves in Brazil", The Encyclopedia of Earth
