= Praia Brava =

Beach at the northern end of the island of Santa Catarina Island

Coordinates: 27°23′56″S 48°24′47″W

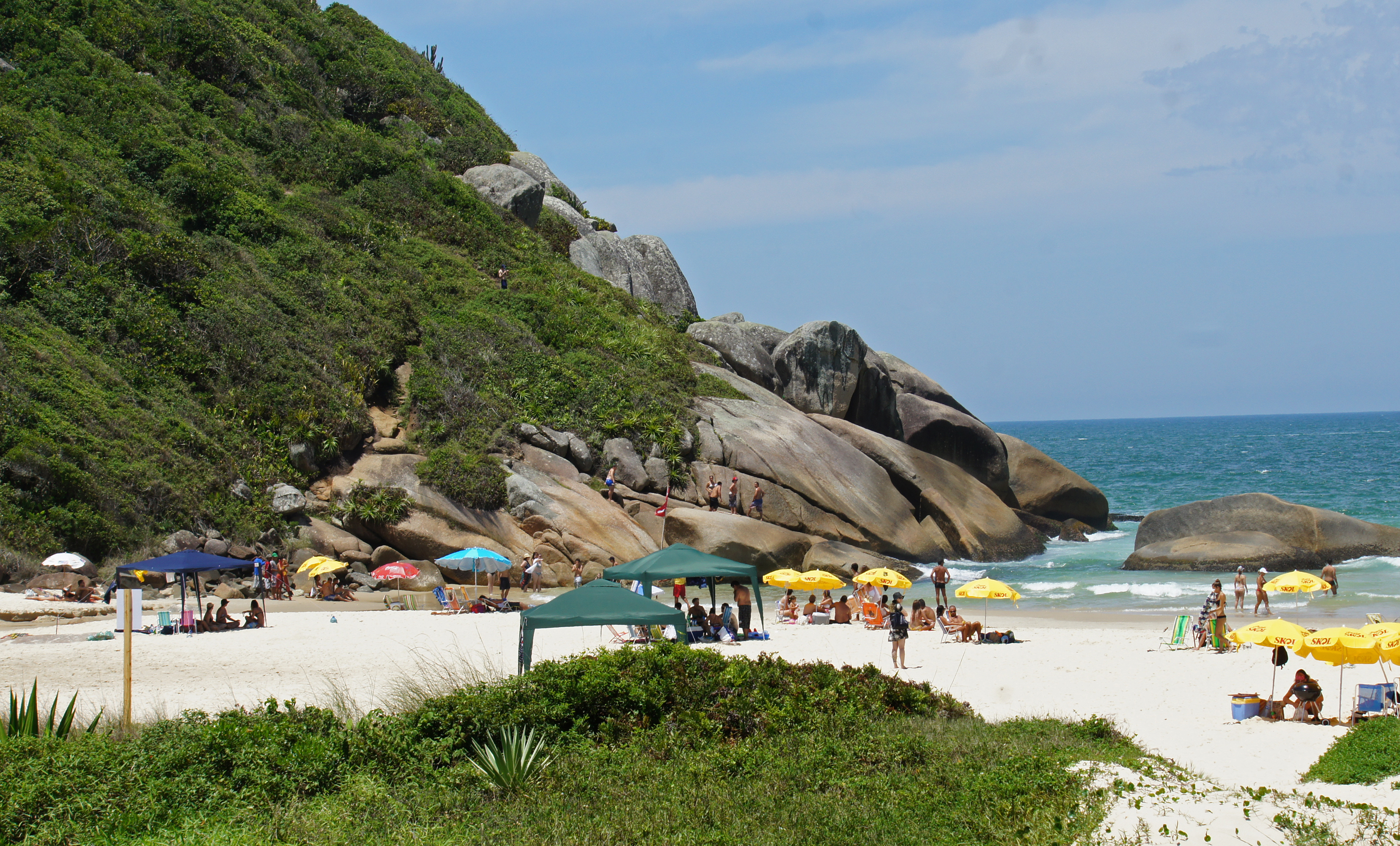
Floripa 12 2014 Brava 1079.JPG

Praia Brava is an upscale neighborhood located in the north of Santa Catarina Island, in the municipality of Florianópolis, the capital of the Brazilian state of Santa Catarina. The beach offers clean, crystal-clear water, natural beauty, and excellent waves for surfing and bodyboarding.

The sand is fine, yellow, and soft. The beach stretches for approximately 1.5 kilometers, with a sand strip ranging from 25 to 80 meters in width. The area features high-end beachfront apartment complexes as well as excellent houses situated close to the sea, conveniently located near the beach's bars and restaurants. During peak season, the beach attracts many young people looking for entertainment, as events featuring DJs and bands are held there.

The location is also a hotspot for surfers; the waves create a perfect environment for the sport.

On January 4, 2026, the beach gained national attention due to an incident involving the assault of a well-known local dog named Orelha. According to the police, the dog was attacked at the location, suffering a blunt-force blow to the head. Although the dog was rescued, it passed away at a veterinary clinic the following day.

- Distance from the city center: 25 km
- Distance from the airport: 37 km
- Nearby beaches: Ingleses, Ponta de Canas, Lagoinha do Norte.
