= Florianópolis Gay Carnival =

LGBT event in Brazil

The Week Floripa during the carnival.

Florianópolis Gay Carnival (often just referred to as Floripa Gay Carnival) is an LGBTQ carnival located in Florianópolis, Brazil. The carnival includes the Pop Gay competition, a beauty contest for drag queens and transgender people. The Pop Gay Festival during Carnival and our pride parade, both with around 40,000 to 50,000 people.

The Bar of Deca, is the most famous gay beach bar in the city, has DJs from 1 PM until well after the sunset in Summer, in Mole Beach, most frequented by LGBTQ people.

== See also ==
- List of LGBT events
- LGBT rights in Brazil
- LGBT rights in the World
