= Bird ringing =

Attachment of a tag to a wild bird to enable individual identification

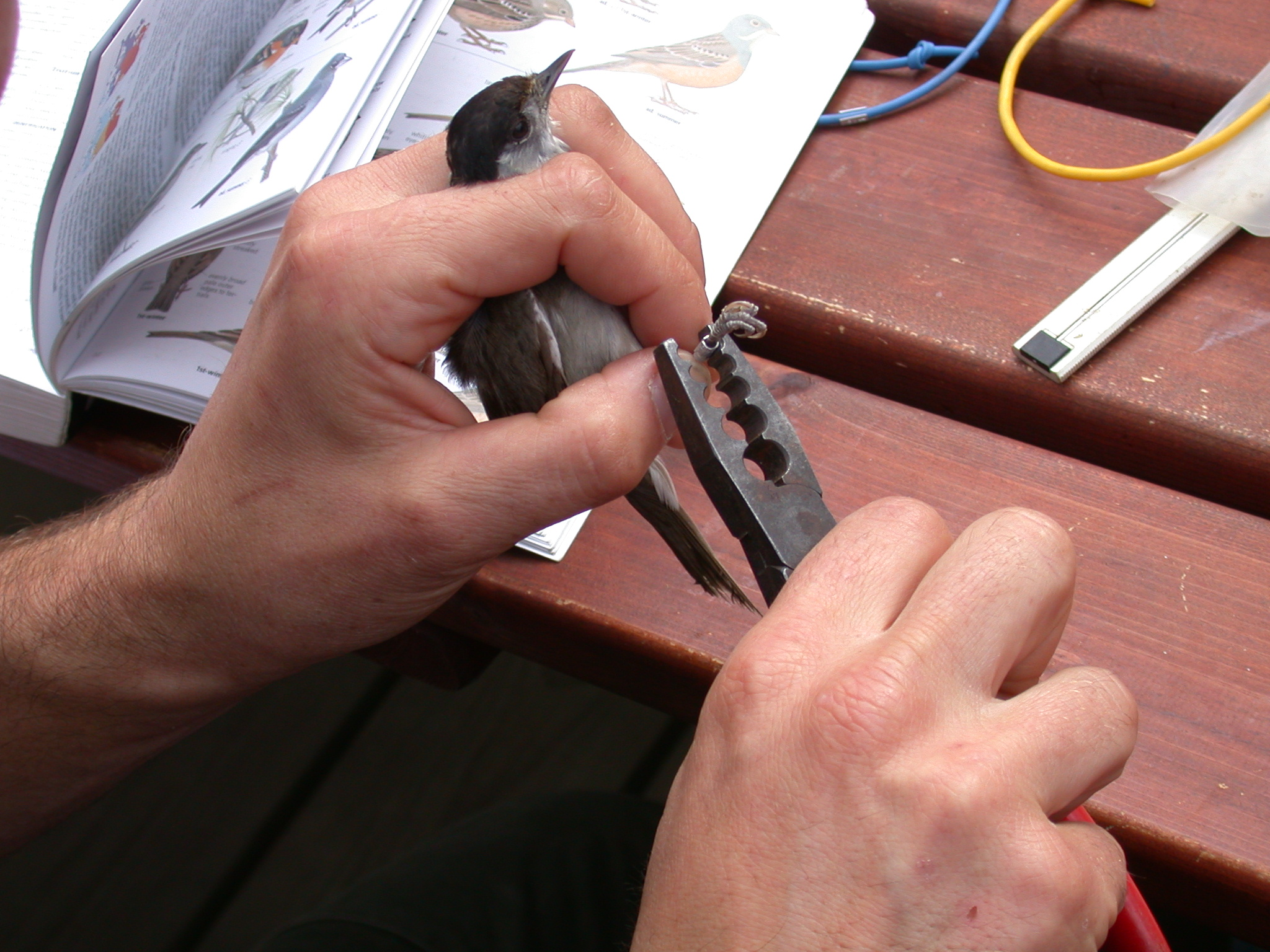
A researcher uses ringing pliers to attach a ring to the leg of a Eurasian blackcap.

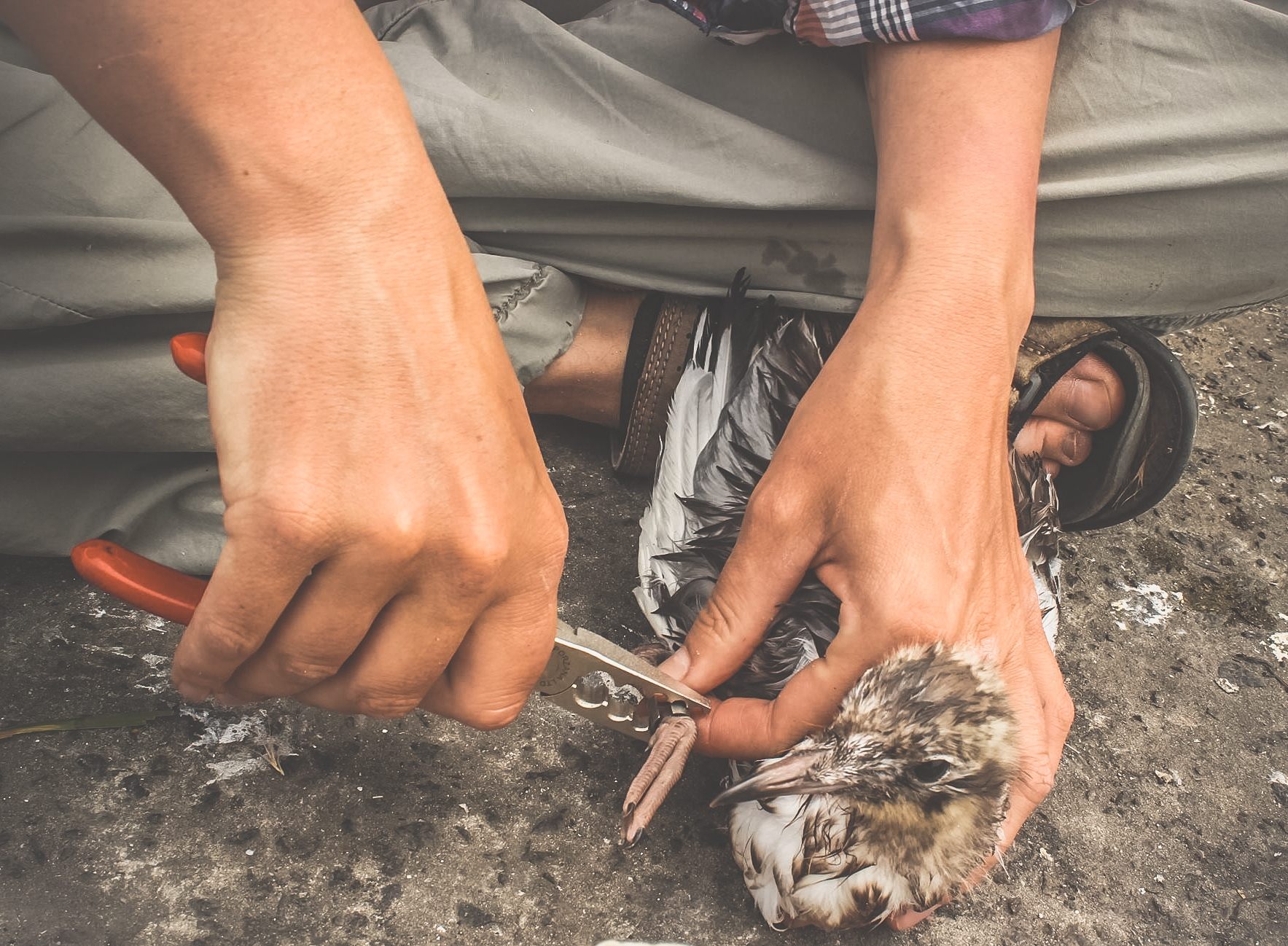
Ringing a black-headed gull (Chroicocephalus ridibundus) nestling

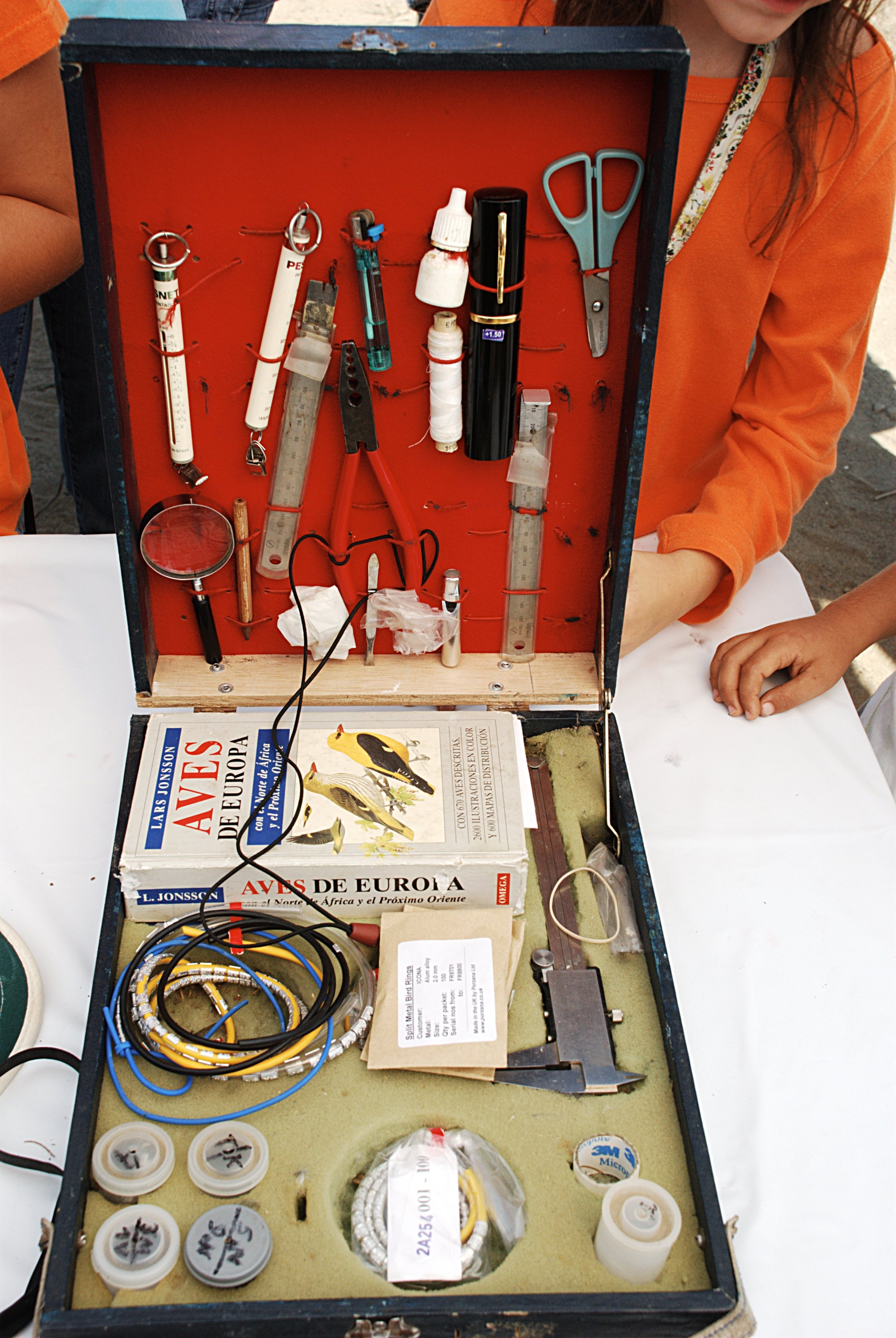
A box of equipment for measuring, weighing and ringing birds

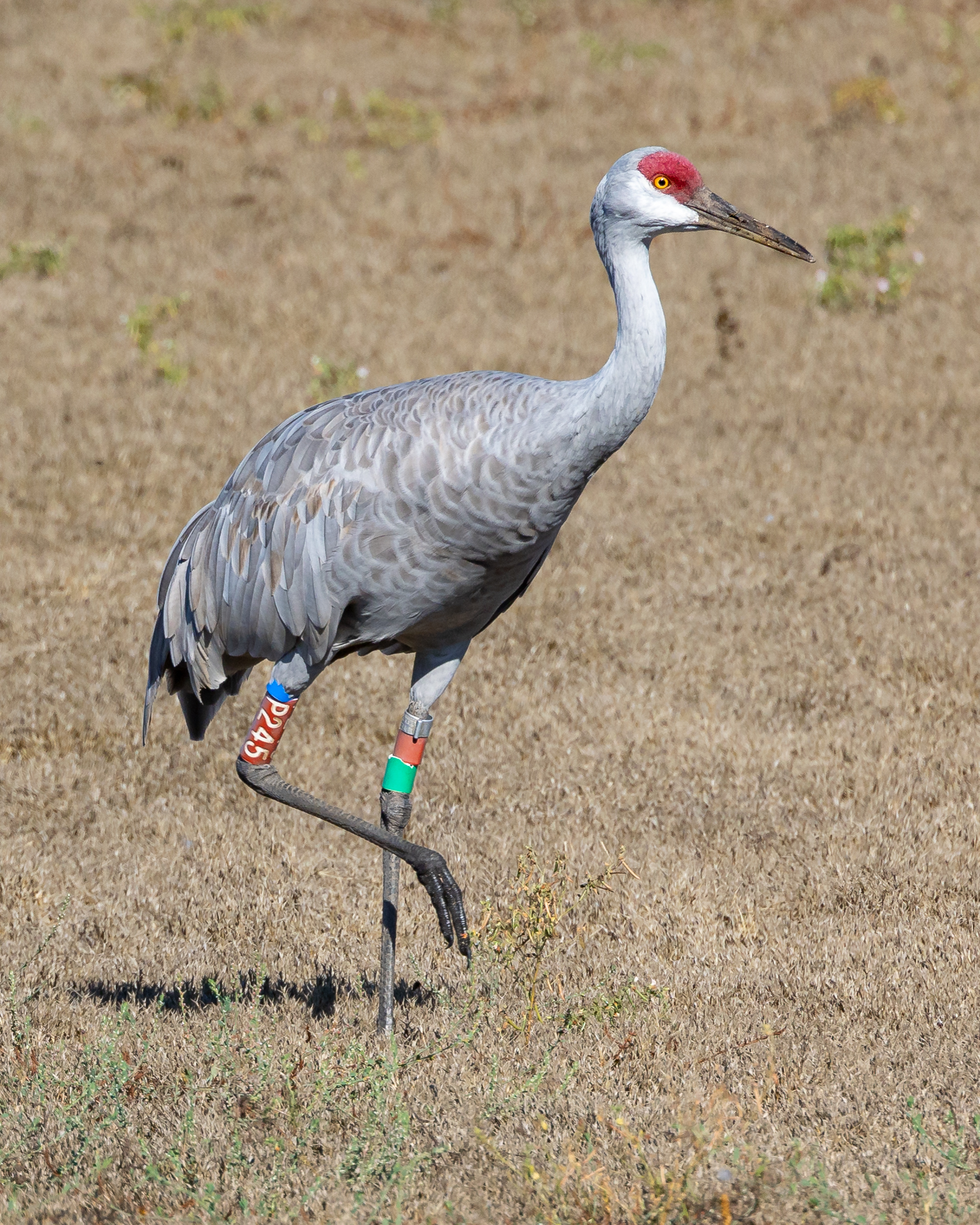
Ringed sandhill crane (Antigone canadensis) at the Llano Seco Unit of the Sacramento National Wildlife Refuge Complex

Bird ringing (UK) or bird banding (US) is the attachment of a small, individually numbered metal or plastic tag to the leg or wing of a wild bird to enable individual identification. This helps in keeping track of the movements of the bird and its life history. It is common to take measurements and examine the conditions of feather moult, subcutaneous fat, age indications and sex during capture for ringing. The subsequent recapture, recovery, or observation of the bird can provide information on migration, longevity, mortality, population, territoriality, feeding behaviour, and other aspects that are studied by ornithologists. Other methods of marking birds may also be used to allow for field based identification that does not require capture.

== History ==
The earliest recorded attempts to mark birds were made by Roman soldiers. For instance during the Punic Wars in 218 BC a crow was released by a besieged garrison, which suggests that this was an established practice. Quintus Fabius Pictor used a thread on the bird's leg to send a message back. In another case in history, a knight interested in chariot races during the time of Pliny (AD 1) took crows to Volterra, 135 miles (217 km) away and released the crows with information on the race winners.

Falconers in the Middle Ages fitted tags on their falcons with seals of their owners. In England from around 1560 or so, swans were marked with a swan mark, a nick on the bill.

In North America, John James Audubon has been hailed as the progenitor of bird banding. However, his story is of questionable authenticity. In 1834, Audubon claimed that he tied silver threads to the legs of young eastern phoebes at his farm (Mill Grove) in Pennsylvania in 1805, and then resighted two of the birds as adults in 1806. However, the return rate he reported (40% of nestlings) is an extreme outlier compared to modern data (e.g., 1.6% of 549 banded nestlings, and 1.3% of 217 nestlings), and Audubon was in France when he claimed to have resighted the marked phoebes.

In September of 1887 an albatross was found near Trigg Island, Western Australia with a tin collar and a message attached. The message, written in French, translated to "13 shipwrecked people took refuge on the Crozet Islands on 4 August 1887". The French sailors had wrecked on the Crozet Islands in March of 1887, the sailors were believed to have died two months before the French warship La Meurthe arrived in December of 1887. One of the earliest records of a banded bird, the albatross travelled over 3027 miles (4904 km) in around 50 days.

Ernest Thompson Seton marked snow buntings in Manitoba with ink in 1882. Ringing of birds for more extensive scientific purposes was started in 1899 by Hans Christian Cornelius Mortensen, a Danish schoolteacher, using aluminium rings on European starlings. Mortensen had tried using zinc rings as early as 1890 but found these were too heavy. The first ringing scheme was established in Germany by Johannes Thienemann in 1903 at the Rossitten Bird Observatory on the Baltic Coast of East Prussia. This was followed by Hungary in 1908, Great Britain in 1909 (by Arthur Landsborough Thomson in Aberdeen and Harry Witherby in England), Yugoslavia in 1910 and the Scandinavian countries between 1911 and 1914. Paul Bartsch of the Smithsonian Institution is credited with the first modern banding in the U.S.: he banded 23 black-crowned night herons in 1902. Leon J. Cole of the University of Wisconsin founded the American Bird Banding Association in 1909; this organisation oversaw banding until the establishment of federal programs in the U.S. (1920) and Canada (1923) pursuant to the Migratory Bird Treaty of 1918.

== Terminology and techniques ==
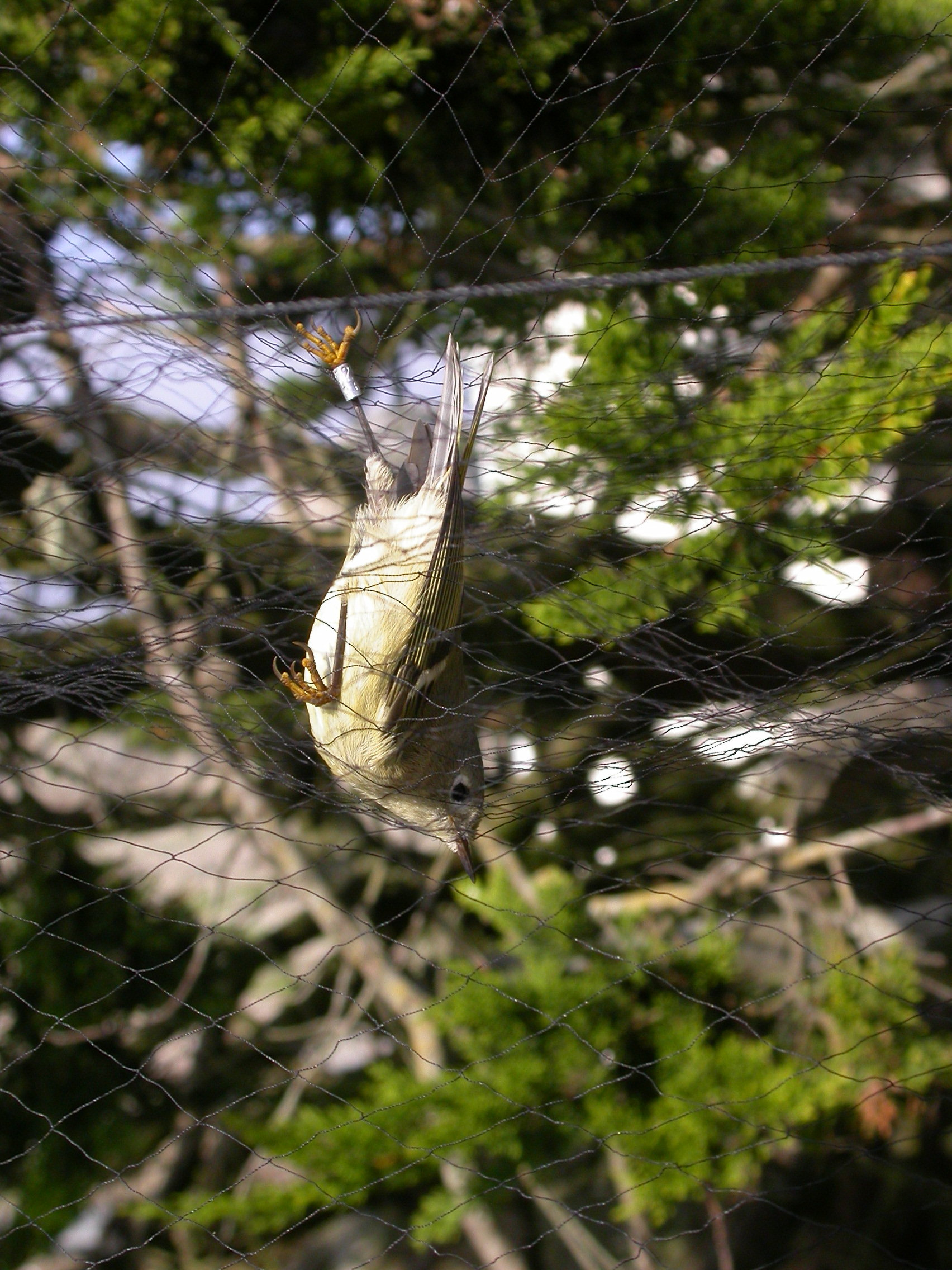
A ringed ruby-crowned kinglet recaptured in a mist net

Bird ringing is the term used in the UK and in some other parts of Europe and the world. Bird banding is the term used in the United States. Organised ringing efforts are called ringing or banding schemes, and the organisations that run them are ringing or banding authorities. Birds are ringed rather than rung. Those who ring or band birds are known as ringers or banders, and they are typically active at ringing or banding stations.

Birds may be captured by being taken as young birds at the nest, or as adults, captured in fine mist nets, baited traps, Heligoland traps, drag nets, cannon nets, or by other methods. Raptors may be caught by many methods, including bal-chatri traps.

When a bird is caught, a ring of suitable size (usually made of aluminium or other lightweight material) is attached to the bird's leg, has a unique number, and a contact address. The bird is often weighed and measured, examined for data relevant to the ringer's project, and then released. The rings are very light, and are designed to have no adverse effect on the birds – indeed, the whole basis of using ringing to gain data about the birds is that ringed birds should behave in all respects in the same way as the unringed population. The birds so tagged can then be identified when they are re-trapped, or found dead, later.

When a ringed bird is found, and the ring number read and reported back to the ringer or ringing authority, this is termed a ringing recovery or a control. The finder can contact the address on the ring, give the unique number, and be told the known history of the bird's movements. Many national ringing/banding authorities now also accept reports by phone or on official web sites.

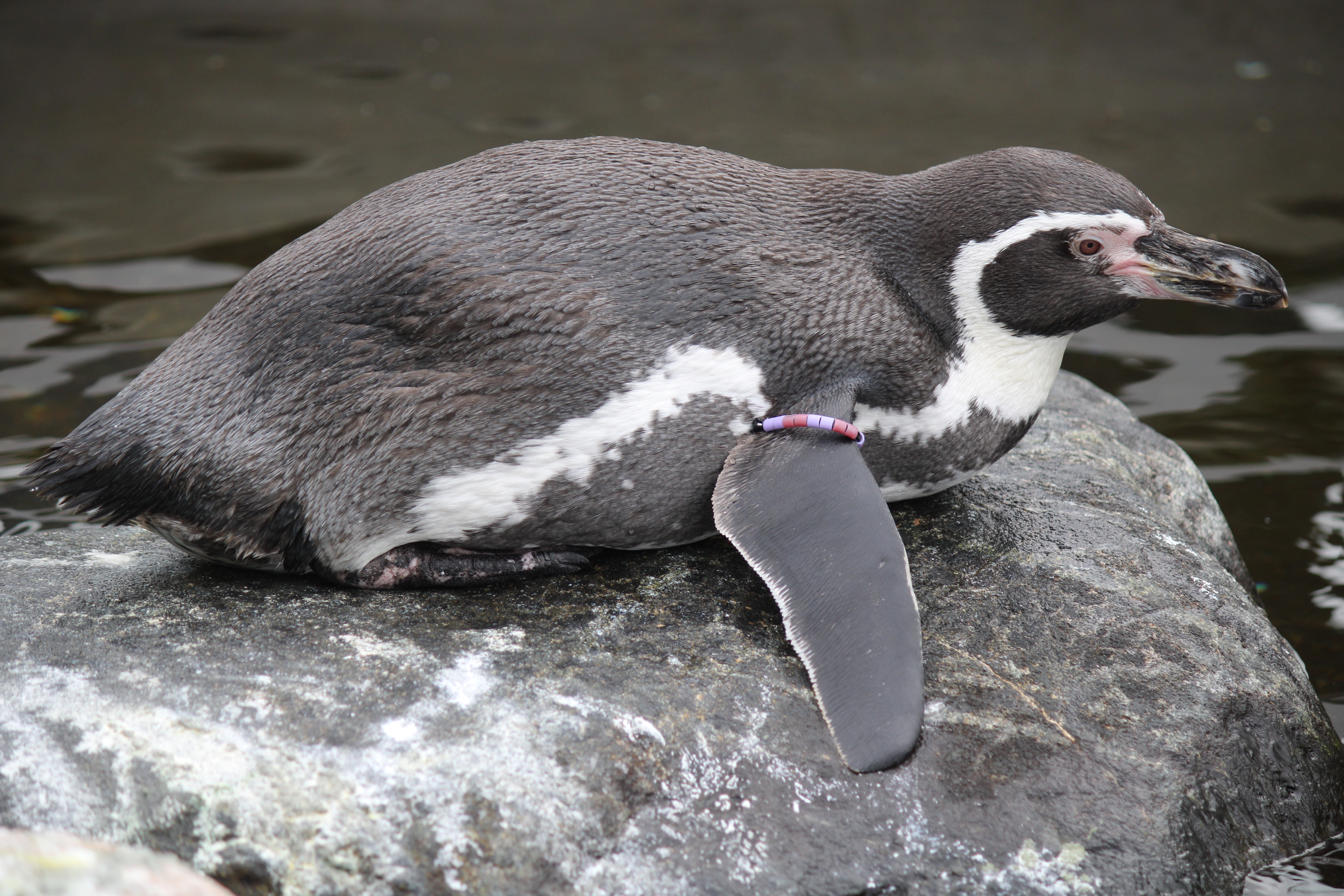
A ringed humboldt penguin at Copenhagen Zoo, Denmark

The organising body, by collating many such reports, can then determine patterns of bird movements for large populations. Non-ringing/banding scientists can also obtain data for use in bird-related research.

At times in North America, the bands have just a unique number (without an address) that is recorded along with other identifying information on the bird. If the bird is recaptured the number on the band is recorded (along with other identifying characteristics) as a retrap. All band numbers and information on the individual birds are then entered into a database and the information often shared throughout North American banding operations. This way information on retrapped birds is more readily available and easy to access.

== Equipment used ==
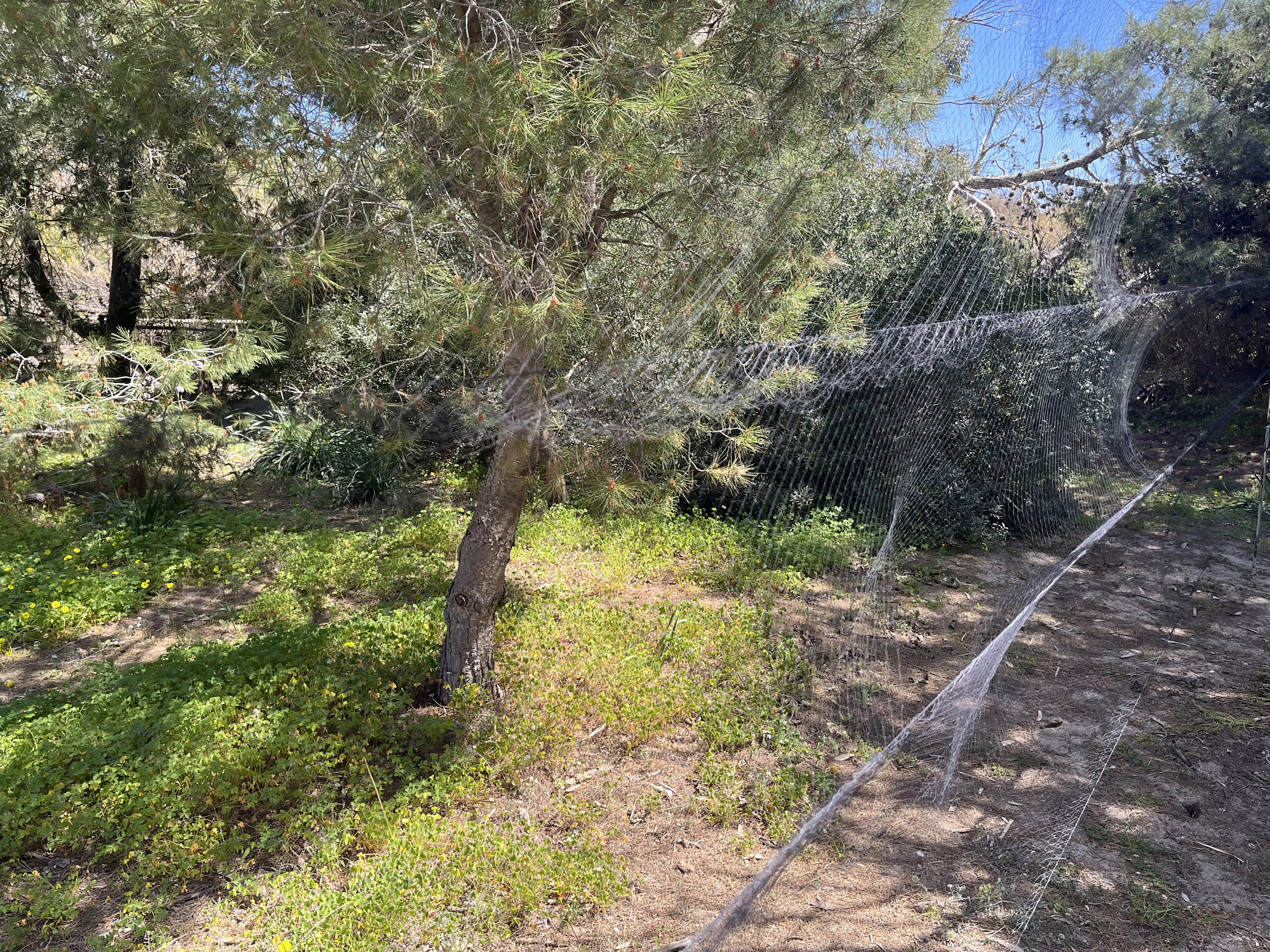
Mist nets used for capturing birds for ringing

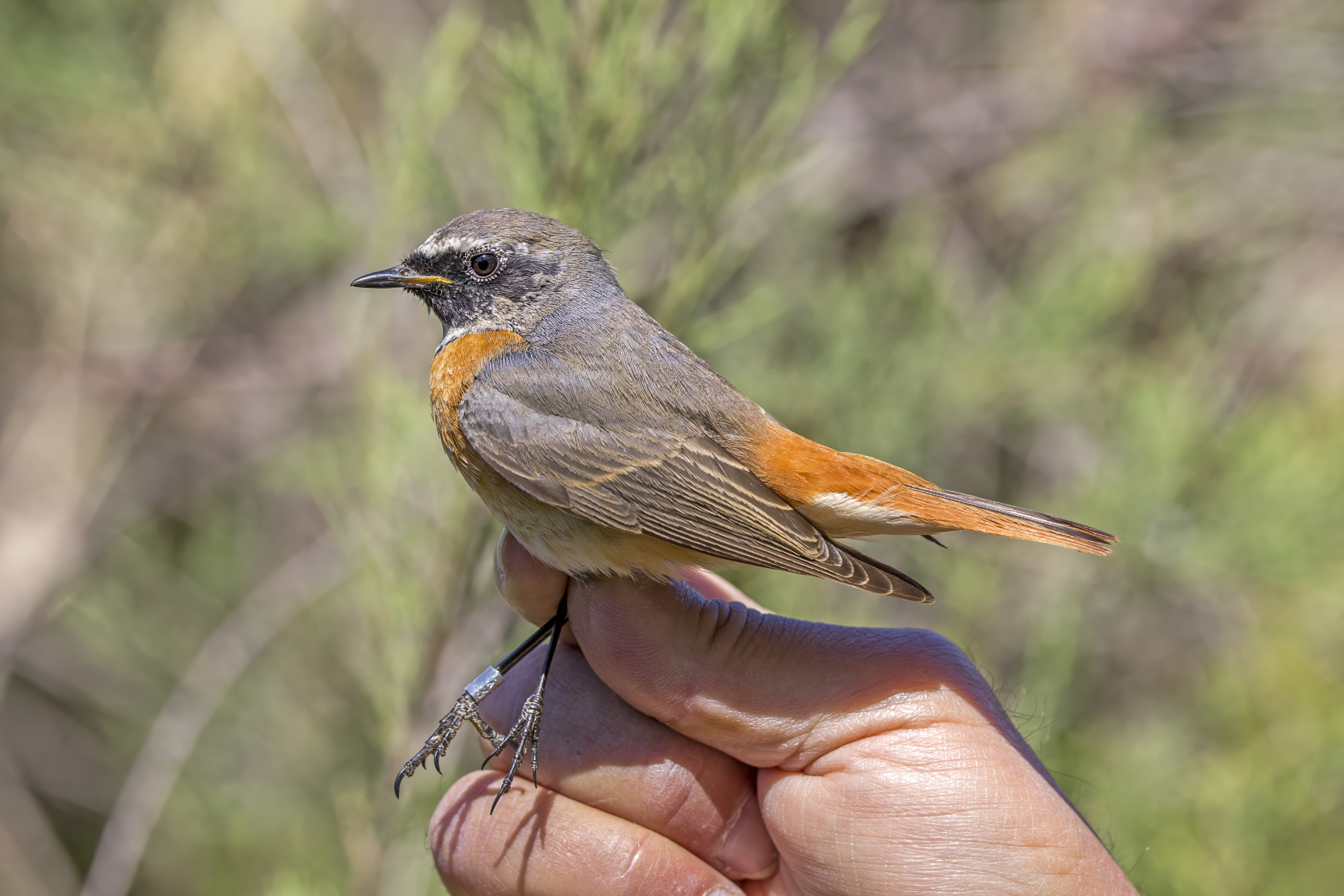
Male common redstart with a ring

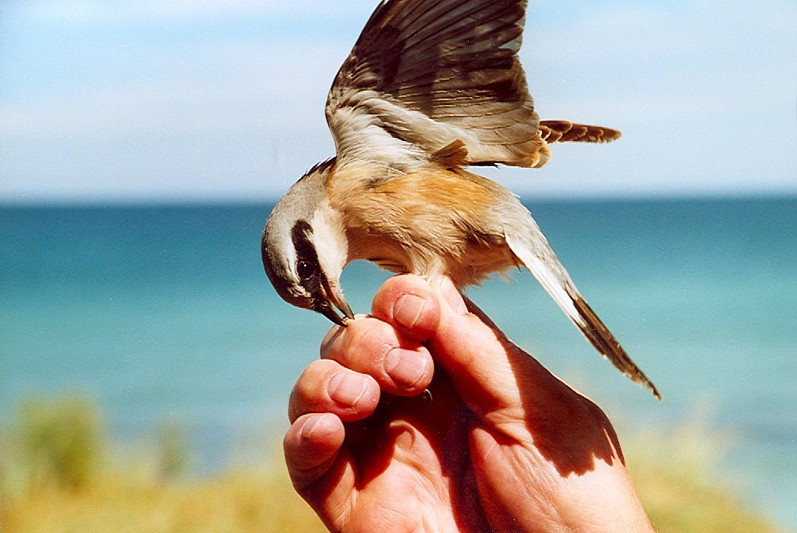
Bird ringing is not without hazards to the ringer; in this image, a red-backed shrike is attacking the person ringing it.

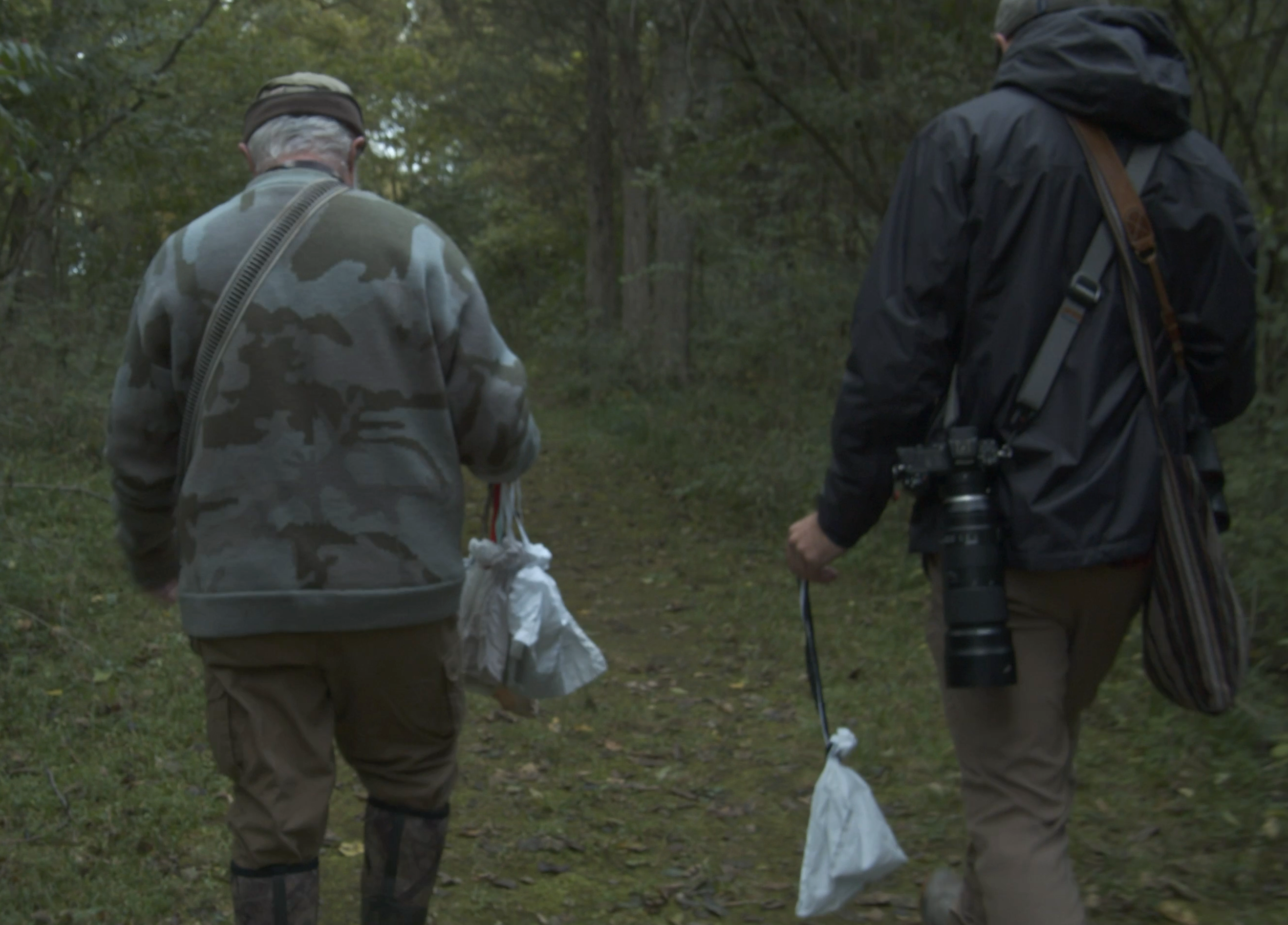
Holding bags used for transportation and holding of birds before banding

=== Mist nets ===
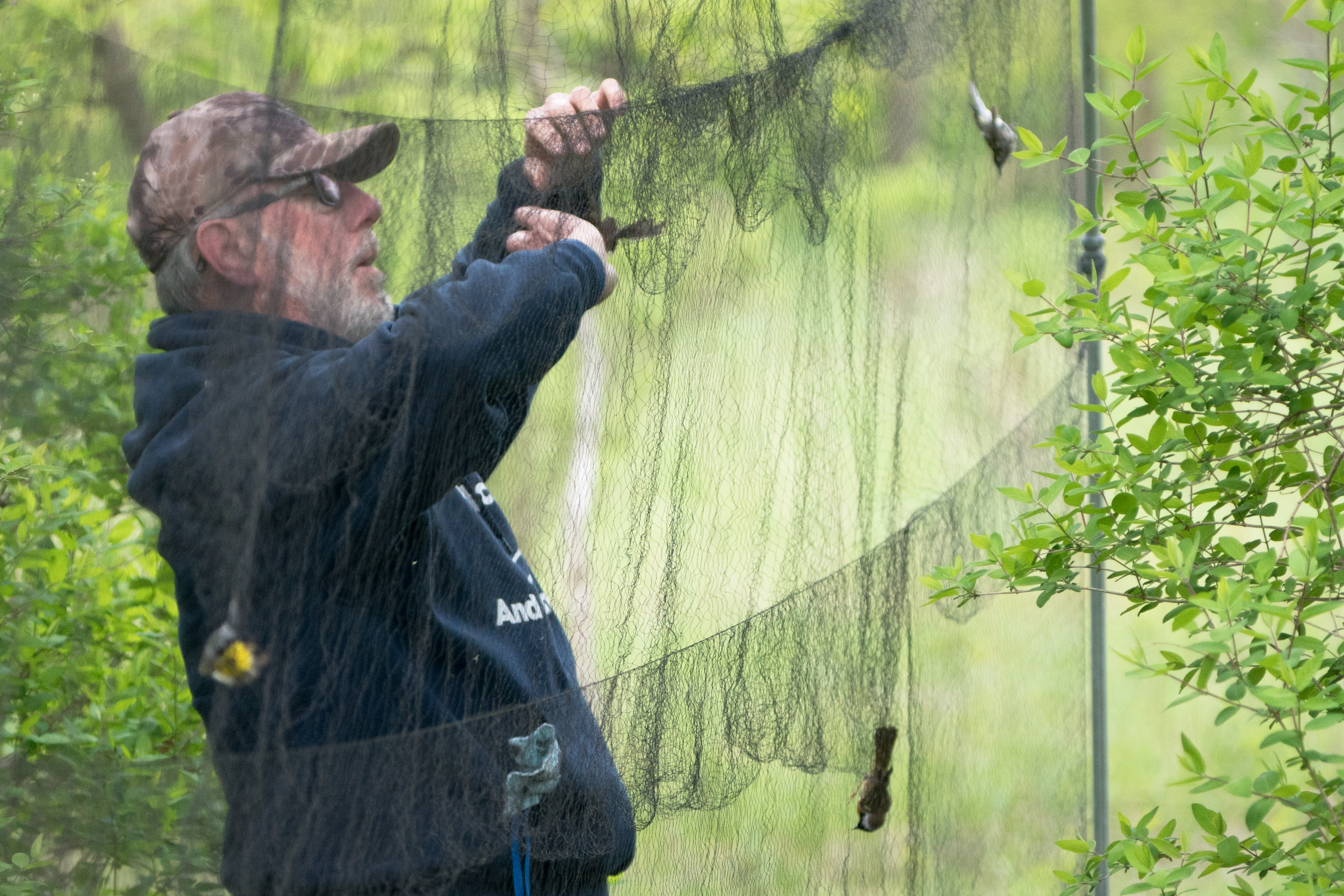
A researcher removes a bird from a mist net.

Mist nets are fine mesh nets with shelves that create pockets to temporarily restrain birds. Mist nets come in a variety of mesh sizes, heights, lengths, weights, materials, and colours. The mesh size of the net is calculated differently in different countries; in the US and Canada the given mesh size is equivalent to two sides of a mesh square, while in the UK it is equivalent to one side. Ringers must choose a mesh size that appropriately targets the desired species, with smaller birds requiring a smaller mesh size. Nets can range from 1.5 to 18 metres (4.9 to 59.1 ft) in length, and from 1 to 3 metres (3.3 to 9.8 ft) in height depending on the number of panels. The thread weight and ply (number of strands) can also vary. Common construction materials include nylon, polyester, and monofilament. Mist nets are typically black, but may also be shades of green or brown. While mist nets are capable of capturing a large variety of species, they require supervised training in order to use properly, and they must be checked frequently while they are deployed.

=== Ringing pliers ===
Ringing pliers are an essential tool that aid in placing the ring around a bird's leg. These pliers come in different sizes, determined by how wide a bird's leg is. Pliers are sized between 0A–1A, 2–3, and 3B, 3A, and 4.

=== Leg gauge ===
The ring size is determined by using a leg gauge. This is placed around the bird's leg, which determines the diameter of the leg. After identifying the size of ring needed, the ring is then placed around the leg using the ringing pliers. In Australia, ring sizes range from 1 to 15, plus special sizes for birds whose leg shapes require special rings, such as parrots and pelicans.

=== Wing rulers ===
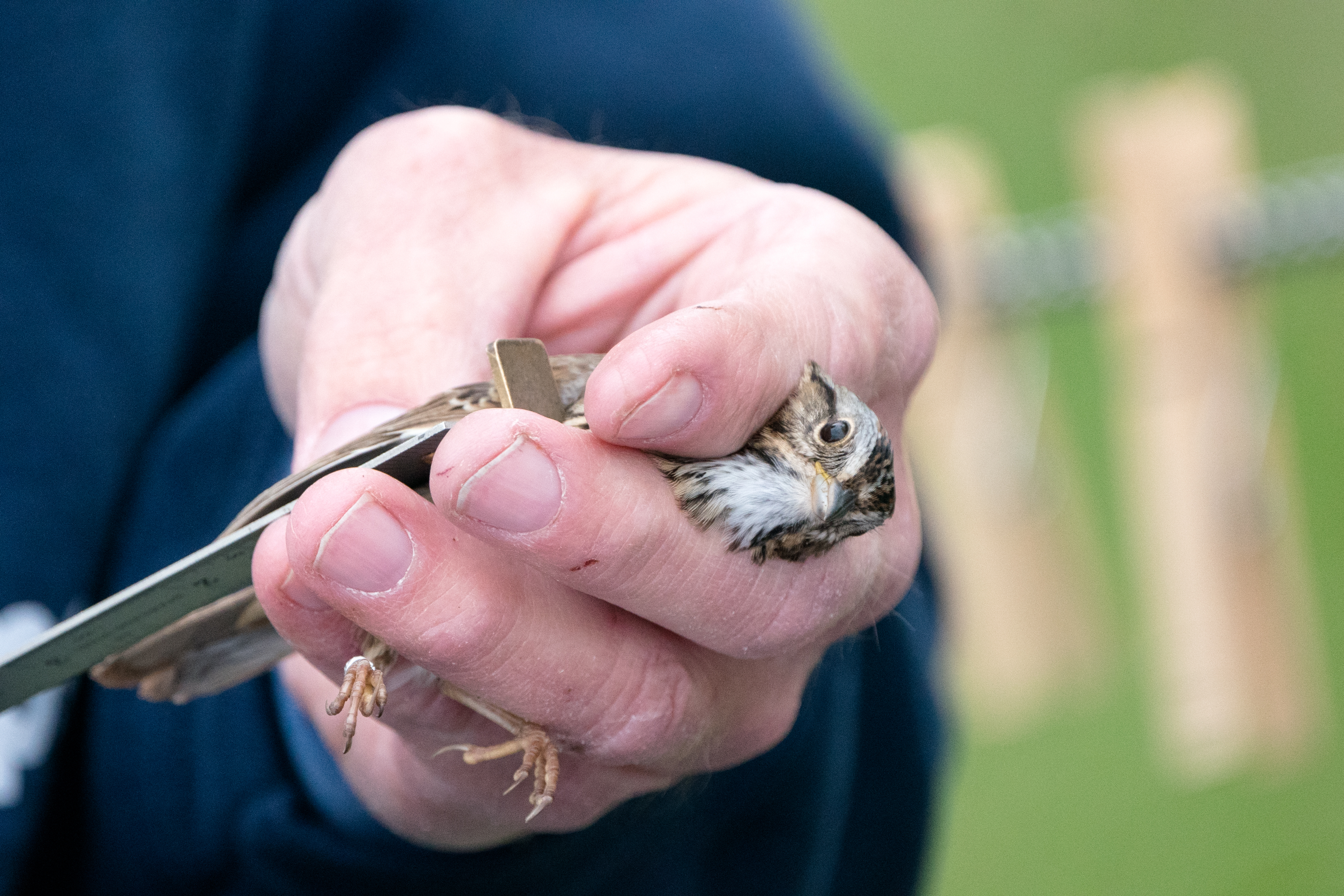
A researcher uses a wing ruler to measure the wing of a Lincoln's sparrow.

The next essential piece of equipment is the wing ruler, which is used to determine the length of the wing for data collection, research purposes, or species determination. Some birds can be identified by their wing chord.

=== Digital scales ===
Once the processing of the bird's morphology has been completed, the last piece of equipment used is a digital scale. This is used to determine the weight of the bird, and is the last step before releasing the bird.

== Limitations ==
Certain bird species are for various reasons unsuitable for ringing. In some countries, such as Australia, there exist laws prohibiting ringing of such species.

Some very large birds, such as ratites, are difficult to ring because the cost of making a ring which is capable of securely fitting their strong, heavy legs is prohibitive. At the other extreme, the smaller species of river and tree kingfishers, todies and certain lories, have such narrow tarsi that a ring placed around the bird's foot may impose danger to blood circulation. For some gamebirds, such as the Indian peafowl, spurs on the legs interfere with the rings, which thus can cause injury to the birds.

Special rings are needed for long-lived seabirds, such as Manx shearwaters, which can live for over 50 years. The corrosive effects of sea water, combined with wear, result in traditional aluminium rings only lasting around 4 years; for these birds, much tougher and more corrosion-resistant incoloy, monel, or stainless steel alloy rings are now used.

Many species of cockatoo, which even if able to be ringed, require special rings to fit the unique shape of their legs. With softer metals like aluminium, they can bite off the rings with their powerful bills; tougher alloys also need to be used for these rings. The ability to overcome this problem varies between species, and with some such as the Gang-gang cockatoo, it is known to be too dangerous to attempt banding. New World vultures also cannot be banded on their legs because they urinate onto their legs, causing corrosion of the bands into a powdery oxide that sticks to the vulture's leg and injures the bird. Dippers are also dangerously handicapped by ringing because the rings induce drag that makes it extremely difficult for them to catch prey in fast-flowing water.

Among species which can be safely ringed, there are major limitations among nomadic species of the deserts of the Eastern Hemisphere and cardueline finches of the taiga. The highly unpredictable movements inherent in these species' lifestyles means that recovery rates are extremely low, especially given generally low population densities within their habitats.

== Side effects ==
Some bird species may be affected by the bands, with certain colors or materials increasing or decreasing their attractiveness to potential mates when compared to unbanded individuals. Even if mate preference is unaffected, the presence of artificial bands may change the behavior of the banded birds; for example, banded bluethroat males spent less time guarding their mates than unbanded males, spending more time singing, performing, and intruding into neighbors' territories.

== Similar schemes ==
=== Neck rings ===
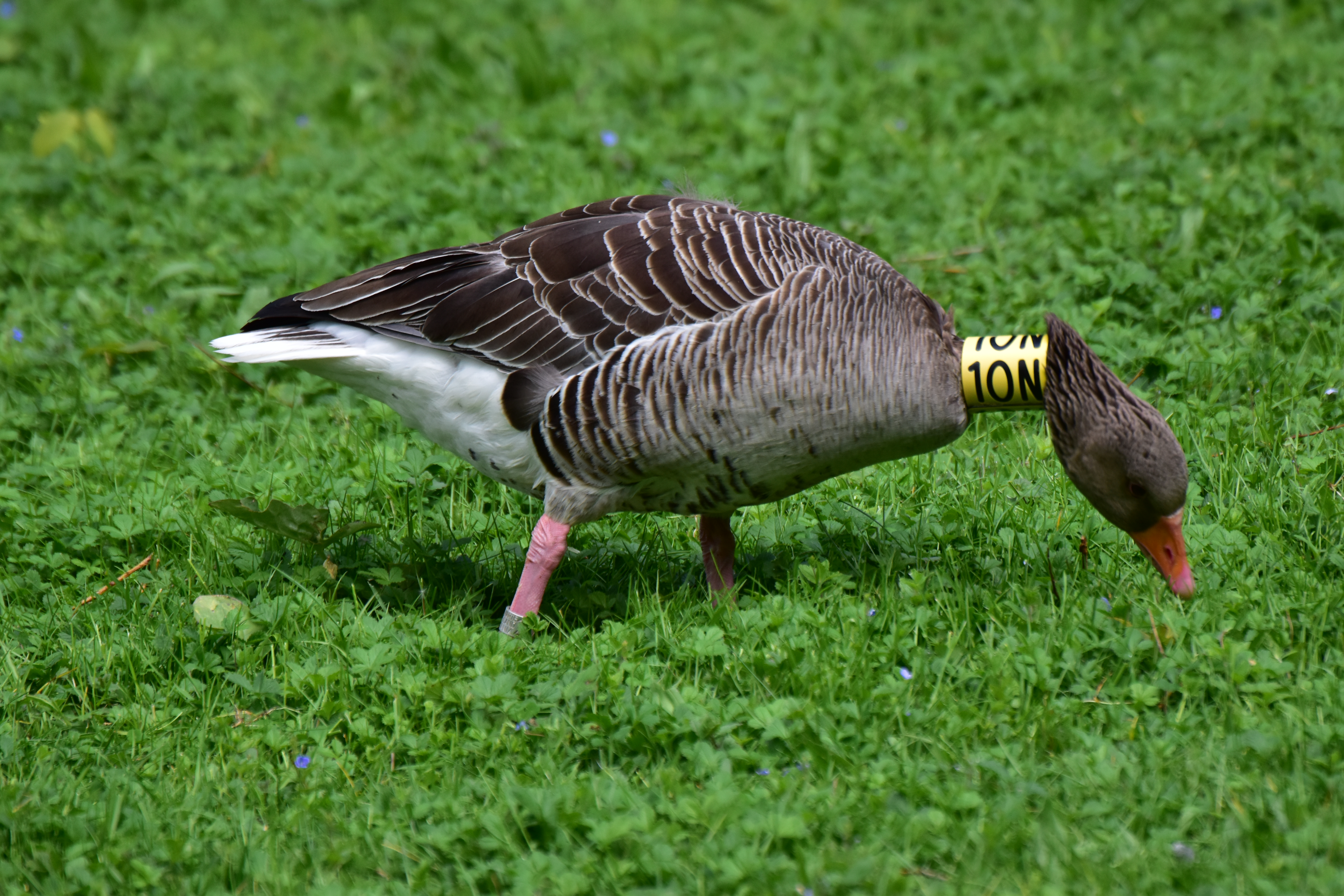
A greylag goose with a neck collar ring. These can be read at long distance, increasing observation rates.

Most waterfowl are leg ringed, but some are marked with a plastic neck collar, which can be read at a greater distance. Neck collars can also be used for other long-necked birds such as flamingos.

=== Wing tags ===
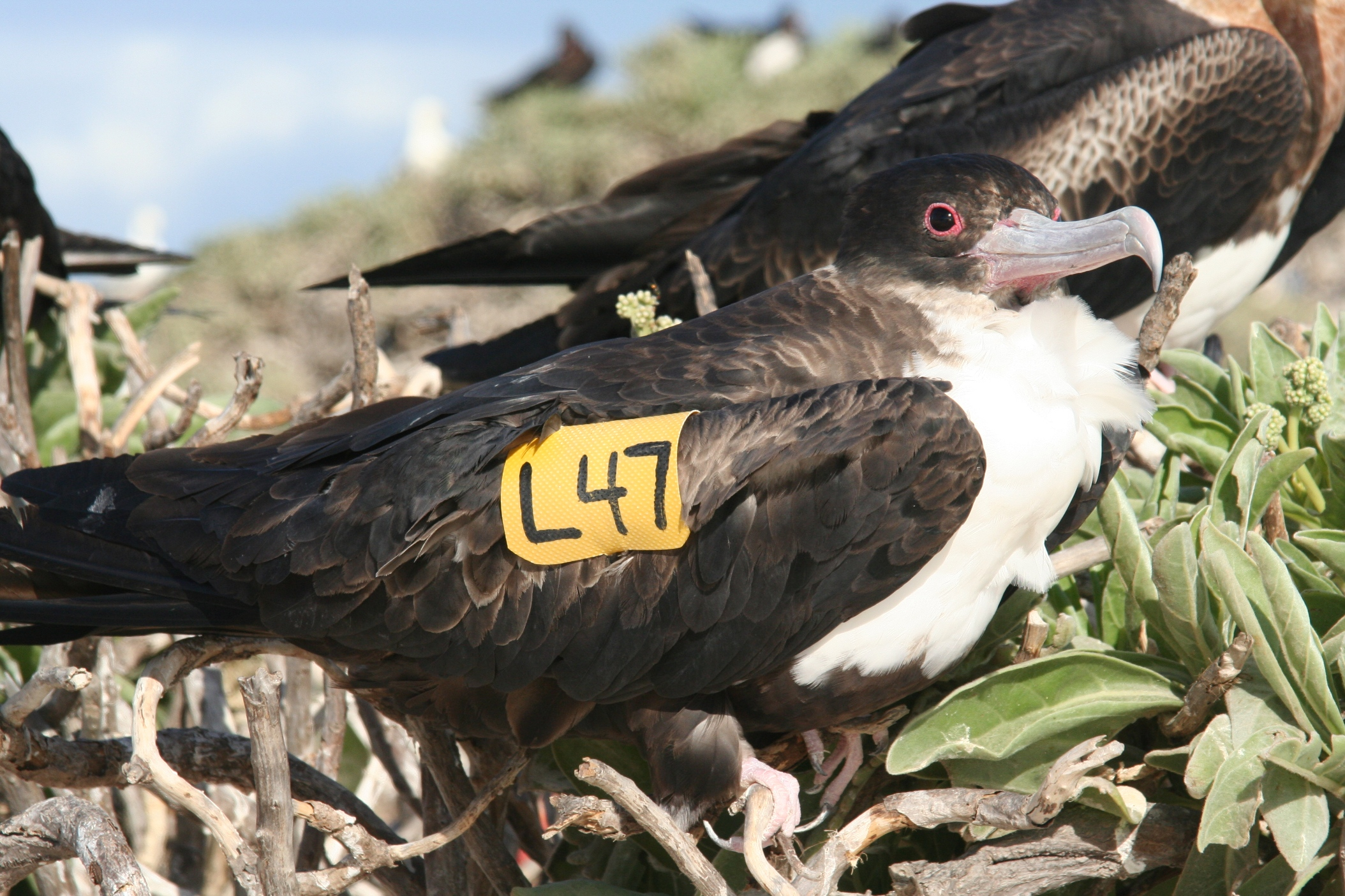
This female great frigatebird has been tagged with wing tags as part of a breeding study.

In some surveys, involving larger birds such as eagles, brightly coloured plastic tags are attached to birds' wing feathers. Each has a letter or letters, and the combination of colour and letters uniquely identifies the bird. These can then be read in the field, through binoculars, meaning that there is no need to re-trap the birds. Because the tags are attached to feathers, they drop off when the bird moults.

Another method is imping in a brightly coloured false feather instead of a natural feather.

A patagial tag is a permanent tag held onto the wing by a rivet punched through the patagium.

Wing tags can be a problem for some smaller raptors like harriers as their conspicuous nature makes them more obvious targets for other more powerful predators like peregrine falcons.

=== Radio transmitters and satellite-tracking ===
Where detailed information is needed on individual movements, tiny radio transmitters can be fitted on to birds. For small species the transmitter is carried as a 'backpack' fitted over the wing bases, and for larger species it may be attached to a tail feather or looped to the legs. Both types usually have a tiny (10 cm) flexible aerial to improve signal reception. Two field receivers (reading distance and direction) are needed to establish the bird's position using triangulation from the ground. The technique is useful for tracing individuals during landscape-level movements particularly in dense vegetation (such as tropical forests) and for shy or difficult-to-spot species, because birds can be located from a distance without visual confirmation.

The use of satellite transmitters for bird movements is currently restricted by transmitter size – to species larger than about 400g. They may be attached to migratory birds (geese, swans, cranes, penguins etc.) or other species such as penguins that undertake long-distance movements. Individuals may be tracked by satellites for immense distances, for the lifetime of the transmitter battery. As with wing tags, the transmitters may be designed to drop off when the bird moults; or they may be recovered by recapturing the bird.

Motus wildlife tracking network is a program of Birds Canada, it was launched in 2014 in the US and Canada, by 2022 more than 1,500 receiver stations have been installed in 34 countries, most receivers are concentrated in the United States and Canada.

=== Field-readable rings ===
A field-readable is a ring or rings, usually made from plastic and brightly coloured, which may also have conspicuous markings in the form of letters and/or numbers. They are used by biologists working in the field to identify individual birds without recapture and with a minimum of disturbance to their behaviour. Rings large enough to carry numbers are usually restricted to larger birds, although if necessary small extensions to the rings (leg flags) bearing the identification code allow their use on slightly smaller species. For small species (e.g. most passerines), individuals can be identified by using a combination of small rings of different colours, which are read in a specific order. Most colour-marks of this type are considered temporary (the rings degrade, fade and may be lost or removed by the birds) and individuals are usually also fitted with a permanent metal ring.

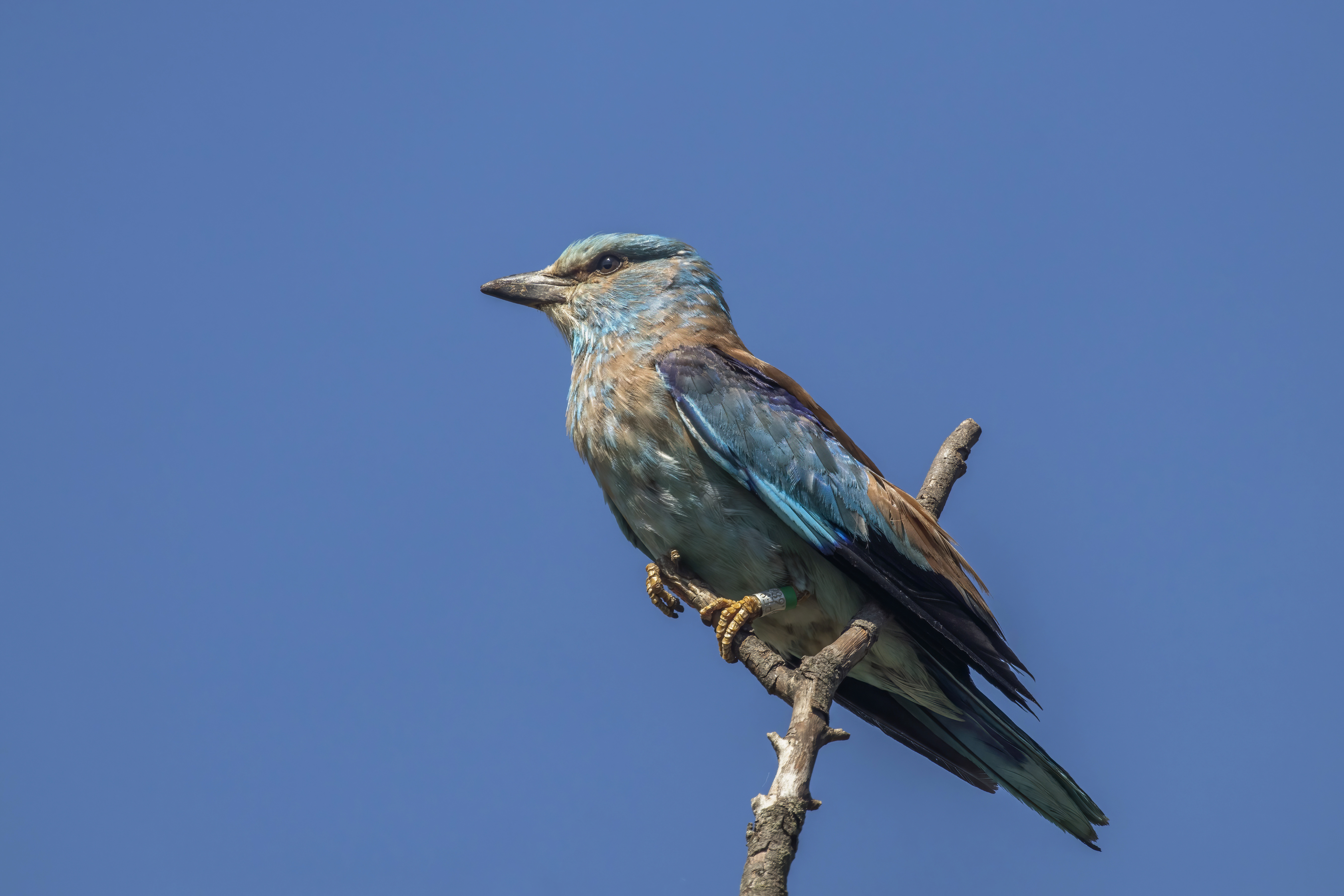
Ringed for the European roller conservation project

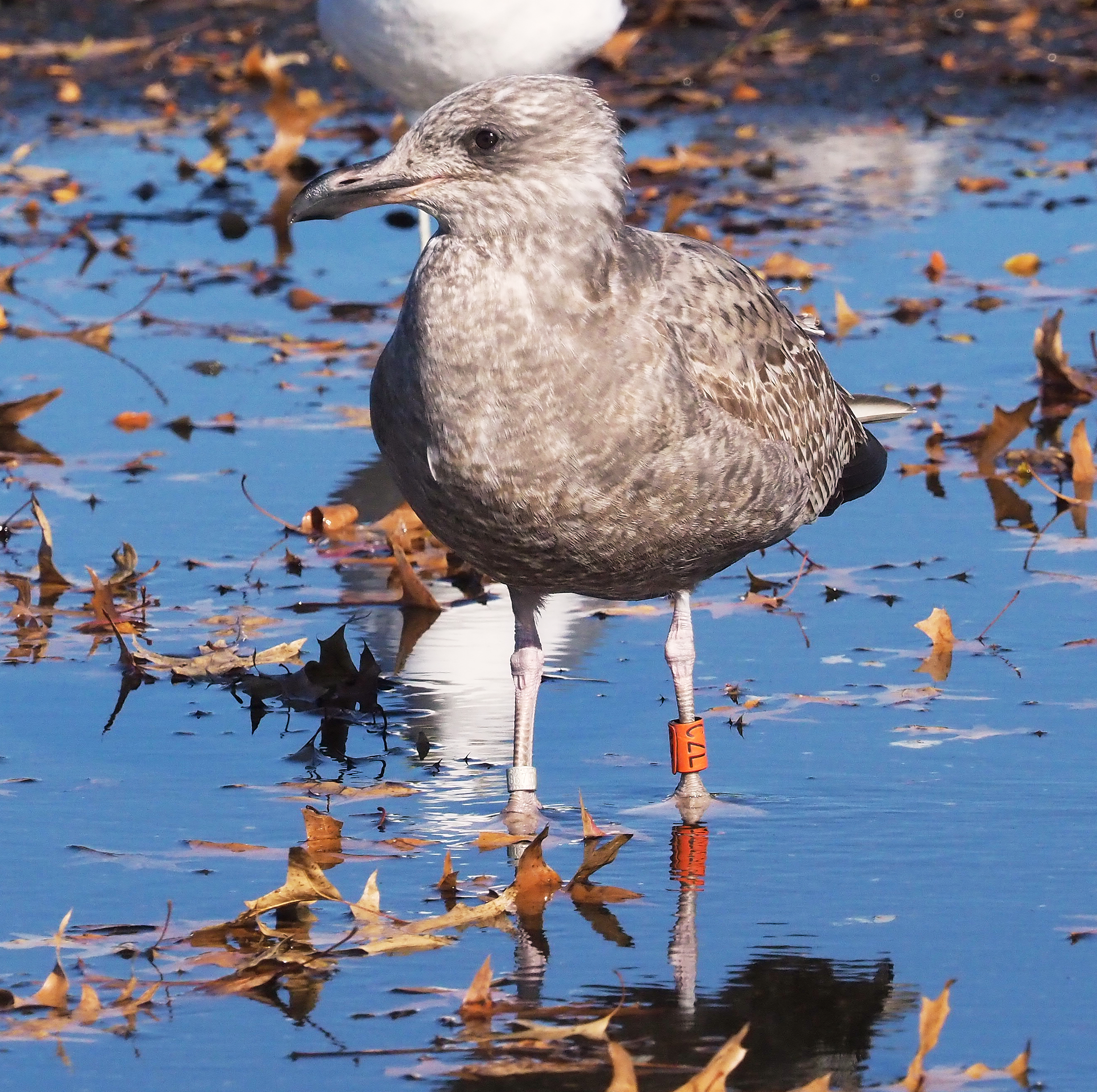
A gull with rings on both legs.
The orange ring is alphanumeric; the large characters makes it easy to read from a distance.

=== Leg-flags ===
Similar to coloured rings or bands are leg-flags, usually made of darvic and used in addition to numbered metal rings. Although leg-flags may sometimes have individual codes on them, their more usual use is to code for the sites where the birds were ringed in order to elucidate their migration routes and staging areas. The use of colour-coded leg-flags is part of an international program, originated in Australia in 1990, by the countries of the East Asian–Australasian Flyway to identify important areas and routes used by migratory waders.

=== Other markers ===
Head and neck markers are very visible, and may be used in species where the legs are not normally visible (such as ducks and geese). Nasal discs and nasal saddles can be attached to the culmen with a pin looped through the nostrils in birds with perforate nostrils. They should not be used if they obstruct breathing. They should not be used on birds that live in icy climates, as accumulation of ice on a nasal saddle can plug the nostrils. Neck collars made of expandable, non-heat-conducting plastic are useful for larger birds such as geese.

== Education ==
Many institutions that ring birds offer demonstrations for the public, where experts ring live birds while highlighting the steps of the process and answering questions from the public. Educating visitors about the technique helps to spread accurate information about it to the public. While live bird ringing is not the only method of educating the public on bird conservation, it gives visitors a chance to observe the process directly.

== Regulation ==
Ringing activities are often regulated by national agencies but because ringed birds may be found across countries, there are consortiums that ensure that recoveries and reports are collated. In the UK, bird ringing is organised by the British Trust for Ornithology. In North America the U.S. Bird Banding Laboratory collaborates with Canadian programs and since 1996, partners with the North American Banding Council (NABC). Waterfowl hunters may report the ring number of the bird they killed or observed, and find out the details of that specific bird such as breed, age, and ringing location. Bird rings are often seen as a prize because they are still relatively rare. The European Union for Bird Ringing (EURING) consolidates ringing data from the various national programs in Europe. In Australia, the Australian Bird and Bat Banding Scheme manages all bird and bat ringing information. while SAFRING manages bird ringing activities in South Africa. Bird ringing in India is managed by the Bombay Natural History Society. BirdRing rings in the Neotropics and Africa. The National Center for Bird Conservation (CEMAVE) coordinates a national scheme for bird ringing in Brazil.

== See also ==
- Tracking animal migration
