= Ingleses do Rio Vermelho =

Neighborhood in Florianópolis, Brazil

Coordinates: 27°27′S 48°22′W

Ingleses do Rio Vermelho is a neighborhood of Florianópolis located in the northeast of the island of Santa Catarina, Brazil. It is located between the districts of Cachoeira do Bom Jesus and São João do Rio Vermelho and was founded by decree in 1831. The origin of its name is attributed to the sinking of an English ship, occurring in the mid-eighteenth century, when some crew members opted to reside in the region.

It has an area of 20.47 square kilometers (7.90 sq mi) and its population in 2000 was 16,514 inhabitants.

Located 56 km (35 miles) from downtown, the Ingleses Beach has the largest resident population. Large investments were made in recent years, providing the resort with tourist infrastructure including hotels, guesthouses, bars and restaurants, allowing it to receive tourists in any season.

Much of the local population is from other cities and states, and Azorean culture is not as prominent today as in other parts of the island. Throughout the year, various religious festivals are held. The primary economic activity is related to trade, construction, and especially tourism. Fishing, which for many years was the main livelihood of the population, is still an industry throughout the year.
