= Barra da Lagoa =

- District
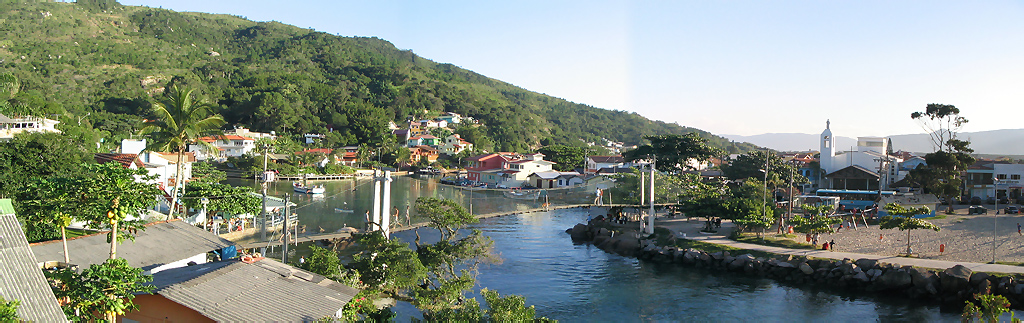

- Barra da Lagoa in Brazil
- Coordinates: 27°34′41″S 48°25′48″W
- Country: Brazil
- State: Santa Catarina
- City: Florianópolis

Population (2000)
  - Total: 4,331
- Time zone: UTC−03:00 (Brasília time)
  - Summer (DST): UTC−02:00 (Brasília summer time)

Barra da Lagoa is a small fishing village in the city of Florianópolis, Santa Catarina, Brazil. The village is set on the mouth of a tidewater channel that flows in and out of the Island's sizable lagoon, the Lagoa da Conceição. The channel is at the end of a long beach made up of Praia Barra da Lagoa (English:Barra da Lagoa Beach) and Mozambique Beach which form a single 14 km stretch of beach. Another beaches near Barra da Lagoa are Prainha da Barra, Praia de Galheta and Mole Beach.

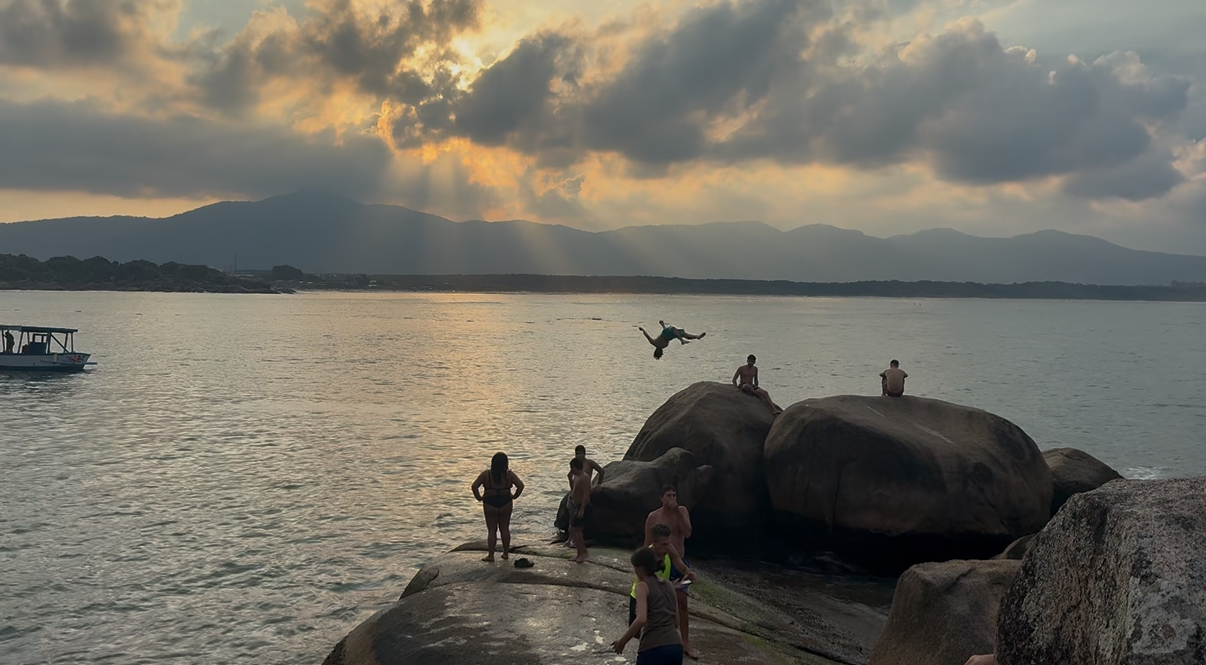
Cliff jumping in Barra da Lagoa

Barra da Lagoa is home to a turtle preservation centre operated by Projeto TAMAR.
