= Canasvieiras =

Neighborhood in Florianópolis, Brazil

Coordinates: 27°26′24″S 48°27′53″W

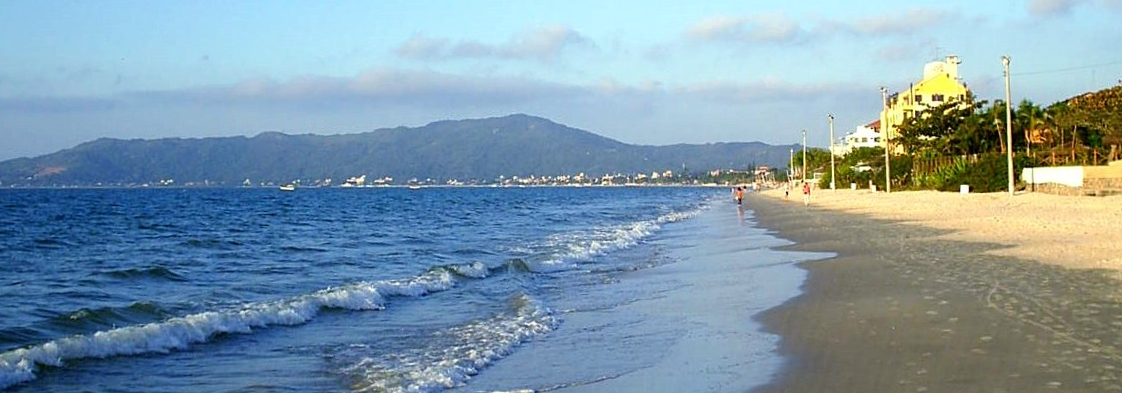
Canasvieiras

Canasvieiras is a neighbourhood and beach located in southern Brazil, approximately 27 kilometres (17 mi) north-east of the city of Florianópolis on the northern part of Santa Catarina Island. Nearby beaches include Jurerê and Cachoeira do Bom Jesus. The population is 10,129, and the area is 29.0 km² (11.1 square miles).

The area has accommodation, bathhouses and shops (many of which have bilingual attendants), a police station and a health clinic.
