= Cemave =

Brazilian institution for bird conservation

The National Center for Bird Conservation, or CEMAVE, is a Brazilian institution, which is a decentralized unit of the Chico Mendes Institute for Biodiversity Conservation (Instituto Chico Mendes de Conservação da Biodiversidade) involved in the conservation of wild birds.

== History ==
The CEMAVE was created in 1977 under the name of Center for Bird Migration, based on the Brazilian commitment to attend the Convention for the protection of flora, fauna and scenic natural beauty of the countries of America. At that time, its main objective was to conduct studies for conservation of species of migratory birds and knowledge of their migratory routes, and to organize and coordinate the Brazilian bird banding system. Since 1980, the CEMAVE began to develop scientific research to better understand the basic biological aspects of wild birds to their conservation.
