= Lagoa da Conceição =

- District
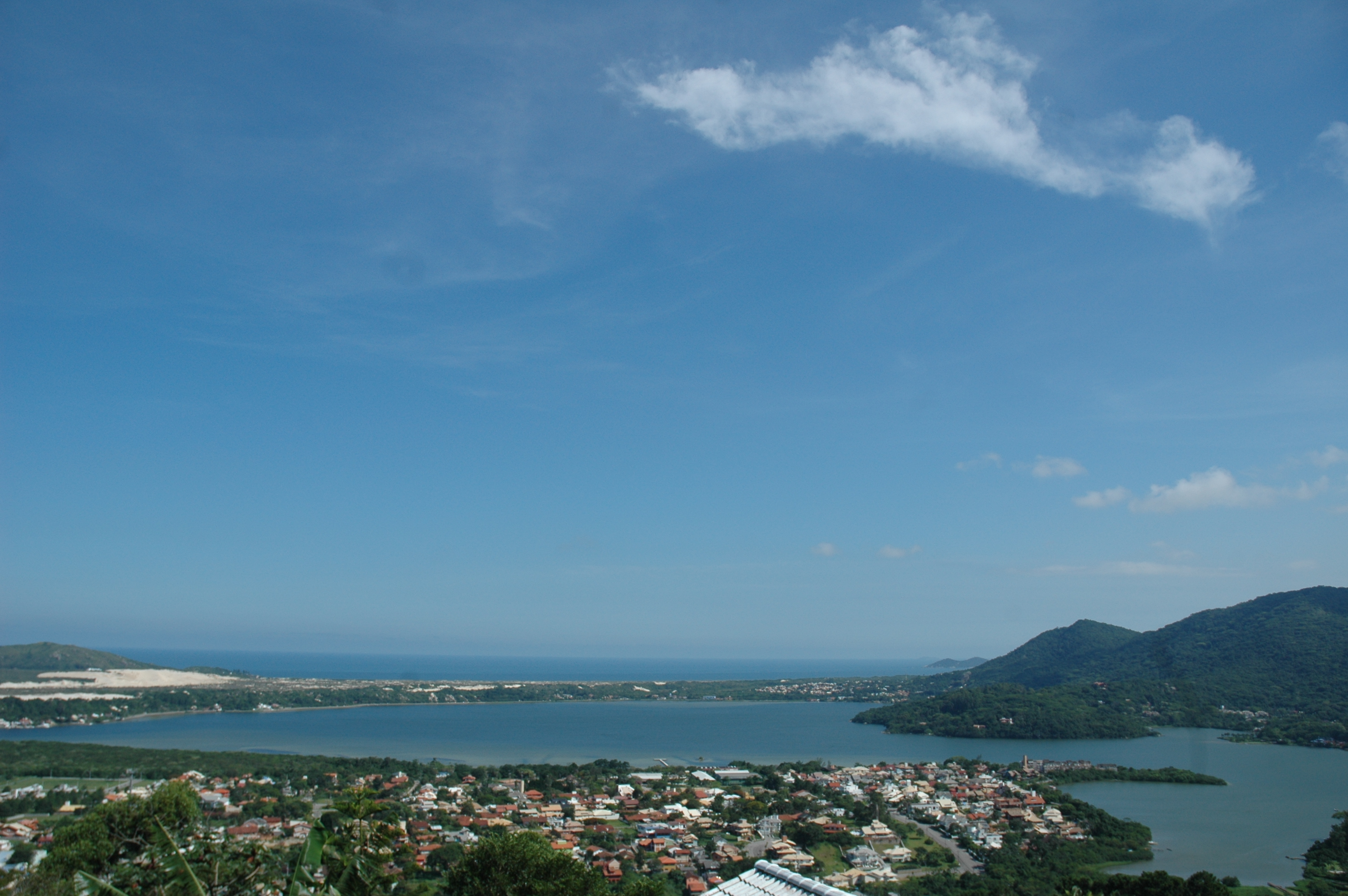

- Lagoa da Conceição
- Coordinates: 27°33′S 48°27′W
- Country: Brazil
- State: Santa Catarina
- City: Florianópolis

Population (2022)
  - Total: 13,606
- Time zone: UTC−03:00 (Brasília time)
  - Summer (DST): UTC−02:00 (Brasília summer time)

Lagoa da Conceição (Portuguese: [laˈɡoɐ dɐ kõsejˈsɐ̃w]) is a district located next to a large lagoon of the same name near the center of Florianópolis, capital city of the state of Santa Catarina, located in the south of Brazil.

Lagoa da Conceição combines beaches, dunes, hills, and the biggest lagoon on the island. The area has a small town center with a medical clinic, post office, pharmacies, supermarkets, boutique stores and specialty shops. The town gets particularly crowded during the Brazilian summer vacation, i.e. the months of January and February.

== Culture ==
Many expats and Brazilian people from other cities choose to live by the lagoon because of its views, safety, nature and quality of life. The town has several vegetarian restaurants, organic food, gyms and spas.

The Holy Spirit Feast (Festa do Divino) is a festival that takes place 40 days after Easter. The celebration dates to the colonial era and includes a parade, music, and street food.

== Markets ==
Every Saturday and Sunday there is a market on the main square in front of the little bridge with art crafts, vintage items, vinyl discs, organic food, and local honey.

On Sundays there is the Feirate, or Art Fair in the Bento Silveiro square, with over 80 craftsmen. Anything, from educational wooden toys to tapestries may be found here.

== Sports ==
With a water temperature that averages 27 °C during summer, shallow water and an absence of waves make the lake a calm place for kids and family groups. Halfway down Rendeiras Avenue, on the edge of the lagoon there are two sand courts for playing volleyball and foot volleyball.

There are also boat rides from the end of Rendeiras Avenue. It is also possible to rent kayaks and pedal boats there, as well as take windsurfing, kite surfing, and canoeing lessons.

== Tourism ==
There are several establishments, mostly bed-and-breakfast hotels and hostels. The Lagoon put Florianópolis among the top destinations for backpackers and foreign travelers in South America.

The variety of bars makes Lagoa nightlife the most popular destination in Florianópolis. Some of the finest restaurants in town are located in Lagoa. The menus vary from local seafood to pizza, through Chinese, Japanese, Mexican, Old Azorean cuisine and sandwiches. The food truck parking lot is a meeting point for hipster from all over the world. There are also places with live music, alternative bands, nightclubs, bars with dance floors or open air bars. In high season the increase in population results in traffic jams from the Lagoa hill to the end of Rendeiras Avenue.

The Lagoa da Conceição district also includes beaches, including Praia Mole and Joaquina, both of which have hosted international professional surf tour events. Windsurfing, sailing, kayaking, kite surfing and jetskiing are common activities on the lake and at the adjacent beaches there are always surfers in the water regardless of the temperature. The dunes between Lagoa da Conceição and Joaquina are where sandboarding was born. The hills around the lagoon are also used as a lift off for hangliders and paragliders. There are also several trails for ecological hikes and biking.
