= Santa Catarina Island =

Island in Santa Catarina, Brazil

Native name: Ilha de Santa Catarina Nickname: Ilha da Magia
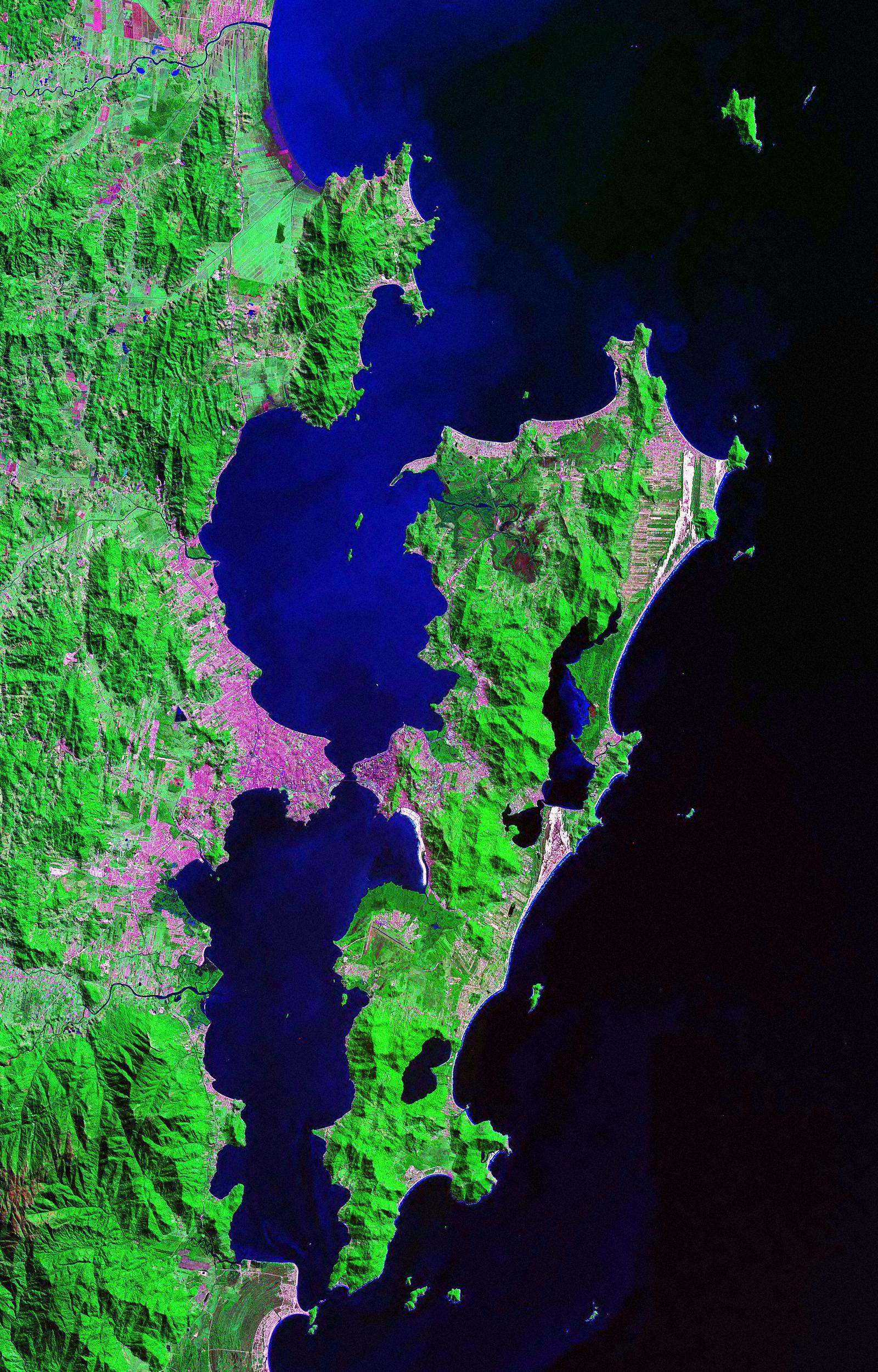

- Location within Brazil

Geography
- Coordinates: 27°36′S 48°30′W
- Area: 424.4 km^{2} (163.9 sq mi)

Administration
- Brazil
- State: Santa Catarina

Demographics
- Population: 421,203 (2010)
- Pop. density: 602.29/km^{2} (1559.92/sq mi)

Santa Catarina Island (Portuguese: Ilha de Santa Catarina) is an island in the Brazilian state of Santa Catarina, located off the southern coast. It is home to the state capital, Florianópolis.

== Location ==
Santa Catarina Island is approximately 54 km (33 mi) long (measuring north–south) by 18 km (11 mi) wide, measuring east–west at its widest point (in the north of the island), with a total area of 424.4 km^{2} (163.9 mi^{2}). The island is the largest of an archipelago of more than 30 islands, the majority of which lies within the Florianópolis municipality. Nearby islands are also part of the archipelago, which belong to other cities, including: Anhatomirim Island, Cabras Island, Arvoredo Island, Deserta Island, and Galés Island.

The three main bridges, Hercílio Luz Bridge (which was closed in 1991, and reopened in December 2019), Colombo Salles Bridge, and Pedro Ivo Campos Bridge, span a 500-meter wide and 28-meter deep channel that delimits the north and south bays of the island. One of the continental neighborhoods in Florianópolis is named after this strait.

== Urban areas ==
Santa Catarina Island is home to the state capital, Florianópolis, and is connected to the mainland by three bridges. The island also contains numerous beach resorts, including: Jurerê Internacional, Santinho, Canasvieiras and Cachoeira do Bom Jesus.

A large part of the city of Florianópolis lies within the borders of the island. The downtown area lies in the mid-west, but many other neighborhoods and districts are spread over the island. One notable neighborhood is Trindade, where the Federal University of Santa Catarina (UFSC) is located. In the north, the communities of Ingleses, Canasvieiras and Jurerê can be found, and those of Vargem Grande and Vargem Pequena are in the far north. The neighborhoods Santo Antônio de Lisboa, Cacupé, Sambaqui, Barra do Sambaqui, Rio Vermelho and Praia da Daniela are located in the northwest. To the south lie Pântano do Sul, Costa de Dentro, Caieira da Barra do Sul and Ribeirão da Ilha, though Costa de Cima is in the mid-south. Morro das Pedras and Armação do Pântano do Sul lie in the southeast. The east contains the communities Barra da Lagoa, Lagoa da Conceição, Rio Tavares and Campeche. Other neighborhoods on the island include Carvoeira, Córrego Grande, Itacorubi, Pantanal, Parque São Jorge, and Santa Mônica.

== Conservation ==
The Carijós Ecological Station was established by decree of 20 July 1987, covering an area of 7.5933 square kilometres (2.9318 sq mi) in the municipality. It preserves a significant area of mangroves on the Ilha de Santa Catarina. The Pirajubaé Marine Extractive Reserve in the south bay of the Ilha de Santa Catarina protects people engaged in traditional harvesting of marine resources, mainly shellfish, from the sandbanks of the bay. The tip of the island is in the 84,130 hectares (207,900 acres) Serra do Tabuleiro State Park, a protected area created in 1975. The 1,532 hectares (3,790 acres) Rio Vermelho State Park, created in 2007, is in the northeast of the island.

== Tourism ==
Places to visit include: Joaquim National Park, Serra do Rio do Rastro, surfing at Joaquina, Lagoinha do Leste, and Florianópolis city.
