= Rio de Janeiro =

Second-largest city in Brazil

- Municipality
- Municipality of Rio de Janeiro; Município do Rio de Janeiro
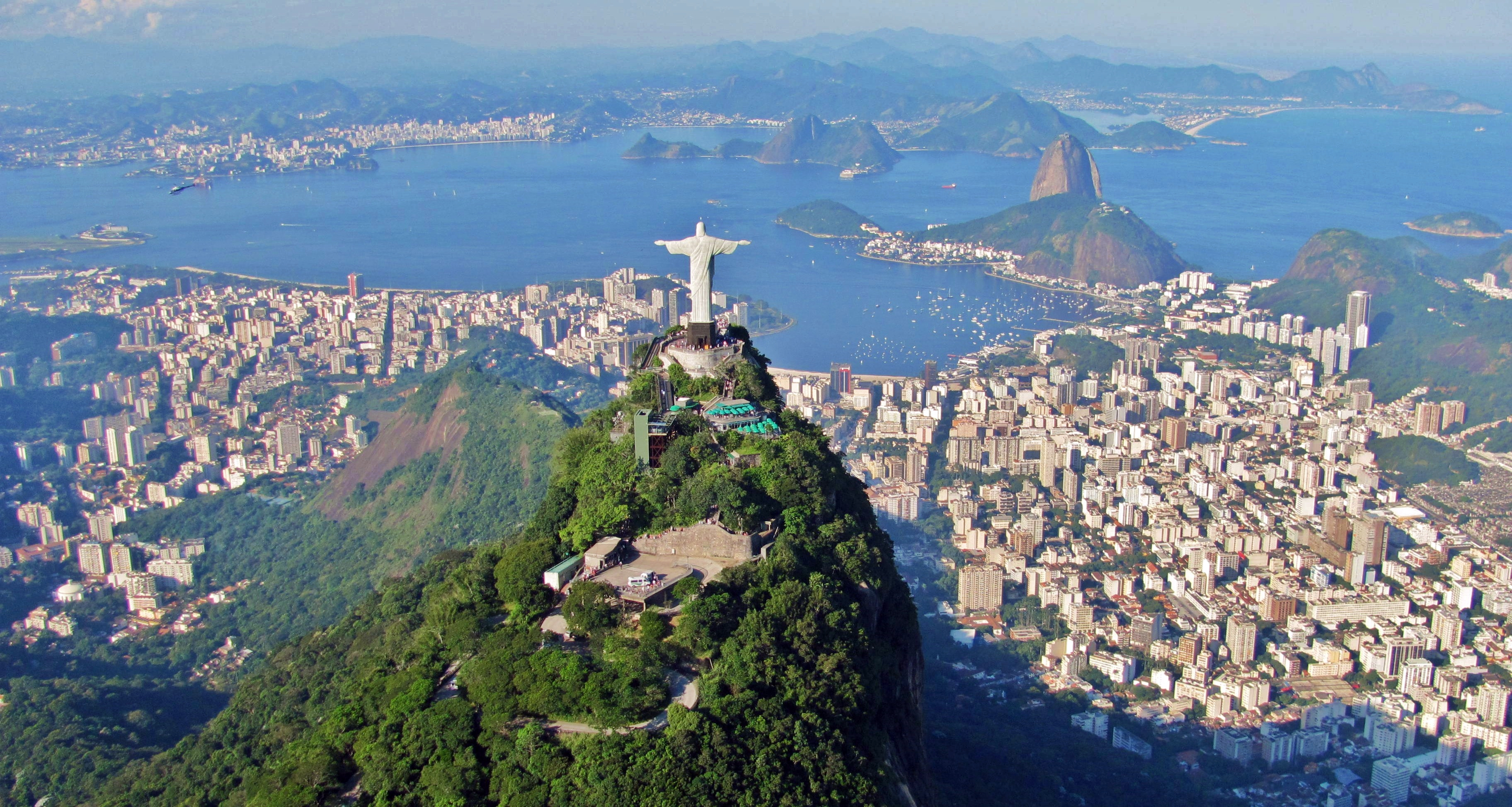
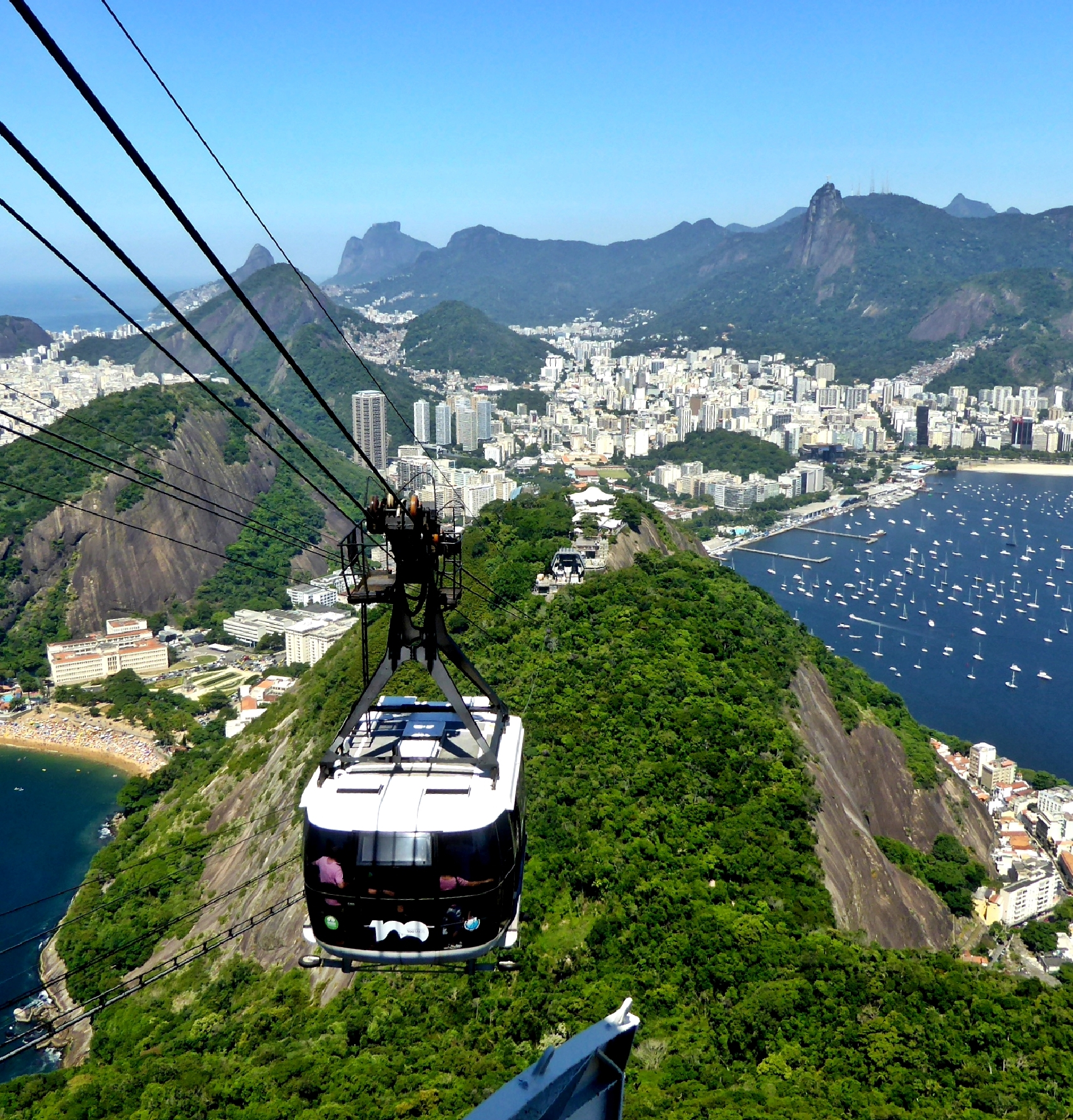
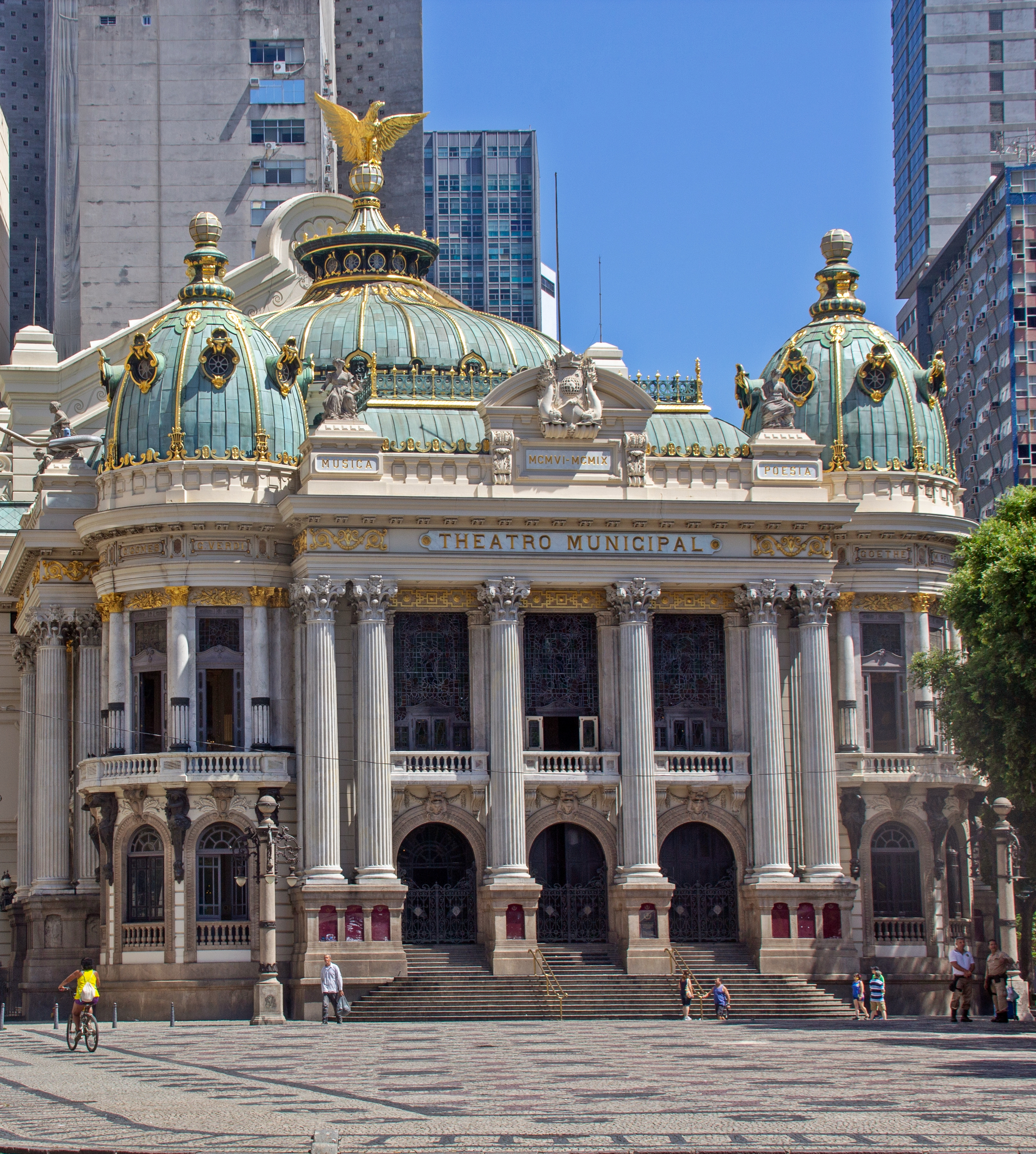
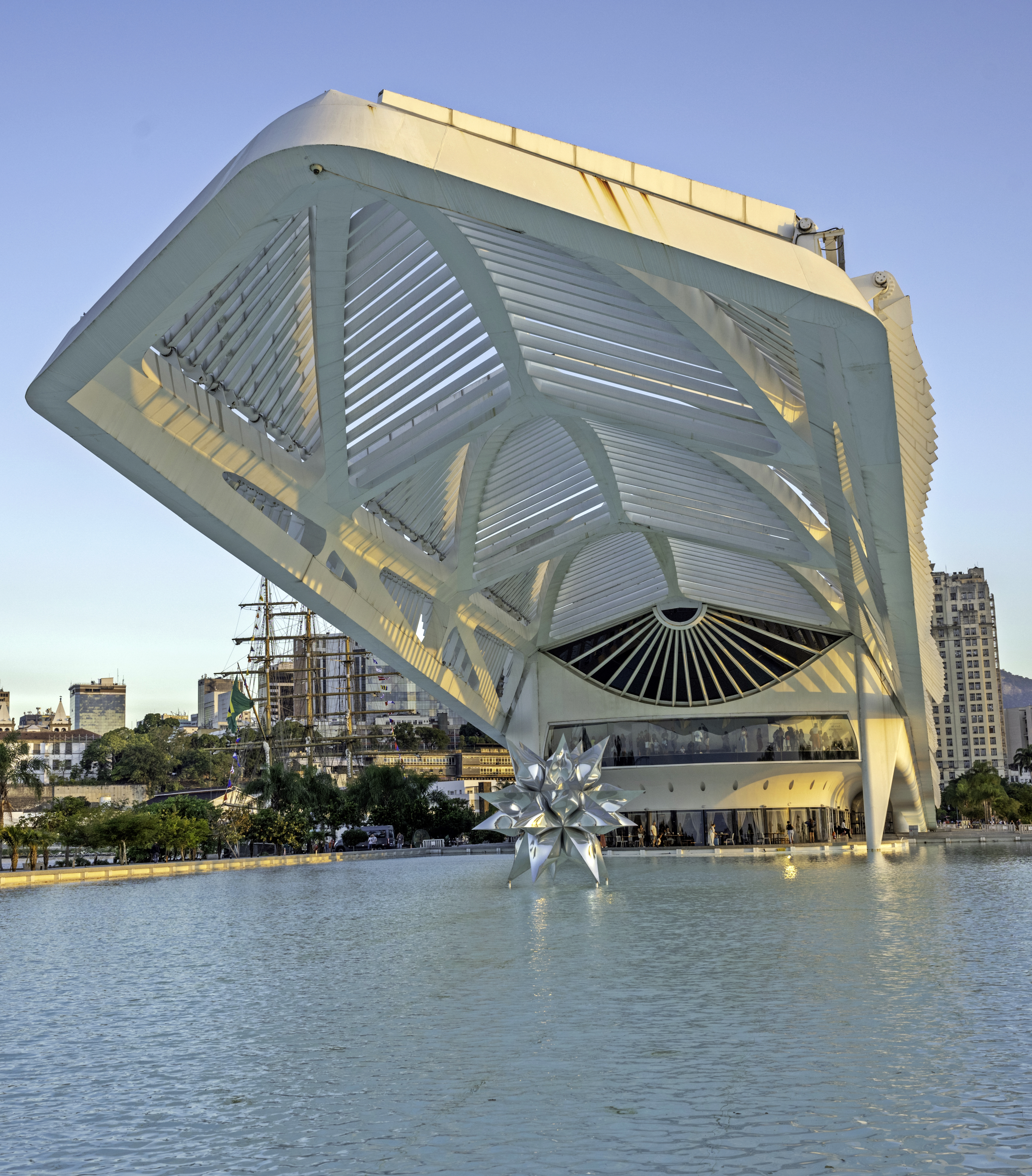
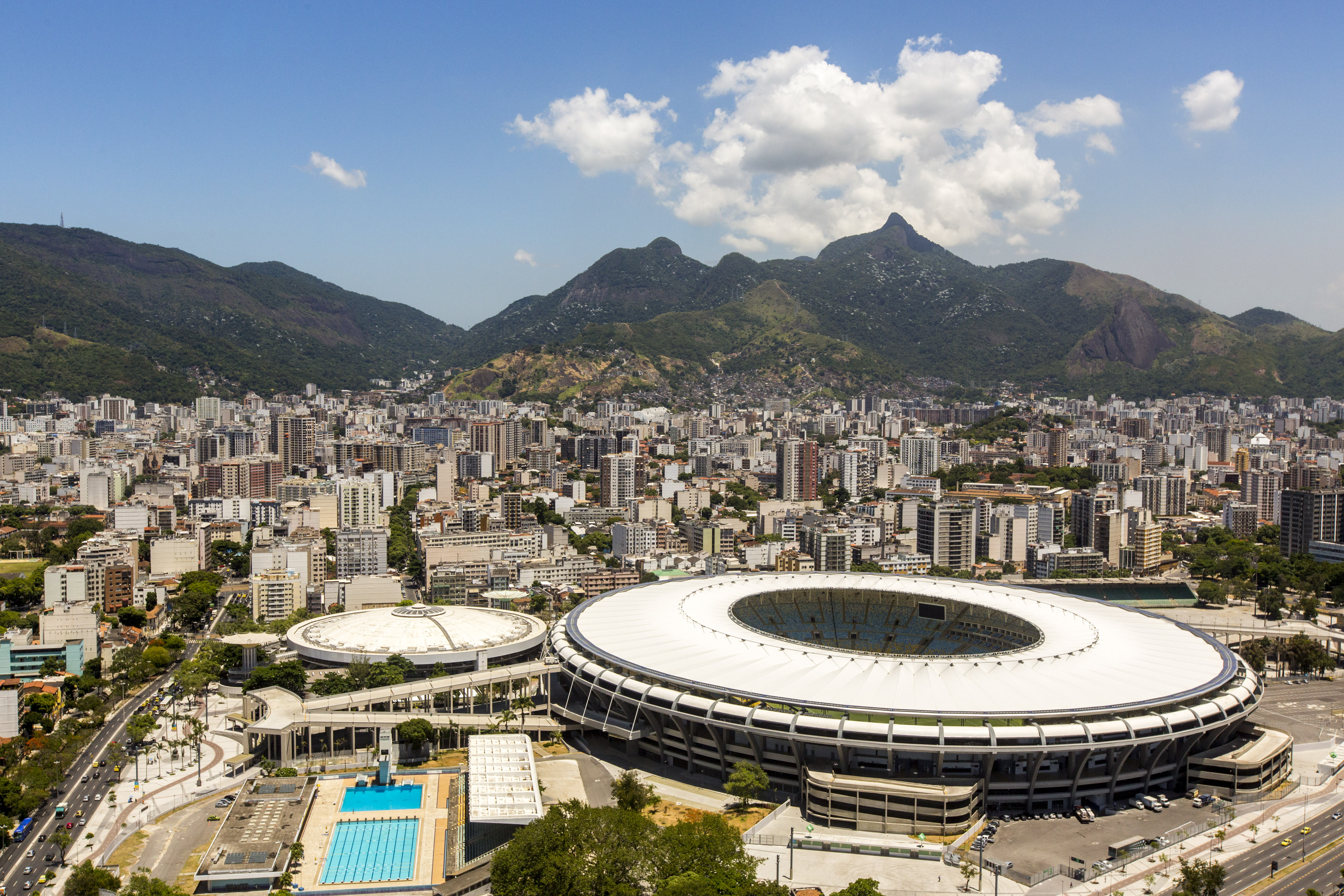
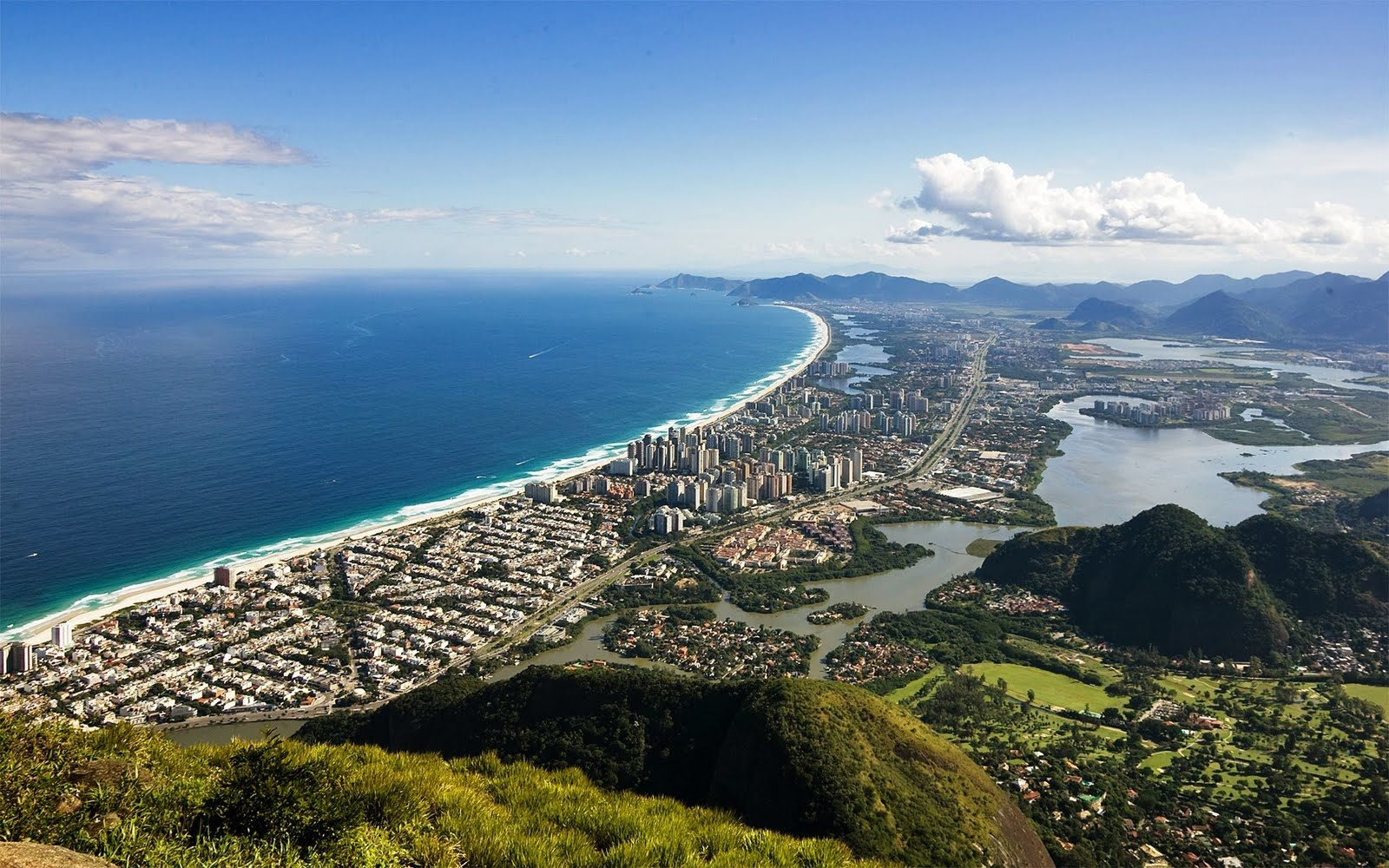
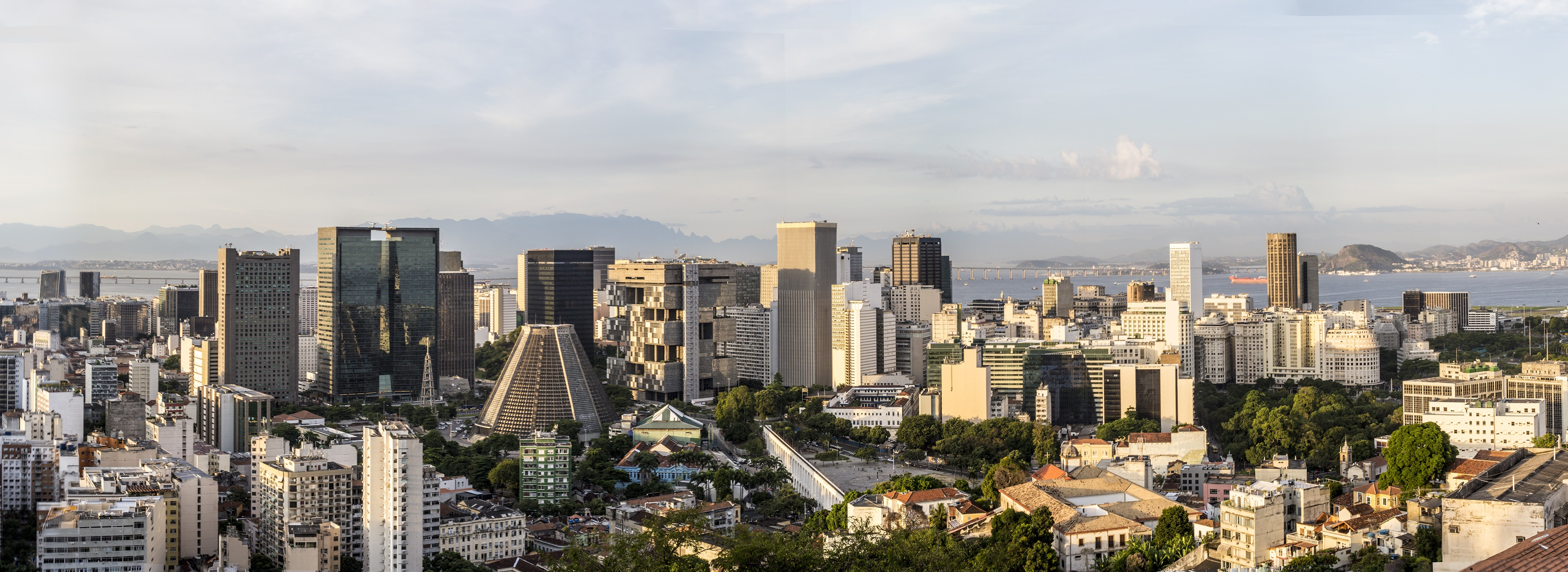
- Christ the Redeemer on Corcovado with Sugarloaf Mountain and Guanabara Bay (background) Sugarloaf Cable Car Theatro Municipal Museum of Tomorrow Maracanã Stadium Barra da Tijuca Skyline of Centro from Santa Teresa, with the Metropolitan Cathedral (left), Carioca Aqueduct (center) and Rio-Niterói Bridge (background)

- Flag Coat of arms
- Nicknames: Cidade Maravilhosa (Marvelous City), Princesa Maravilhosa (Marvelous Princess), Cidade dos Brasileiros (City of Brazilians)
- Interactive map of Rio de Janeiro
- Location within Brazil Location within Rio de Janeiro state Rio de Janeiro (South America)
- Coordinates: 22°54′40″S 43°12′20″W
- Country: Brazil
- Region: Southeast
- State: Rio de Janeiro
- Historic countries: Kingdom of Portugal; United Kingdom of Portugal, Brazil and the Algarves; Empire of Brazil
- Settled: 1555; 471 years ago
- Founded: 1 March 1565; 461 years ago
- Named for: Saint Sebastian; Guanabara Bay

Government
  - Type: Mayor-council
  - Body: Municipal Chamber of Rio de Janeiro
  - Mayor: Eduardo Cavaliere (PSD)
  - Vice Mayor: Vacant

Area
  - Municipality: 1,221 km^{2} (471 sq mi)
  - Metro: 4,539.8 km^{2} (1,752.8 sq mi)
- Elevation: 2 m (6.6 ft)
- Highest elevation: 1,020 m (3,350 ft)
- Lowest elevation: 0 m (0 ft)

Population (2025)
  - Municipality: 6,730,729
  - Rank: 4th in South America; 2nd (Note: 1st by international tourists) in Brazil
  - Density: 5,174.6/km^{2} (13,402/sq mi)
  - Urban: 11,616,000
  - Metro: 13,930,000 (2nd (Note: 1st by international tourists))
  - Metro density: 2,705.1/km^{2} (7,006/sq mi)
- Demonym: Carioca

GDP (nominal, 2023)
  - Metro: R$831 billion (US$148.58 billion)
  - Per capita: R$69,640 (US$12,451.28)
- Time zone: UTC−3 (BRT)
- Postal Code: 20000-001 to 23799-999
- Area code: 21
- HDI (2021): 0.805 – very high
- Website: en.prefeitura.rio

UNESCO World Heritage Site
- Official name: Rio de Janeiro: Carioca Landscapes between the Mountain and the Sea
- Type: Cultural
- Criteria: vi
- Designated: 2012 (36th session)
- Reference no.: 1100

Rio de Janeiro, (Note: British English: /ˈriːoʊ də dʒəˈnɪəroʊ/ REE-oh də jə-NEER-oh, American English: /ˈriːoʊ deɪ ʒəˈnɛəroʊ/ REE-oh day zhə-NAIR-oh; Brazilian Portuguese: [ˈʁi.u d(ʒi) ʒɐˈne(j)ɾu].) also known simply as Rio, is the capital and largest city of the state of Rio de Janeiro. It is the second-largest city in Brazil after São Paulo, and the largest by number of international tourists. It has a population of 6 million in the city proper, and 13 million in its metropolitan area as of 2025. It is also the sixth-most-populous city in the Americas.

Founded in 1565, the city was initially the seat of the Captaincy of Rio de Janeiro, a domain of the Portuguese Empire. In 1763, it became the capital of the State of Brazil. In 1808, when the Portuguese Royal Court moved to Brazil, Rio de Janeiro became the seat of the court of Queen Maria I of Portugal. Under the leadership of her son, Prince Regent John of Braganza, Maria raised Brazil to the dignity of a kingdom within the United Kingdom of Portugal, Brazil, and Algarves. Rio remained as the capital of the pluricontinental monarchy until 1822, when the Brazilian War of Independence began. This is the only instance in modern history that the capital of a colonizing country officially shifted to a city in one of its colonies. Rio de Janeiro subsequently served as the capital of the Empire of Brazil until 1889, and then the capital of republican Brazil until 1960, when the capital was moved to Brasília.

Rio de Janeiro has the second largest municipal GDP in the country, and 30th-largest in the world as of 2008, estimated at R$343 billion. It is home to the headquarters of major Brazilian oil, mining, and telecommunications companies, including two of the country's largest corporations, Petrobras and Vale, and Latin America's largest telemedia conglomerate, Grupo Globo. The home of many universities and institutes, it is the second-largest center of research and development in Brazil, accounting for 17 percent of national scientific output according to 2005 data. Despite the perception of a high crime rate, the city actually has a lower incidence of crime than most state capitals in Brazil.

Rio de Janeiro is one of the most visited cities in the Southern Hemisphere and is known for its natural settings, carnival, samba, bossa nova, and beaches such as Barra da Tijuca, Copacabana, Ipanema, and Leblon. In addition to the beaches, other landmarks include the statue of Christ the Redeemer atop Corcovado mountain, named one of the New Seven Wonders of the World; Sugarloaf Mountain with its cable car; the Sambódromo, a permanent grandstand-lined parade avenue which is used during Carnival; and Maracanã Stadium, one of the world's largest football stadiums. Rio de Janeiro was the host of the 2016 Summer Olympics and Paralympics, making the city the first South American and Portuguese-speaking city to host these events, and the third time that the Olympics were held in a Southern Hemisphere city. The Maracanã Stadium held the finals of the 1950 and 2014 FIFA World Cups and the 2013 FIFA Confederations Cup. The city also hosted the XV Pan American Games in 2007, and the G20 summit in 2024, and will host the FIFA Women's World Cup in 2027.

== History ==
Historical affiliations

Portuguese Empire 1565–1815
United Kingdom of Portugal, Brazil and the Algarves 1815–1822
Empire of Brazil 1822–1889
Republic of Brazil 1889–present

=== Pre-Cabraline period ===
The region of Rio was inhabited by the Tupi, Puri, Botocudo and Maxakalí peoples.

=== Colonial period ===
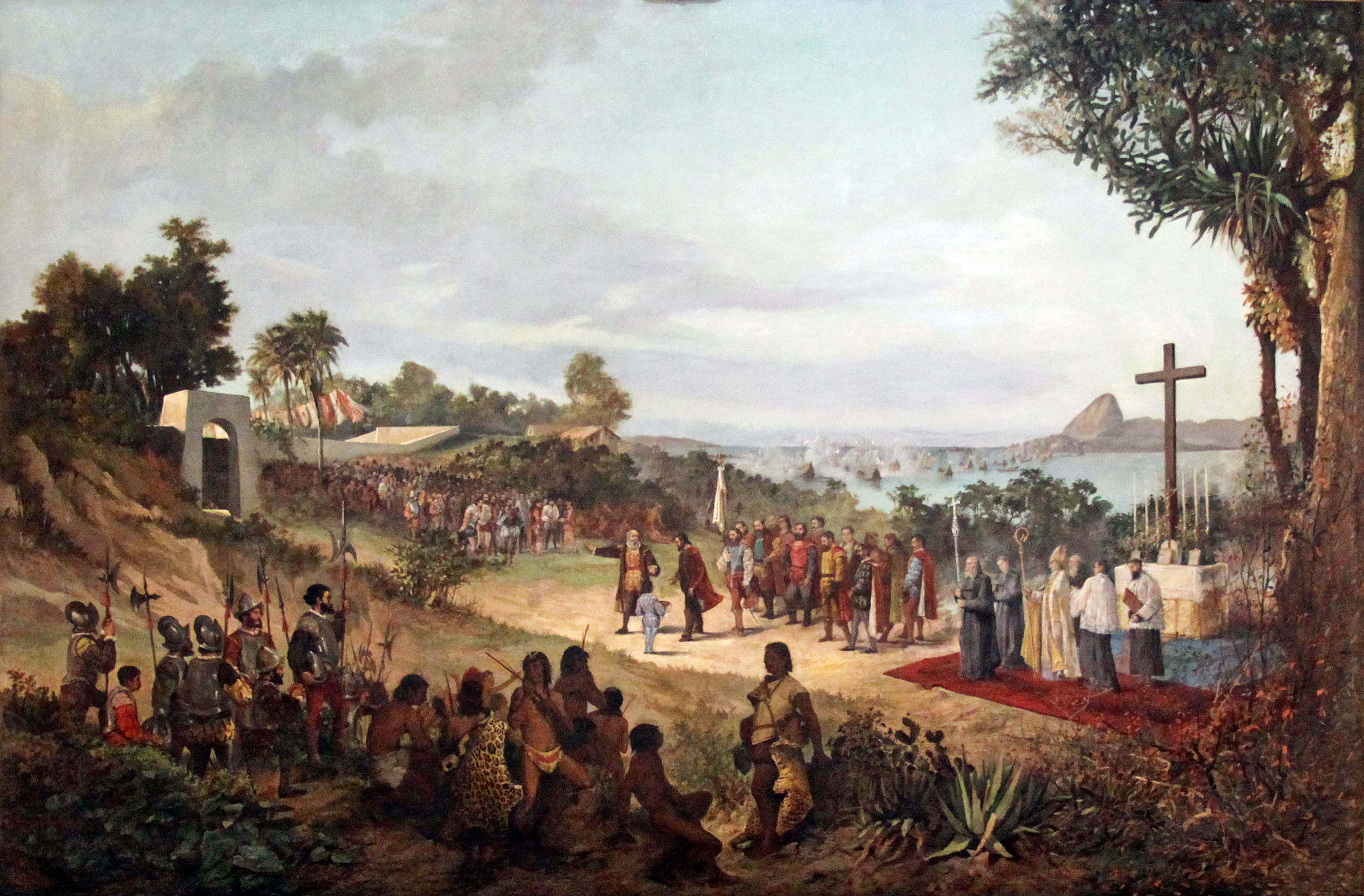
Founding of Rio de Janeiro on 1 March 1565. The painting depicts the Governor General of Brazil, Mem de Sá, presenting the key to the city to the alcaide.

Europeans first encountered Guanabara Bay on 1 January 1502 (hence Rio de Janeiro, "January River"), during a Portuguese expedition under explorer Gaspar de Lemos, captain of a ship in Pedro Álvares Cabral's fleet, or under Gonçalo Coelho. Allegedly the Florentine explorer Amerigo Vespucci participated as an observer at the invitation of King Manuel I in the same expedition.

In 1555, one of the islands of Guanabara Bay, now called Villegagnon Island, was occupied by 500 French colonists under the French admiral Nicolas Durand de Villegaignon. Consequently, Villegagnon built Fort Coligny on the island when attempting to establish the France Antarctique colony. Eventually, this French settlement became too much of a threat to the established Portuguese colony, and in 1560 the order was made to get rid of them. A years-long military aggression was then initiated by the new Governor General of Brazil Mem de Sá, and later continued by his nephew Estácio de Sá. On 20 January 1567, a final defeat was imposed on the French forces, and they were decisively expelled from Brazil for good.

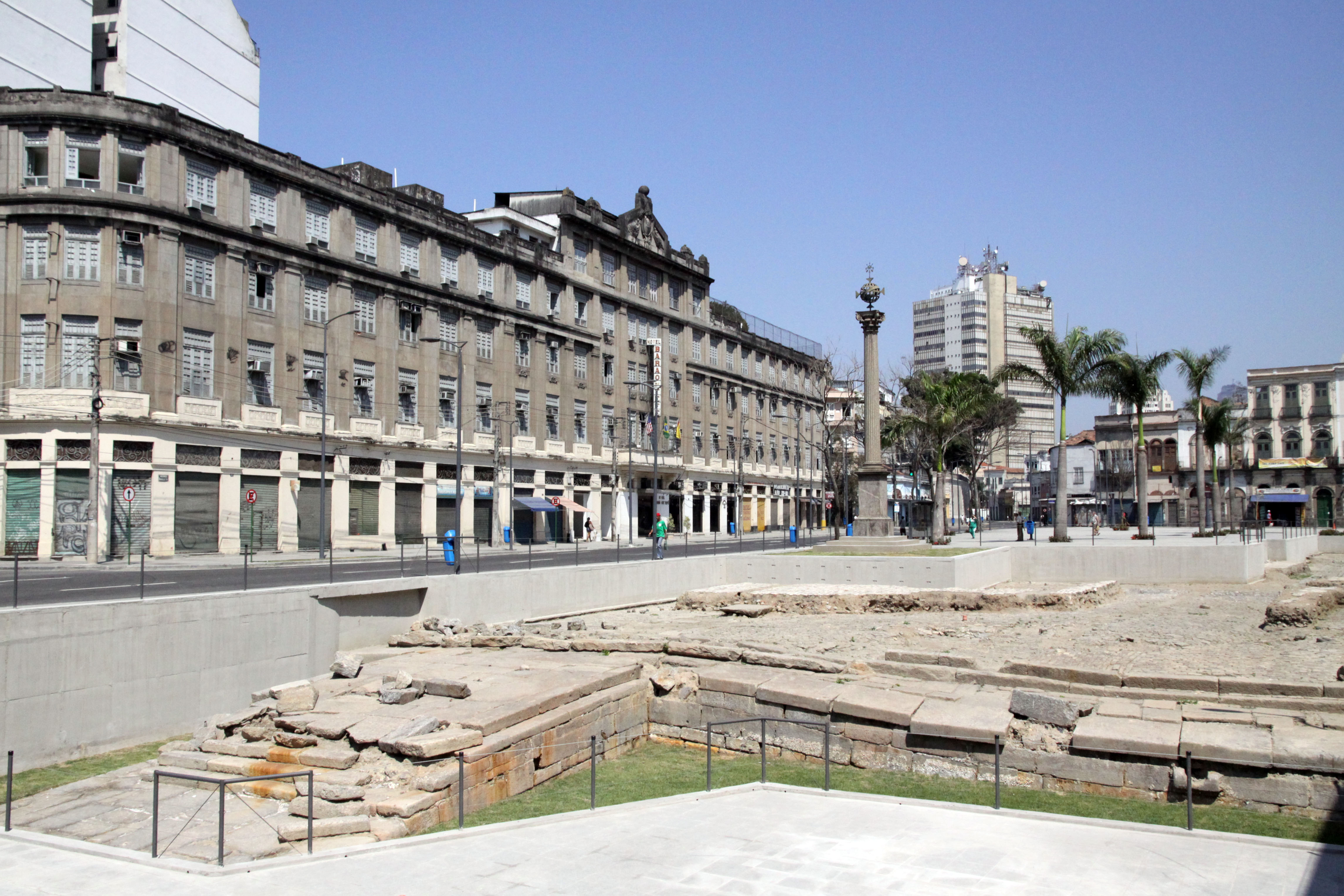
Between 500 thousand and one million Africans were trafficked at Valongo Wharf through the Atlantic slave trade

The city of Rio de Janeiro proper was founded on 1 March 1565 by the Portuguese, led by Estácio de Sá, including Antônio de Mariz. It was named São Sebastião do Rio de Janeiro, in honor of St. Sebastian, the saint who was the namesake and patron of the Portuguese then-monarch Sebastião. Rio de Janeiro was the name of Guanabara Bay. Until early in the 18th century, the city was threatened or invaded by several mostly French pirates and buccaneers, such as Jean-François Duclerc and René Duguay-Trouin.

In the late 17th century, Bandeirantes discovered gold and diamonds in the neighboring captaincy of Minas Gerais, thus Rio de Janeiro became a much more practical port for exporting diversified sources of wealth (gold, precious stones, besides sugar) than Salvador, Bahia, much farther northeast. On 27 January 1763, the colonial administration in Portuguese America was moved from Salvador to Rio de Janeiro. The city remained primarily a colonial capital until 1808, when the Portuguese royal family and most of the associated Lisbon nobles, fleeing from Napoleon's invasion of Portugal, moved to Rio de Janeiro.

=== Portuguese royal period ===
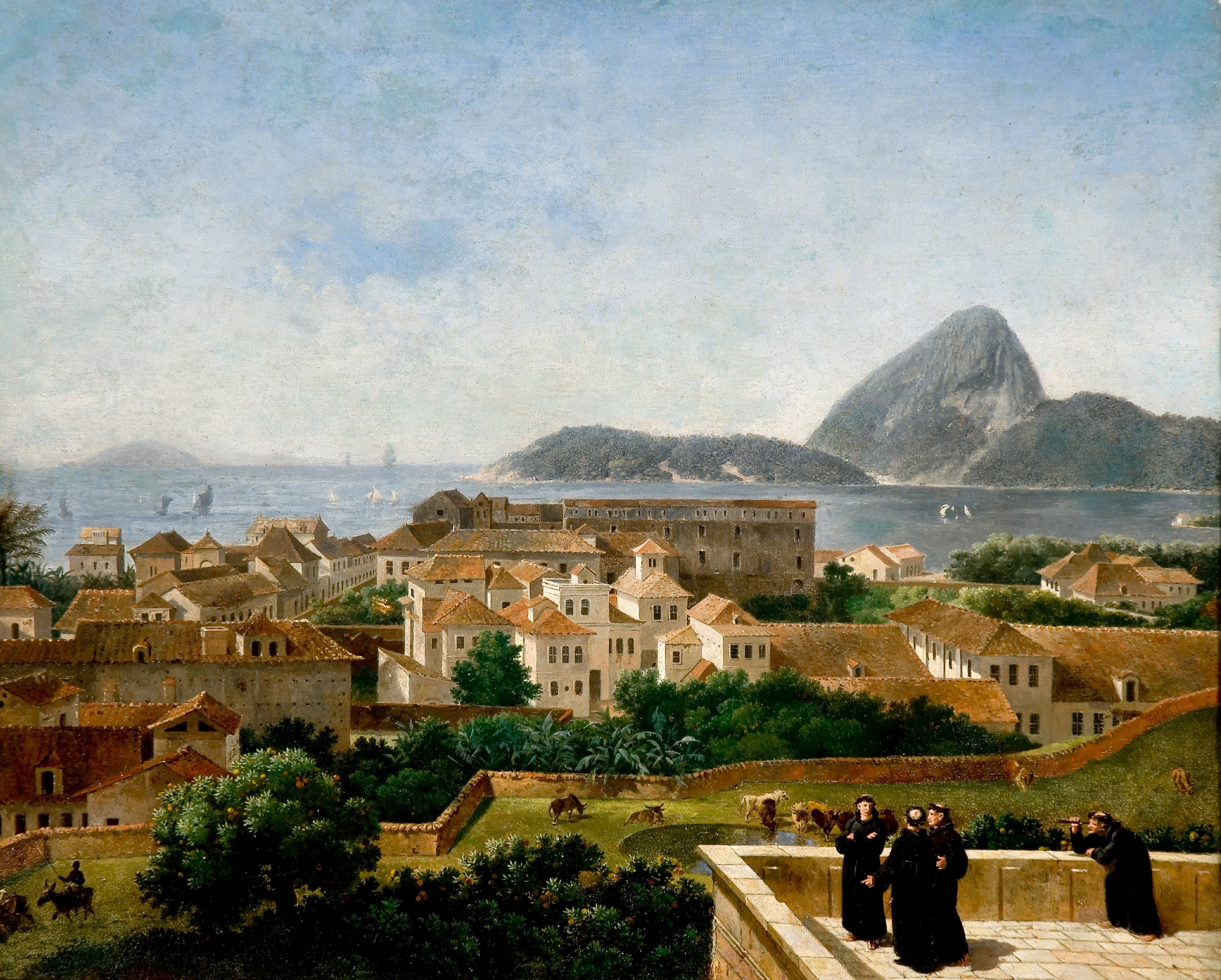
View of the bay and the entry of the city of Rio as seen from the terrace of the convent of Santo Antônio, by Nicolas-Antoine Taunay (1816)

The kingdom's capital was transferred to the city, which, thus, became the only European capital outside of Europe. As there was no physical space or urban structure to accommodate hundreds of noblemen who arrived suddenly, many inhabitants were evicted from their homes. In the first decade, several educational establishments were created, such as the Military Academy, the Royal School of Sciences, Arts and Crafts and the Imperial Academy of Fine Arts, as well as the National Library of Brazil – with the largest collection in Latin America – and The Botanical Garden. The first printed newspaper in Brazil, the Gazeta do Rio de Janeiro, came into circulation during this period. When Brazil was elevated to Kingdom in 1815, it became the capital of the United Kingdom of Portugal, Brazil and the Algarves until the return of the Portuguese Royal Family to Lisbon in 1821, but remained as capital of the Kingdom of Brazil.

From the colonial period until the first independent era, Rio de Janeiro was a city of enslaved people. There was a large influx of African slaves to Rio de Janeiro: in 1819, there were 145,000 slaves in the captaincy. In 1840, the number of enslaved people reached 220,000. Between 1811 and 1831, 500,000 to a million enslaved people arrived in Rio de Janeiro through Valongo Wharf, which is now a World Heritage Site. The Port of Rio de Janeiro was the largest enslaved people port in America.

=== Imperial period ===
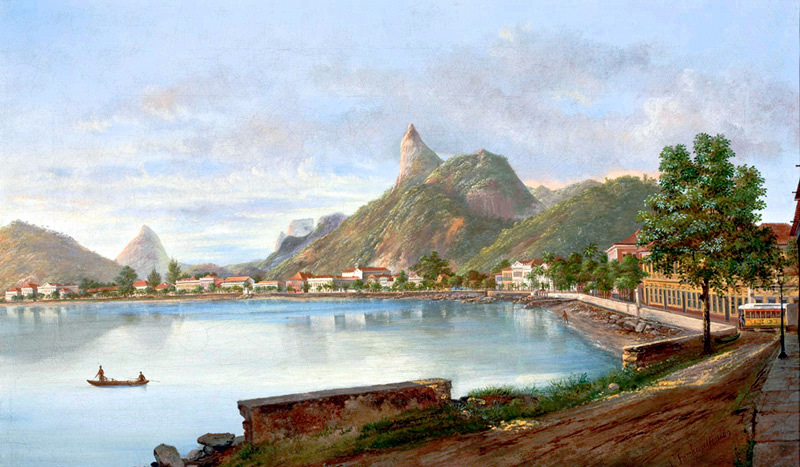
Botafogo Bay in 1869

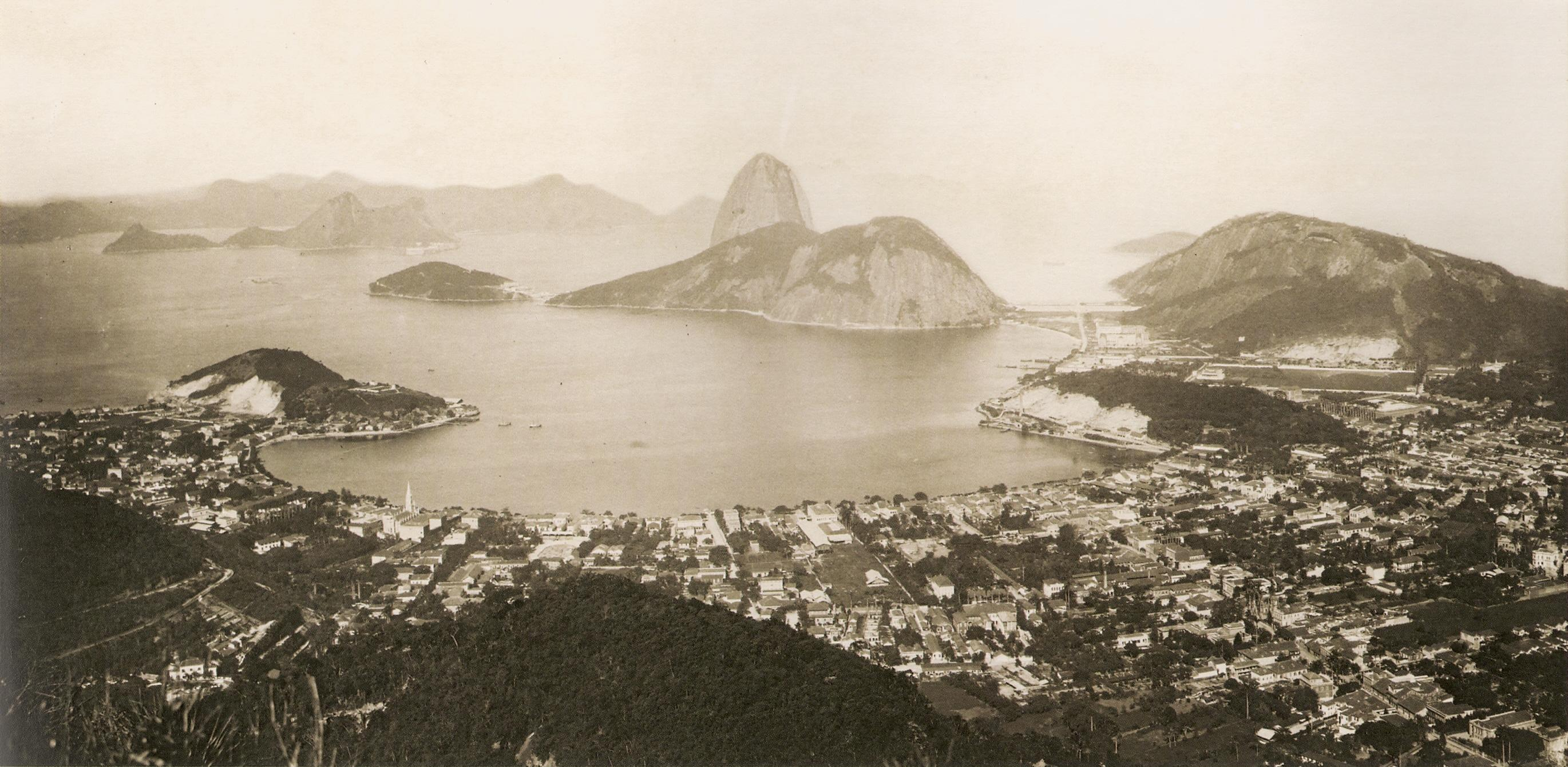
Botafogo Bay in 1889

When Prince Pedro proclaimed the independence of Brazil in 1822, he decided to keep Rio de Janeiro as the capital of his new empire while the place was enriched with sugar cane agriculture in the Campos region and, especially, with the new coffee cultivation in the Paraíba Valley. In order to separate the province from the capital of the Empire, the city was converted in Neutral Municipality in 1834, passing the province of Rio de Janeiro to have Niterói as capital.

As a political center of the country, Rio concentrated the political-partisan life of the Empire. It was the main stage of the abolitionist and republican movements in the last half of the 19th century. At that time, the number of enslaved people was drastically reduced, and the city was developed, with modern drains, animal trams, train stations crossing the city, gas and electric lighting, telephone and telegraph wiring, water and river plumbing. Rio continued as the capital of Brazil after 1889, when the monarchy was replaced by a republic.

On 6 February 1889, the Bangu Textile Factory was founded, with the name of Industrial Progress Company of Brazil (Companhia Progresso Industrial do Brasil). The factory was officially opened on 8 March 1893, in a complex with varying architectural styles like Italianate, Neo-Gothic and a tower in Mansard Roof style. After the opening in 1893, workers from Great Britain arrived in Bangu to work in the textile factory. The old farms became worker villages with red-brick houses, and a neo-Gothic church was created, which still exists as the Saint Sebastian and Saint Cecilia Parish Church. Street cinemas and cultural buildings also appeared. In May 1894, Thomas Donohoe, a British worker from Busby, Scotland, arrived in Bangu.

Donohoe was amazed to discover that there was absolutely no knowledge of football among Brazilians. So he wrote to his wife, Elizabeth, asking her to bring a football when she joined him. And shortly after her arrival, in September 1894, the first football match in Brazil took place in the field beside the textile factory. It was a five-a-side match between British workers, and took place six months before the first game organized by Charles Miller in São Paulo. However, the Bangu Football Club was not formally created until 1904.

=== Republican period ===
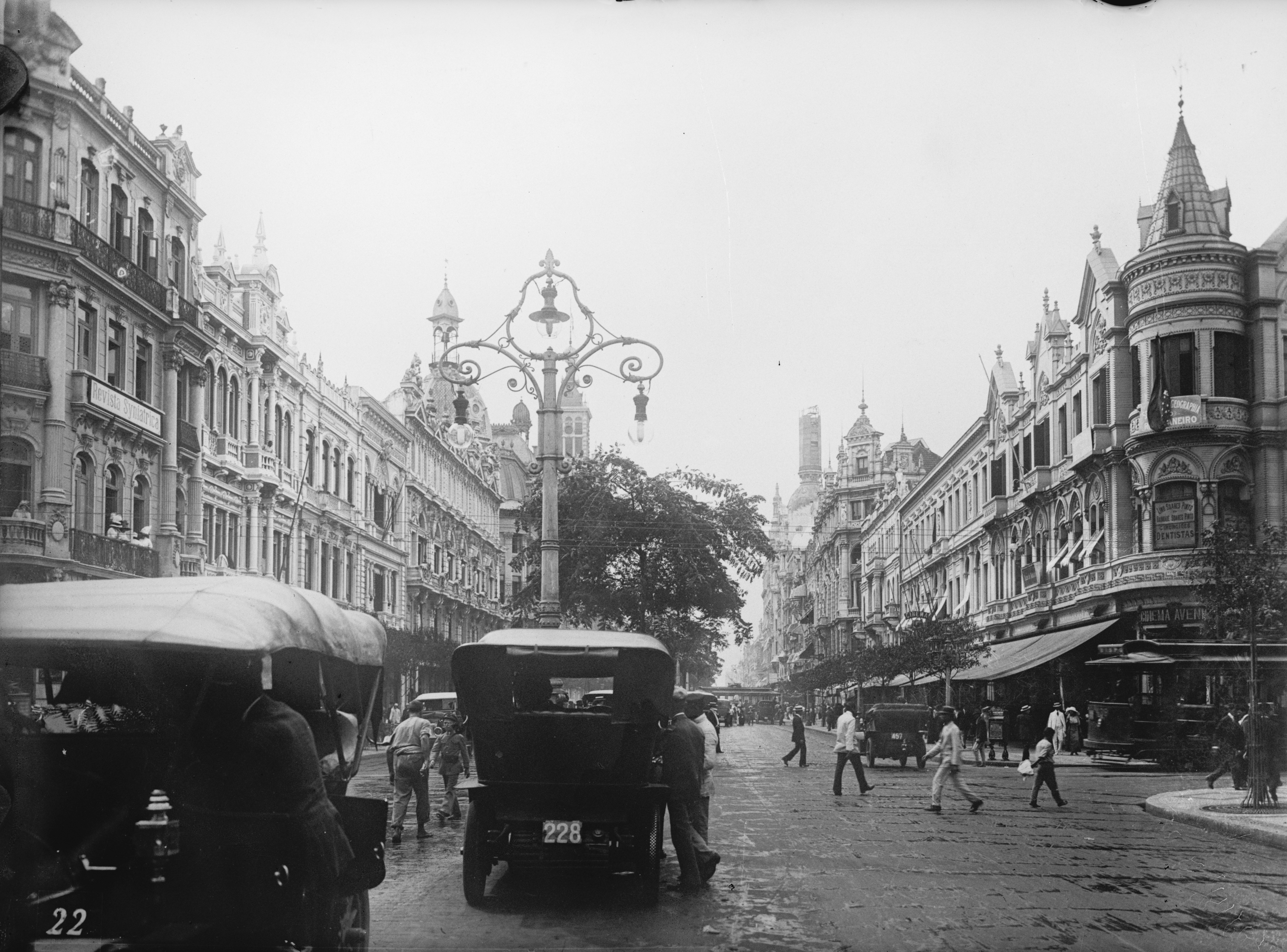
Rio de Janeiro, c. 1910s

At the time Brazil's Old Republic was established, the city lacked urban planning and sanitation, which helped spread several diseases, such as yellow fever, dysentery, variola, tuberculosis and even black death. Pereira Passos, who was named mayor in 1902, imposed reforms to modernize the city, demolishing the cortiços where most of the poor population lived. These people then moved to live in the city's hills, creating the first favelas. Inspired by the city of Paris, Passos built the Municipal Theater, the National Museum of Fine Arts and the National Library in the city's center; brought electric power to Rio and created larger avenues to adapt the city to automobiles. Passos also named Oswaldo Cruz as Director General of Public Health. Cruz's plans to clean the city of diseases included compulsory vaccination of the entire population and forced entry into houses to kill mosquitoes and rats. The people of the city rebelled against Cruz's policy, in what would be known as the Vaccine Revolt.

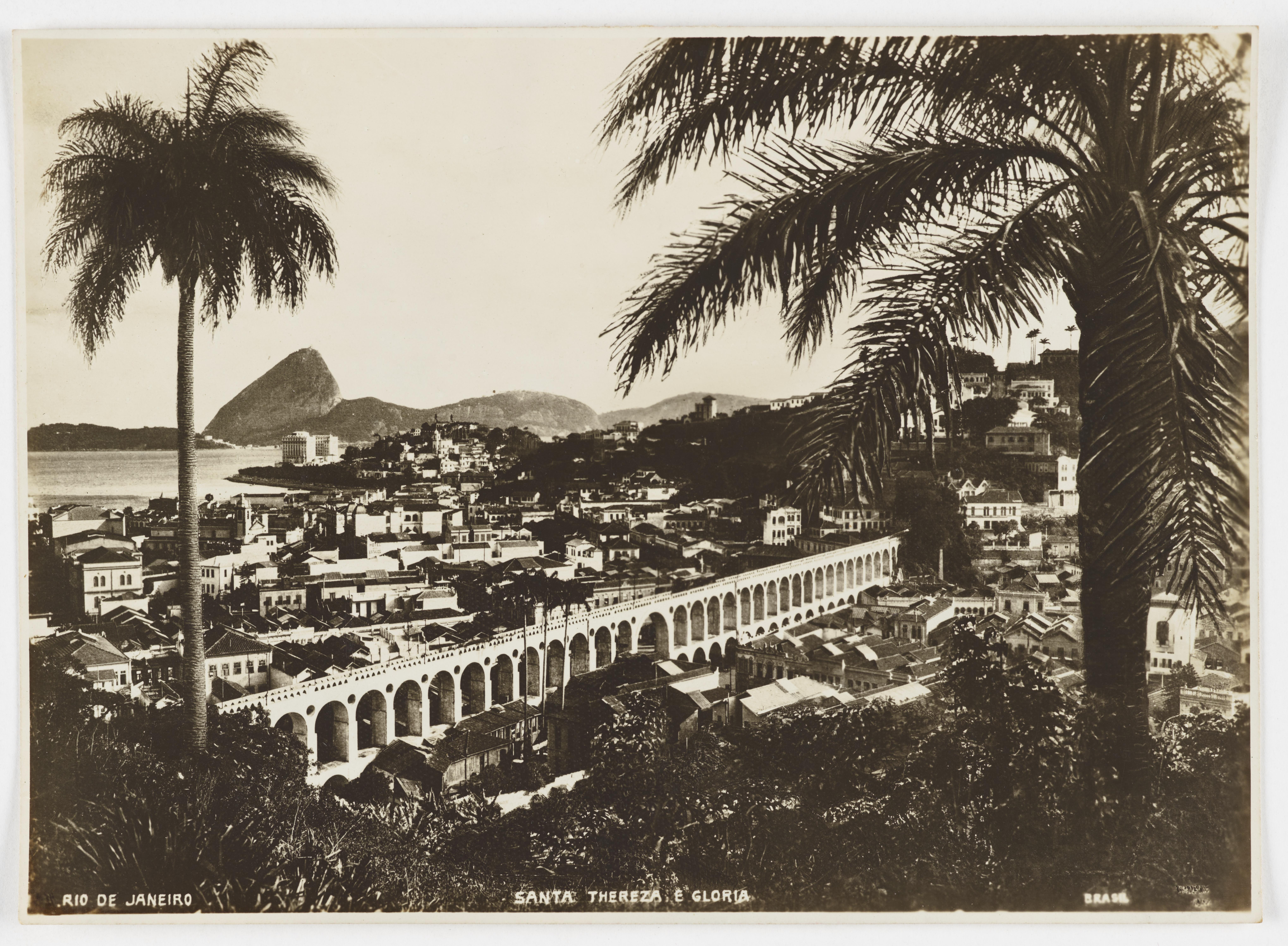
Carioca Aqueduct in the 1920s

In 1910, Rio saw the Revolt of the Lash, where Afro-Brazilian crew members in the Brazilian Navy mutinied against the heavy use of corporal punishment, which was similar to the punishment enslaved people received. The mutineers took control of the battleship Minas Geraes and threatened to fire on the city. Another military revolt occurred in 1922, the Copacabana Fort revolt, a march against the Old Republic's coronelism and café com leite politics. This revolt marked the beginning of Tenentism, a movement which resulted in the Revolution of 1930 that started the Vargas Era.

Until the early years of the 20th century, the city was largely limited to the neighborhood now known as the historic city center (see below), on the mouth of Guanabara Bay. The city's center of gravity began to shift south and west to the so-called Zona Sul (South Zone) in the early part of the 20th century, when the first tunnel was built under the mountains between Botafogo and the neighborhood that is now known as Copacabana. Expansion of the city to the north and south was facilitated by the consolidation and electrification of Rio's streetcar transit system after 1905. Botafogos natural environment, combined with the fame of the Copacabana Palace Hotel, the luxury hotel of the Americas in the 1930s, helped Rio to gain the reputation it still holds today as a beach party town. This reputation has been somewhat tarnished in recent years by favela violence resulting from the narcotics trade and militias.

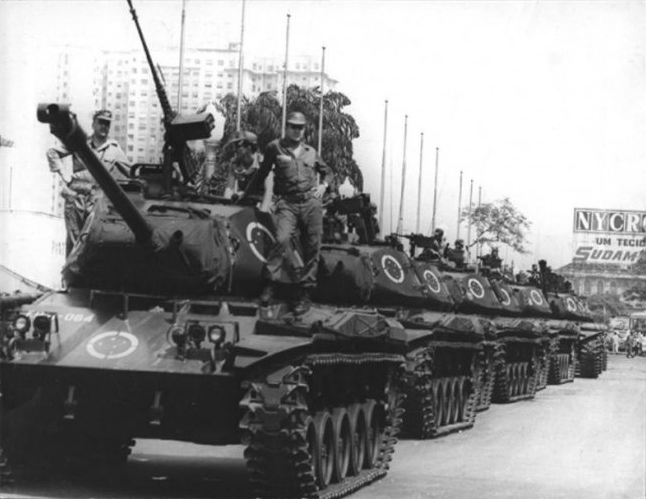
A convoy of M41 Walker Bulldog tanks along the streets of the city in 1968 during the military rule. At the time, Rio de Janeiro was a city-state, capital of Guanabara.

Plans for moving the nation's capital city from Rio de Janeiro to the center of Brazil had been occasionally discussed, and when Juscelino Kubitschek was elected president in 1955, it was partially on the strength of promises to build a new capital. Though many thought that it was just campaign rhetoric, Kubitschek managed to have Brasília and a new Federal District built, at great cost, by 1960. On 21 April of that year, the capital of Brazil was officially moved to Brasília. The territory of the former Federal District became its own state, Guanabara, after the bay that borders it to the east, encompassing just the city of Rio de Janeiro. After the 1964 coup d'état that installed a military dictatorship, the city-state was the only state left in Brazil to oppose the military. Then, in 1975, a presidential decree known as "The Fusion" removed the city's federative status and merged it with the State of Rio de Janeiro, with the city of Rio de Janeiro replacing Niterói as the state's capital, and establishing the Rio de Janeiro Metropolitan Region.

In 1992, Rio hosted the Earth Summit, a United Nations conference to fight environmental degradation. Twenty years later, in 2012, the city hosted another conference on sustainable development, named United Nations Conference on Sustainable Development. The city hosted the World Youth Day in 2013, the second World Youth Day in South America and first in Brazil. In the sports field, Rio de Janeiro was the host of the 2007 Pan American Games and the 2014 FIFA World Cup. On 2 October 2009, the International Olympic Committee announced that Rio de Janeiro would host the 2016 Olympic Games and the 2016 Paralympic Games, beating competitors Chicago, Tokyo, and Madrid. The city became the first South American city to host the event and the second Latin American city (after Mexico City in 1968) to host the Games. Since the early 2010s, Rio de Janeiro has been inscribed as a UNESCO World Heritage Site for its arts, urban culture and designed landscapes set around a natural environment.

== Geography ==
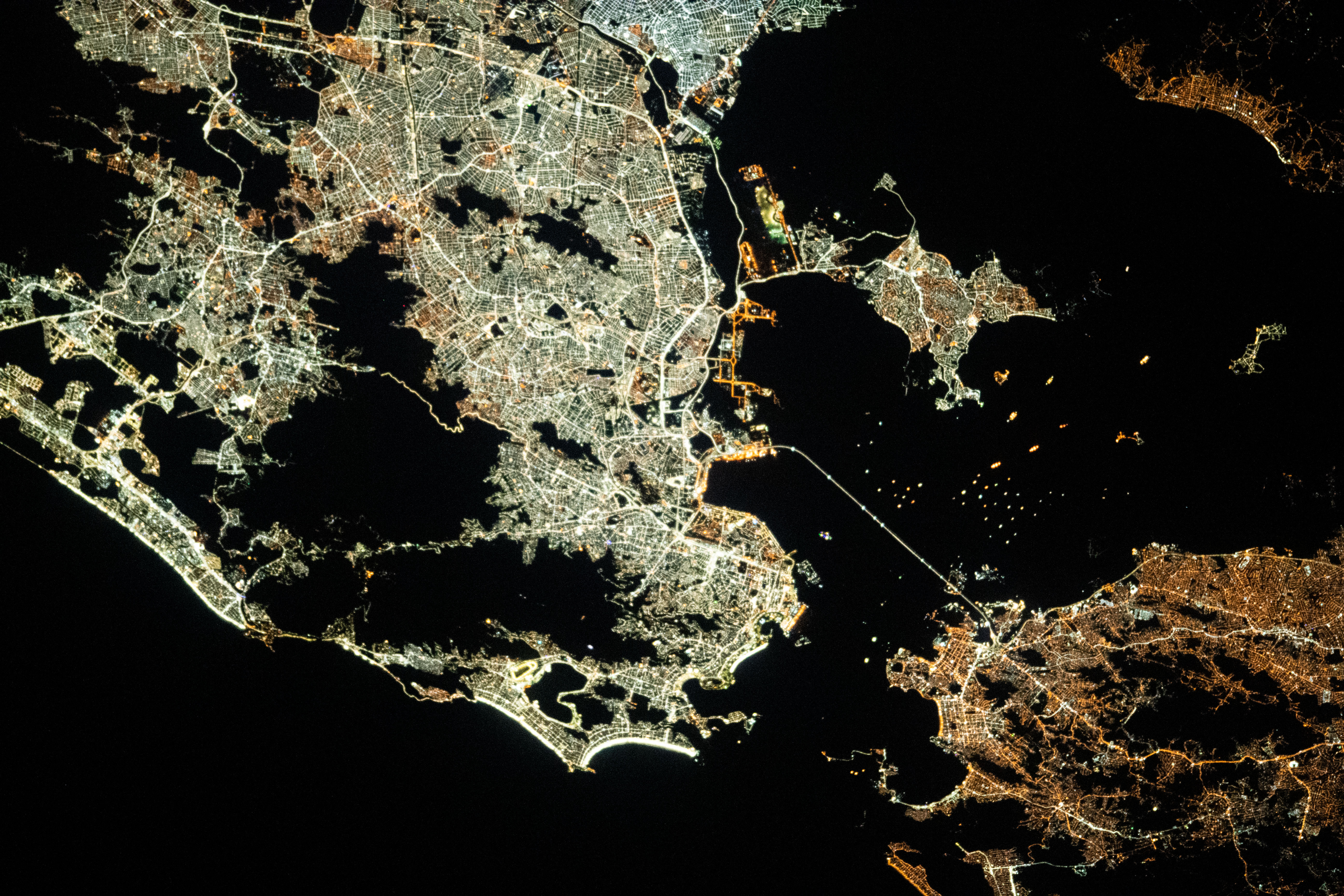
Satellite view of Greater Rio de Janeiro at night seen from ISS

Location in the state of Rio de Janeiro

Rio de Janeiro is near the west end of a strip (from Cabo Frio to just east of Ilha Grande) of Brazil's Atlantic coast close to the Tropic of Capricorn where the shoreline is oriented east and west; the city thus faces largely south. It was founded at the entrance to an inlet, Guanabara Bay (Baía de Guanabara), which is marked by a point of land called Sugar Loaf (Pão de Açúcar) – a "calling card" of the city.

The population of the city of Rio de Janeiro, occupying an area of 1,182.3 km^{2} (456.5 sq mi), is about 6,000,000. The population of the greater metropolitan area is estimated at 11–13.5 million. Residents of the city are known as cariocas. The official song of Rio is "Cidade Maravilhosa", by composer André Filho.

=== Parks ===
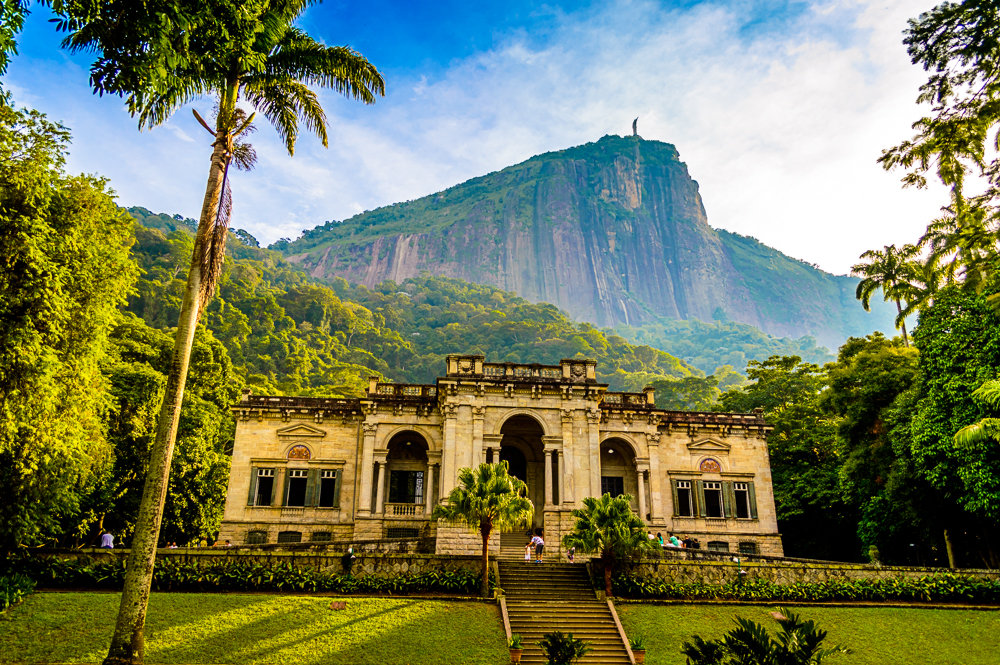
Parque Lage with Corcovado in the background

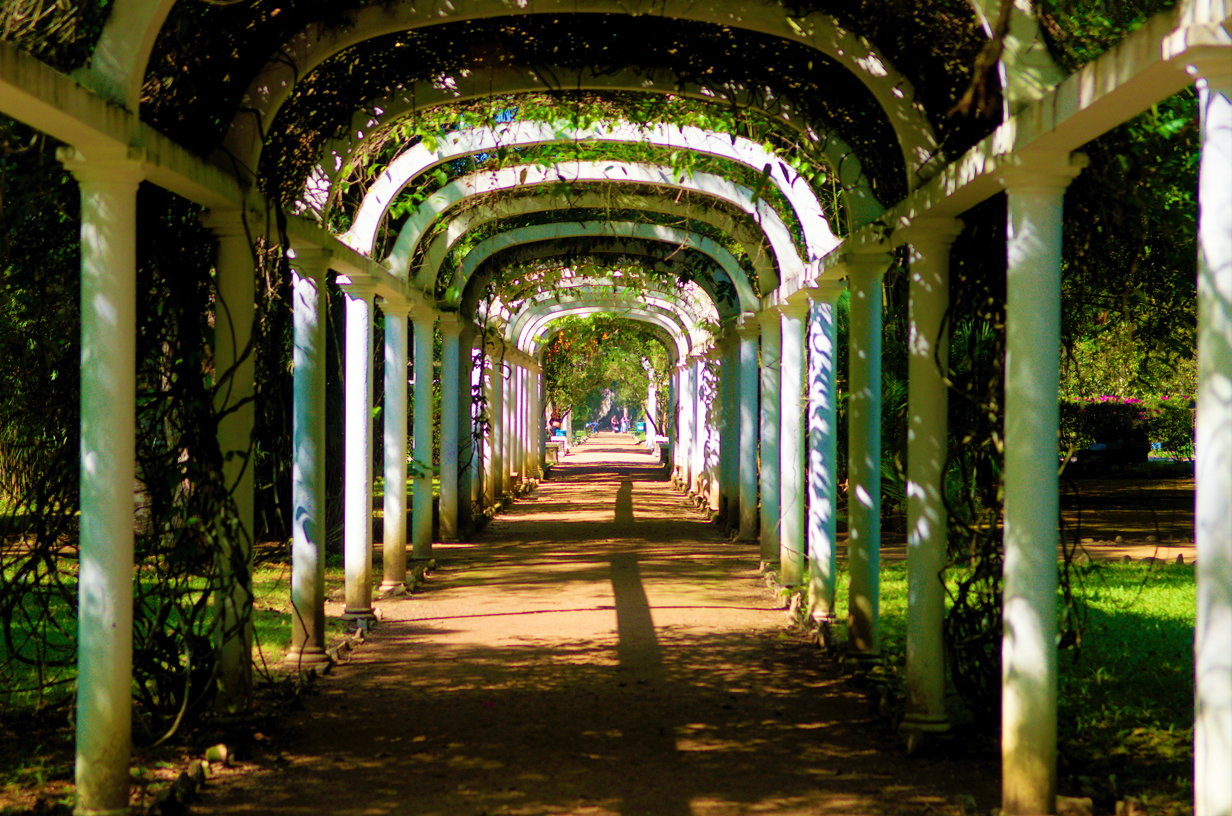
Arches in the Botanical Garden

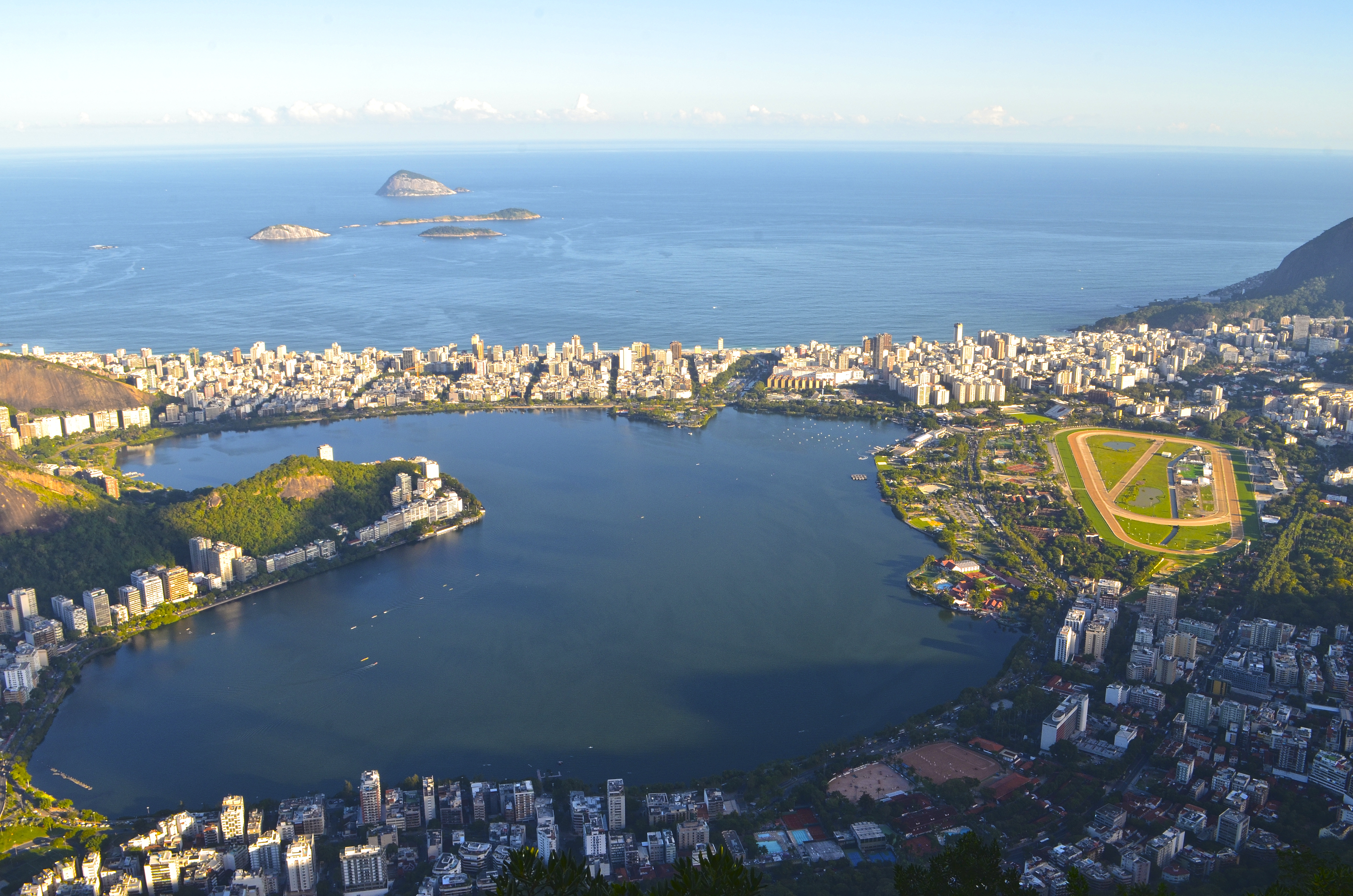
Rodrigo de Freitas Lagoon

The city has parks and ecological reserves such as the Tijuca National Park, the world's first urban forest and UNESCO Environmental Heritage and Biosphere Reserve; Pedra Branca State Park, which houses the highest point of Rio de Janeiro, the peak of Pedra Branca; the Quinta da Boa Vista complex; the Botanical Garden; Rio's Zoo; Parque Lage; and the Passeio Público, the first public park in the Americas. In addition the Flamengo Park is the largest landfill in the city, extending from the center to the south zone, and containing museums and monuments, in addition to much vegetation.

Since 1961, the Tijuca National Park (Parque Nacional da Tijuca), the largest city-surrounded urban forest and the second largest urban forest in the world, has been a National Park. The largest urban forest in the world is the Floresta da Pedra Branca (White Rock Forest), which is located in the West Zone of Rio de Janeiro.

=== Environment ===
Due to the high concentration of industries in the metropolitan region, the city has faced serious problems of environmental pollution. The Guanabara Bay has lost mangrove areas and suffers from residues from domestic and industrial sewage, oils, and heavy metals. Although its waters renew when they reach the sea, the bay is the final receiver of all the tributaries generated along its banks and in the basins of the many rivers and streams that flow into it. The levels of particulate matter in the air are twice as high as those recommended by the World Health Organization, in part because of the large numbers of vehicles in circulation.

The waters of Sepetiba Bay are slowly following the path traced by Guanabara Bay, with sewage generated by a population of the order of 1.29 million inhabitants being released without treatment in streams or rivers. With regard to industrial pollution, highly toxic wastes, with high concentrations of heavy metals – mainly zinc and cadmium – have been dumped over the years by factories in the industrial districts of Santa Cruz, Itaguaí and Nova Iguaçu, constructed under the supervision of State policies.

The Marapendi lagoon and the Rodrigo de Freitas Lagoon have suffered from the leniency of the authorities and the growth in the number of apartment buildings close by. The illegal discharge of sewage and the consequent deaths of algae diminished the oxygenation of the waters, causing fish mortality.

There are, on the other hand, signs of decontamination in the lagoon made through a public-private partnership established in 2008 to ensure that the lagoon waters will eventually be suitable for bathing. The decontamination actions involve the transfer of sludge to large craters present in the lagoon itself, and the creation of a new direct and underground connection with the sea, which will contribute to increasing the daily water exchange between the two environments. However, during the Olympics the lagoon hosted the rowing competitions, and there were numerous concerns about potential infection resulting from human sewage.

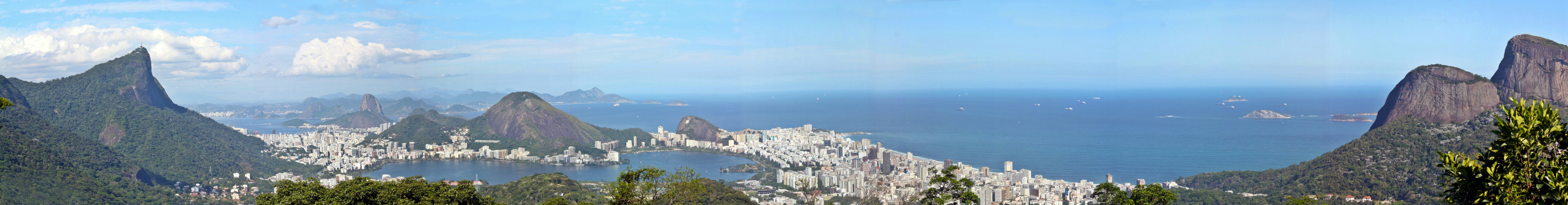
Panorama of the city of Rio de Janeiro highlighting the mountains of Corcovado (left), Sugarloaf (center, background) and Two Brothers (right), from the Chinese Belvedere
Elevated view from Morro Dois Irmãos over Leblon, Ipanema and Lagoa Rodrigo de Freitas, with the forested hills beyond. Morro do Cantagalo and the Cantagalo–Pavão-Pavãozinho communities appear in the centre, while Ipanema Beach and Arpoador extend to the right. In the distance are Pão de Açúcar, the entrance to Guanabara Bay, and the coastal hills and islands of Niterói.

=== Climate ===
==== Overview ====
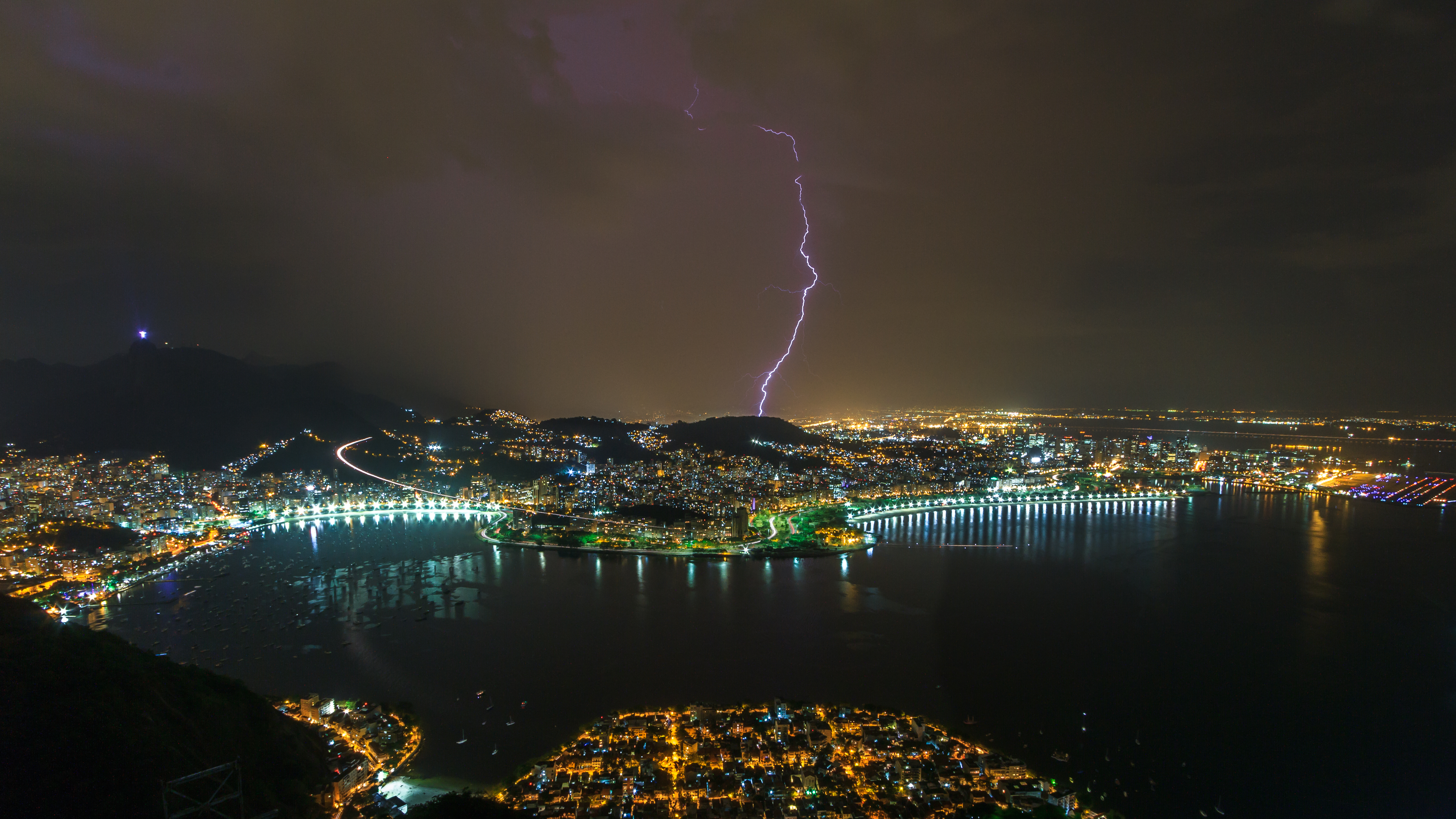
Night storm with lightning in Rio de Janeiro, view from Sugarloaf Mountain

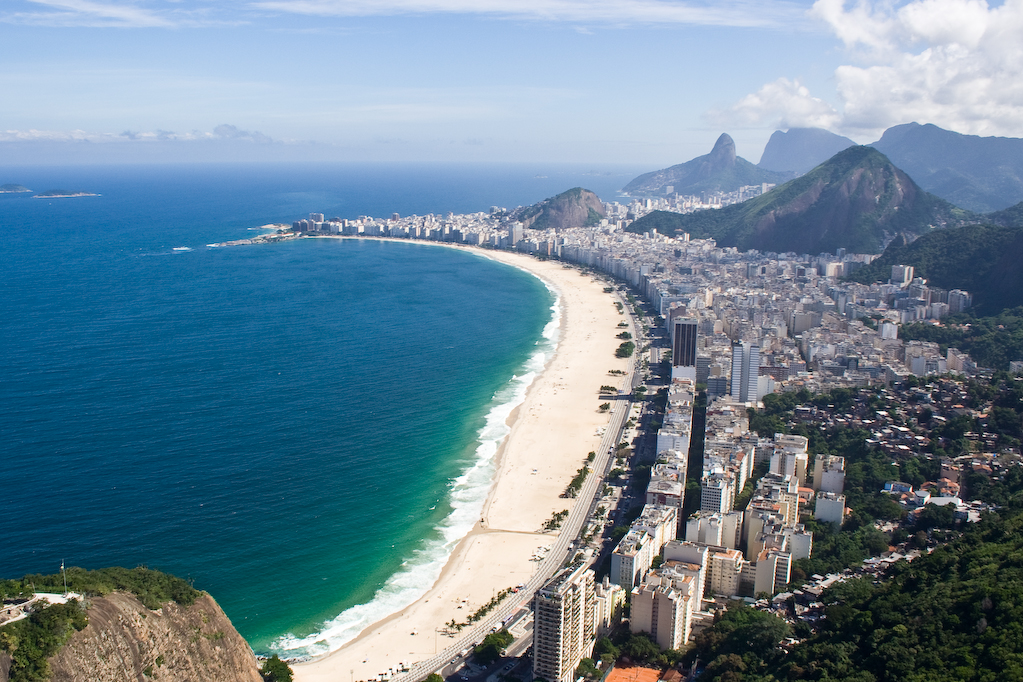
Copacabana Beach on a sunny day

Rio has a tropical wet and dry climate (Köppen: Aw, Trewartha: Awab borderline Awha), and is often characterized by long periods of heavy rain between December and March. The city experiences hot, humid summers, and warm, sunny winters. In inland areas of the city, temperatures above 40 °C (104 °F) are common during the summer, though rarely for long periods, while maximum temperatures above 27 °C (81 °F) occur regularly every month. Temperature varies according to elevation, distance from the coast, and type of vegetation or land use.

Summers are hot and stormy. Temperatures over 40 °C (104 °F) may happen throughout the warmer half-year but are much more common during the summer, often meaning the actual "feels-like" temperature is over 50 °C (122 °F), when there is little wind and the relative humidity percentage is high. Along the coast, the breeze, blowing onshore and offshore, moderates the temperature. Heavy rain is common in the summer, and these have, on some occasions, provoked catastrophic floods and landslides. The mountainous areas register greater rainfall since they constitute a barrier to the humid wind that comes from the Atlantic.

Winters are warm and not as rainy. Cold fronts and dawn/morning sea breezes bring mild temperatures, though average temperatures remain above 25 °C (77 °F).

==== Notable meteorological events ====
Drought is rare, albeit bound to happen occasionally given the city's strongly seasonal tropical climate. The Brazilian drought of 2014–2015, most severe in the Southeast Region and the worst in decades, affected the entire metropolitan region's water supply (a diversion from the Paraíba do Sul River to the Guandu River is a major source for the state's most populous mesoregion). There were plans to divert the Paraíba do Sul to the Sistema Cantareira (Cantareira system) during the water crisis of 2014 in order to help the critically drought-stricken Greater São Paulo area. However, the availability of sufficient rainfall to supply tap water to both metropolitan areas in the future is merely speculative.

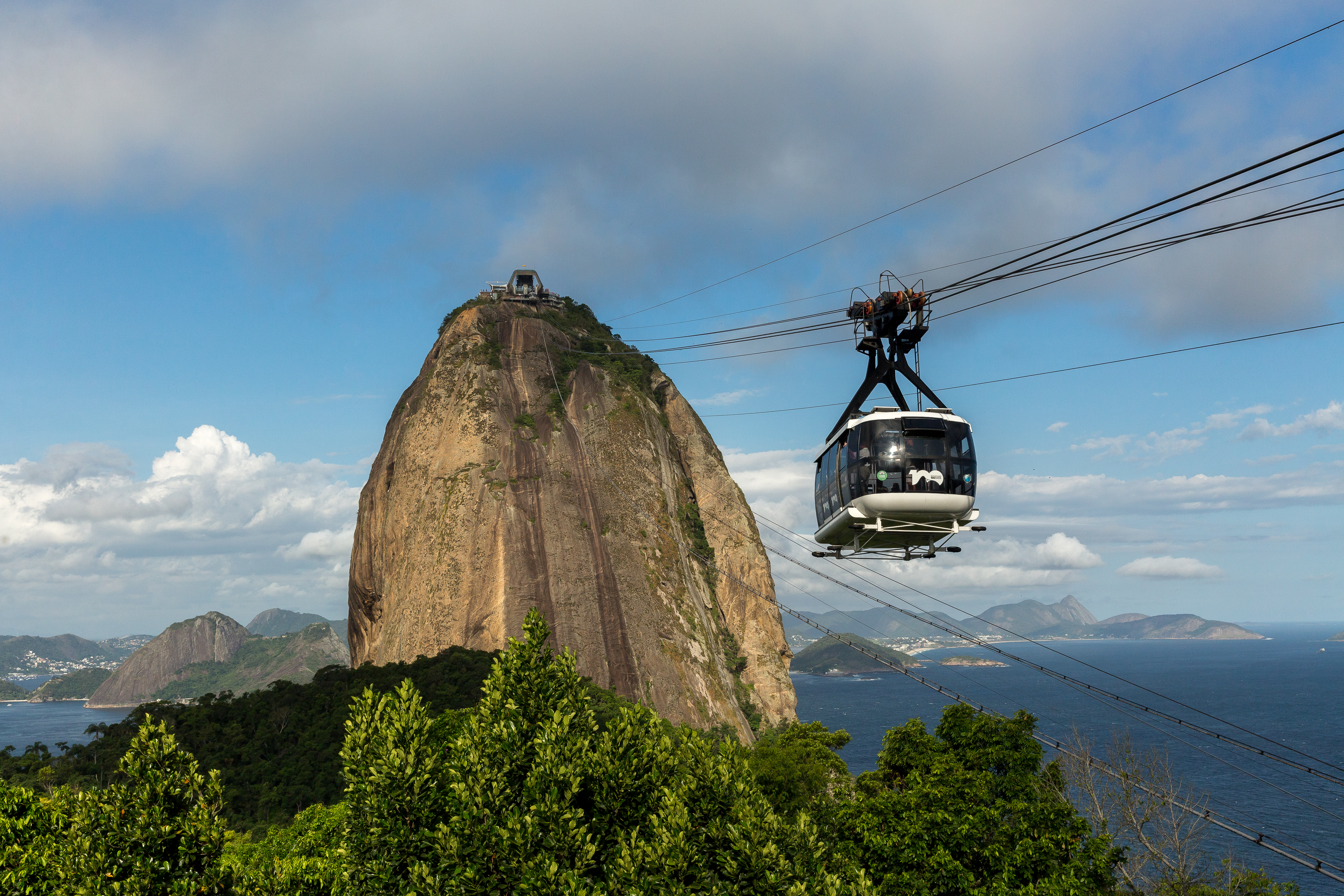
Sugarloaf Cable Car approaching the summit

Some areas within Rio de Janeiro state occasionally have falls of snow grains and ice pellets (popularly called granizo) and hail, and roughly in the same suburbs (Nova Iguaçu and surrounding areas, including parts of Campo Grande and Bangu) that correspond to the location of the March 2012, February–March 2013 and January 2015 ice pellet (granizo) falls, there was a tornado-like phenomenon in January 2011, for the first time in the region's recorded history, causing structural damage and long-lasting blackouts, but no fatalities. The World Meteorological Organization has advised that Brazil, especially its southeastern region, must be prepared for increasingly severe weather occurrences in the near future, since events such as the catastrophic January 2011 Rio de Janeiro floods and mudslides are not an isolated phenomenon. In early May 2013, winds registering above 90 km/h (56 mph) caused blackouts in 15 neighborhoods of the city and three surrounding municipalities, and killed one person. Rio saw similarly high winds (about 100 km/h (62 mph)) in January 2015.

According to data from the Brazilian National Institute of Meteorology (INMET), since 1931, the absolute minimum temperature recorded in Rio de Janeiro was 6.4 °C on 18 August 1933, at the meteorological station in the Bangu neighborhood (deactivated in March 2004). This same station, located in the city's hottest neighborhood, recorded a maximum temperature of 43.1 °C on 14 January 1984, which held the record for the highest temperature in the city until 26 December 2012, when 43.2 °C was recorded at the Santa Cruz station. The record for rainfall within 24 hours is 349.4 mm, recorded on 26 February 1971, at the former station in the Engenho de Dentro neighborhood.

Climate data for Rio de Janeiro (Saúde), elevation 11 m (36 ft), (1981–2010 normals, extremes 1961–1990)
Month	Jan	Feb	Mar	Apr	May	Jun	Jul	Aug	Sep	Oct	Nov	Dec	Year
Record high °C (°F)	40.9 (105.6)	41.8 (107.2)	41.0 (105.8)	39.3 (102.7)	36.3 (97.3)	35.9 (96.6)	34.9 (94.8)	38.9 (102.0)	40.6 (105.1)	42.8 (109.0)	40.5 (104.9)	43.2 (109.8)	43.2 (109.8)
Mean daily maximum °C (°F)	31.5 (88.7)	32.2 (90.0)	31.2 (88.2)	30.0 (86.0)	27.8 (82.0)	26.7 (80.1)	26.4 (79.5)	27.0 (80.6)	26.7 (80.1)	28.2 (82.8)	29.4 (84.9)	30.3 (86.5)	29.0 (84.2)
Daily mean °C (°F)	27.8 (82.0)	28.3 (82.9)	27.6 (81.7)	26.5 (79.7)	24.3 (75.7)	23.0 (73.4)	22.6 (72.7)	23.1 (73.6)	23.2 (73.8)	24.7 (76.5)	25.9 (78.6)	26.8 (80.2)	25.3 (77.5)
Mean daily minimum °C (°F)	24.1 (75.4)	24.4 (75.9)	24.0 (75.2)	23.0 (73.4)	20.7 (69.3)	19.3 (66.7)	18.7 (65.7)	19.1 (66.4)	19.6 (67.3)	21.1 (70.0)	22.3 (72.1)	23.2 (73.8)	21.6 (70.9)
Record low °C (°F)	17.7 (63.9)	18.9 (66.0)	18.6 (65.5)	16.2 (61.2)	11.1 (52.0)	11.6 (52.9)	12.2 (54.0)	10.6 (51.1)	10.2 (50.4)	10.1 (50.2)	15.1 (59.2)	17.1 (62.8)	10.1 (50.2)
Average precipitation mm (inches)	137.1 (5.40)	130.4 (5.13)	135.8 (5.35)	94.9 (3.74)	69.8 (2.75)	42.7 (1.68)	41.9 (1.65)	44.5 (1.75)	53.6 (2.11)	86.5 (3.41)	97.8 (3.85)	134.2 (5.28)	1,069.4 (42.10)
Average precipitation days (≥ 1 mm)	11	7	8	9	6	6	4	5	7	9	10	11	93
Average relative humidity (%)	79	79	80	80	80	79	77	77	79	80	79	80	79.1
Mean monthly sunshine hours	211.9	201.3	206.4	181.0	186.3	175.1	188.6	184.8	146.2	152.1	168.5	179.6	2,181.8
Source: Brazilian National Institute of Meteorology (INMET) (precipitation, humidity and sun 1961–1990)

Climate data for Rio de Janeiro (Alto da Boa Vista), elevation 347 m (1,138 ft), (1981–2010 normals)
Month	Jan	Feb	Mar	Apr	May	Jun	Jul	Aug	Sep	Oct	Nov	Dec	Year
Record high °C (°F)	37.5 (99.5)	36.5 (97.7)	36.8 (98.2)	34.8 (94.6)	33.0 (91.4)	32.9 (91.2)	32.7 (90.9)	38.5 (101.3)	37.5 (99.5)	38.5 (101.3)	37.1 (98.8)	38.5 (101.3)	38.5 (101.3)
Mean daily maximum °C (°F)	30.1 (86.2)	30.6 (87.1)	29.1 (84.4)	27.7 (81.9)	25.2 (77.4)	24.3 (75.7)	24.1 (75.4)	24.7 (76.5)	24.7 (76.5)	25.9 (78.6)	27.3 (81.1)	28.7 (83.7)	26.9 (80.4)
Mean daily minimum °C (°F)	20.7 (69.3)	20.9 (69.6)	20.2 (68.4)	18.8 (65.8)	16.8 (62.2)	15.3 (59.5)	14.8 (58.6)	15.3 (59.5)	16.1 (61.0)	17.3 (63.1)	18.6 (65.5)	19.8 (67.6)	17.9 (64.2)
Record low °C (°F)	12.0 (53.6)	15.2 (59.4)	14.5 (58.1)	11.5 (52.7)	10.2 (50.4)	6.7 (44.1)	7.3 (45.1)	8.7 (47.7)	8.1 (46.6)	10.5 (50.9)	11.4 (52.5)	10.2 (50.4)	6.7 (44.1)
Average precipitation mm (inches)	209.1 (8.23)	174.8 (6.88)	215.7 (8.49)	203.3 (8.00)	188.5 (7.42)	132.7 (5.22)	182.3 (7.18)	141.9 (5.59)	223.0 (8.78)	203.7 (8.02)	217.0 (8.54)	273.8 (10.78)	2,365.8 (93.14)
Average precipitation days (≥ 1.0 mm)	11	8	11	9	10	7	8	9	12	12	12	13	122
Source: Instituto Nacional de Meteorologia — INMET(temperature records: 06/01/1966-present)

Climate data for Rio de Janeiro (Bangu), elevation 40 m (130 ft), (1981–2010 normals)
Month	Jan	Feb	Mar	Apr	May	Jun	Jul	Aug	Sep	Oct	Nov	Dec	Year
Record high °C (°F)	43.1 (109.6)	40.8 (105.4)	41.2 (106.2)	38.9 (102.0)	36.8 (98.2)	35.7 (96.3)	36.1 (97.0)	40.2 (104.4)	42.0 (107.6)	41.6 (106.9)	41.6 (106.9)	41.1 (106.0)	43.1 (109.6)
Mean daily maximum °C (°F)	33.9 (93.0)	34.8 (94.6)	33.0 (91.4)	31.5 (88.7)	29.0 (84.2)	28.2 (82.8)	27.5 (81.5)	28.4 (83.1)	28.3 (82.9)	29.9 (85.8)	31.5 (88.7)	32.8 (91.0)	30.7 (87.3)
Mean daily minimum °C (°F)	23.8 (74.8)	24.0 (75.2)	23.2 (73.8)	21.7 (71.1)	19.3 (66.7)	17.8 (64.0)	17.1 (62.8)	17.7 (63.9)	18.6 (65.5)	20.3 (68.5)	21.7 (71.1)	22.9 (73.2)	20.7 (69.3)
Record low °C (°F)	16.9 (62.4)	17.2 (63.0)	17.2 (63.0)	12.5 (54.5)	11.3 (52.3)	8.7 (47.7)	9.0 (48.2)	10.4 (50.7)	11.0 (51.8)	12.4 (54.3)	11.4 (52.5)	14.0 (57.2)	8.7 (47.7)
Average precipitation mm (inches)	204.9 (8.07)	148.7 (5.85)	155.7 (6.13)	108.7 (4.28)	74.8 (2.94)	56.4 (2.22)	43.5 (1.71)	38.8 (1.53)	81.2 (3.20)	80.9 (3.19)	105.0 (4.13)	152.4 (6.00)	1,251 (49.3)
Average precipitation days (≥ 1.0 mm)	12	9	10	7	7	5	5	5	9	9	9	11	98
Source: Instituto Nacional de Meteorologia — INMET (temperature records of 1961-01-01 to 2004-03-27)

Climate data for Rio de Janeiro (Realengo), elevation 42 m (138 ft), (1981–2010 normals)
Month	Jan	Feb	Mar	Apr	May	Jun	Jul	Aug	Sep	Oct	Nov	Dec	Year
Record high °C (°F)	40.5 (104.9)	40.3 (104.5)	39.5 (103.1)	38.0 (100.4)	35.6 (96.1)	35.4 (95.7)	35.5 (95.9)	38.5 (101.3)	40.6 (105.1)	42.0 (107.6)	40.3 (104.5)	41.5 (106.7)	42.0 (107.6)
Mean daily maximum °C (°F)	32.6 (90.7)	33.3 (91.9)	32.5 (90.5)	30.8 (87.4)	28.1 (82.6)	27.7 (81.9)	26.9 (80.4)	28.0 (82.4)	28.0 (82.4)	29.2 (84.6)	30.4 (86.7)	31.3 (88.3)	29.9 (85.8)
Mean daily minimum °C (°F)	23.5 (74.3)	23.5 (74.3)	23.1 (73.6)	21.3 (70.3)	18.4 (65.1)	16.8 (62.2)	16.4 (61.5)	17.4 (63.3)	18.2 (64.8)	20.0 (68.0)	21.3 (70.3)	22.6 (72.7)	20.2 (68.4)
Record low °C (°F)	17.8 (64.0)	16.9 (62.4)	17.3 (63.1)	13.7 (56.7)	12.2 (54.0)	9.0 (48.2)	8.5 (47.3)	9.8 (49.6)	10.0 (50.0)	11.6 (52.9)	13.2 (55.8)	16.5 (61.7)	8.5 (47.3)
Average precipitation mm (inches)	169.4 (6.67)	113.4 (4.46)	137.8 (5.43)	92.4 (3.64)	52.8 (2.08)	32.8 (1.29)	43.7 (1.72)	26.6 (1.05)	48.1 (1.89)	82.2 (3.24)	111.7 (4.40)	163.9 (6.45)	1,074.8 (42.31)
Average precipitation days (≥ 1.0 mm)	12	9	10	7	7	5	5	5	9	9	9	11	98
Source: Instituto Nacional de Meteorologia — INMET (temperature records of 1971-04-01 to 1976-10-31, 1986-06-01 to 1986-11-30 and 1999-01-01 to present)

Climate data for Rio de Janeiro (Santa Cruz), elevation 63 m (207 ft), (1981–2010 normals)
Month	Jan	Feb	Mar	Apr	May	Jun	Jul	Aug	Sep	Oct	Nov	Dec	Year
Record high °C (°F)	42.5 (108.5)	41.5 (106.7)	40.1 (104.2)	38.5 (101.3)	36.0 (96.8)	35.2 (95.4)	36.0 (96.8)	39.1 (102.4)	41.2 (106.2)	41.2 (106.2)	40.5 (104.9)	43.2 (109.8)	43.2 (109.8)
Mean daily maximum °C (°F)	32.7 (90.9)	33.6 (92.5)	32.3 (90.1)	30.8 (87.4)	28.2 (82.8)	27.6 (81.7)	26.7 (80.1)	27.7 (81.9)	27.4 (81.3)	28.7 (83.7)	30.0 (86.0)	31.2 (88.2)	29.7 (85.5)
Mean daily minimum °C (°F)	22.9 (73.2)	23.1 (73.6)	22.6 (72.7)	21.4 (70.5)	19.1 (66.4)	18.0 (64.4)	17.3 (63.1)	17.8 (64.0)	18.5 (65.3)	19.7 (67.5)	20.9 (69.6)	22.0 (71.6)	20.3 (68.5)
Record low °C (°F)	16.9 (62.4)	17.8 (64.0)	16.4 (61.5)	13.2 (55.8)	12.0 (53.6)	9.0 (48.2)	9.7 (49.5)	11.6 (52.9)	11.3 (52.3)	13.3 (55.9)	14.6 (58.3)	16.1 (61.0)	9.0 (48.2)
Average precipitation mm (inches)	143.8 (5.66)	100.1 (3.94)	110.6 (4.35)	101.3 (3.99)	67.7 (2.67)	48.0 (1.89)	52.2 (2.06)	36.7 (1.44)	71.4 (2.81)	76.7 (3.02)	92.8 (3.65)	138.9 (5.47)	1,040.2 (40.95)
Average precipitation days (≥ 1.0 mm)	11	8	9	7	7	5	6	6	8	8	9	11	95
Source: Instituto Nacional de Meteorologia — INMET (temperature records of 1963-01-01 to 1994-10-16 and 1998-05-04 to present)

== Demographics ==
Historical population
Year	Pop.	±%
1872	274,972	—
1890	522,651	+90.1%
1900	811,443	+55.3%
1920	1,157,873	+42.7%
1940	1,764,141	+52.4%
1950	2,377,451	+34.8%
1960	3,281,908	+38.0%
1970	4,251,918	+29.6%
1980	5,090,700	+19.7%
1991	5,336,179	+4.8%
2000	5,851,914	+9.7%
2010	6,320,446	+8.0%
2022	6,211,223	−1.7%

According to the 2010 IBGE Census, there were 5,940,224 people residing in the city of Rio de Janeiro. Since 1960, when it was surpassed by São Paulo, the city of Rio de Janeiro has been the second-most populous city in Brazil.

=== Ethnic groups ===
The 2022 census revealed the following numbers: White Brazilian (45.4% or 2,821,619); Mixed (38.7% or 2,403,895); Black (15.6% or 968,428); Asian (10,514 or 0.2%); Indigenous (6,531 or 0.1%). The population of Rio de Janeiro was 53.2% female and 46.8% male.

The black community was formed by residents whose ancestors had been trafficked into slavery, mostly from Angola and Mozambique, as well as by people of Angolan, Mozambican and West African descent who moved to Rio from other parts of Brazil. Nearly half of the city's population is of mixed or black phenotype. White in Brazil is defined more by having a European-looking phenotype rather than ancestry, and two full siblings can be of different "racial" categories in a skin color and phenotype continuum from pálido (branco) or fair-skinned, through branco moreno or swarthy Caucasian, mestiço claro or lighter skinned multiracial, pardo (mixed race) to negro or black. Pardo, for example, in popular usage includes those who are caboclos (mestizos), mulatos (mulattoes), cafuzos (zambos), juçaras (archaic term for tri-racials) and westernized Amerindians (which are called caboclos as well), being more of a skin color rather than a racial group in particular.

=== Immigration and migration ===
Race and ethnicity in Rio de Janeiro
Ethnicity	Percentage
White	45.4%
Pardo (Multiracial)	38.7%
Black	15.6%
Asian	0.2%
Amerindian	0.1%

Different ethnic groups contributed to the formation of the population of Rio de Janeiro. Before European colonization, there were at least seven different indigenous peoples speaking 20 languages in the region. Some of them joined the Portuguese and the other the French. The Portuguese then exterminated those who joined the French, while the other part was assimilated.

Rio de Janeiro is home to the largest Portuguese population outside of Lisbon in Portugal. After independence from Portugal, Rio de Janeiro became a destination for hundreds of thousands of immigrants from Portugal, mainly in the early 20th century. The immigrants were mostly poor peasants who subsequently found prosperity in Rio as city workers and small traders.

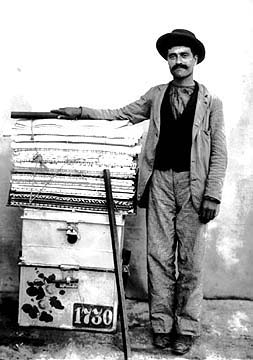
Portuguese immigrant in Rio de Janeiro, considered the largest "Portuguese city" outside Portugal

The Portuguese cultural influence is still seen in many parts of the city (and many other parts of the state of Rio de Janeiro), including architecture and language. Most Brazilians with some cultural contact with Rio know how to easily differentiate between the local dialect, Carioca , and other Brazilian dialects. People of Portuguese ancestry predominate in most of the state. The Brazilian census of 1920 showed that 39.7% of the Portuguese who lived in Brazil lived in Rio de Janeiro. Including all of Rio de Janeiro, the proportion rose to 46.3% of the Portuguese who lived in Brazil. The numerical presence of the Portuguese was extremely high, accounting for 72% of the foreigners who lived in the capital. Portuguese-born people accounted for 20.4% of the population of Rio, and those with a Portuguese father or a Portuguese mother accounted for 30.8%. In other words, native born Portuguese and their children accounted for 51.2% of the inhabitants of Rio, or a total of 267,664 people in 1890.

Rio de Janeiro city (1890)
Group	Population	Percentage
Portuguese immigrants	106,461	20.4%
Brazilians with at least one Portuguese parent	161,203	30.8%
Portuguese immigrants and their descendants	267,664	51.2%

As a result of the influx of immigrants to Brazil from the late 19th to the early 20th century, also found in Rio de Janeiro and its metropolitan area are communities of Levantine Arabs who are mostly Christian or Irreligious, Spaniards, Italians, Germans, Japanese,

Genomic ancestry of non-related individuals in Rio de Janeiro
Race or skin color	Number of individuals	Amerindian	African	European
White	107	6.7%	6.9%	86.4%
Pardo (Mixed race)	119	8.3%	23.6%	68.1%
Black	109	7.3%	50.9%	41.8%

According to an autosomal DNA study from 2009, conducted on a school in the poor suburb of Rio de Janeiro, the "pardos" there were found to be on average about 80% European, and the "whites" (who thought of themselves as "very mixed") were found to carry very little Amerindian and/or African admixtures. The results of the tests of genomic ancestry are quite different from the self-made estimates of European ancestry. In general, the test results showed that European ancestry is far more important than the students thought it would be. The "pardos" for example thought of themselves as 1/3 European, 1/3 African and 1/3 Amerindian before the tests, and yet their ancestry on average reached 80% European. Other studies showed similar results

=== Religion ===
Religion in Rio de Janeiro (2010 Census)
Religion	Percent
Roman Catholicism	51.1%
Protestantism	23.4%
Other Christian	2.4%
No religion	13.6%
Spiritism	5.9%
Others	3.6%

Religion in Rio de Janeiro is diverse, with Catholic Christianity being the majority religion. According to data from the Brazilian Institute of Geography and Statistics (IBGE), in 2010 the population of Rio de Janeiro had 3,229,192 Roman Catholics (51.1%), 1,477,021 Protestants (23.4%), 372.851 Spiritists (5.9%), 37,974 Jehovah's Witnesses (0.6%), 75,075 Buddhists (0.2%), 52,213 Umbanda (0.8%), 21,800 Jews (0.3%), 25,743 Brazilian Catholic Apostolic Church (0.4%), 16,776 new eastern religious (0.2%), 28,843 Candomblé (0.4%), 3,853 Mormons (<0.1%), 5,751 Eastern Orthodox Christians (<0.1%), 7,394 spiritualists (0.1%), 964 Muslims (<0.1%), 5,662 esoteric (<0.1%) and 802 Hindus (<0.1%). 858,704 had no religion (13.5%), and 113,530 followed other forms of Christianity (1.8%).

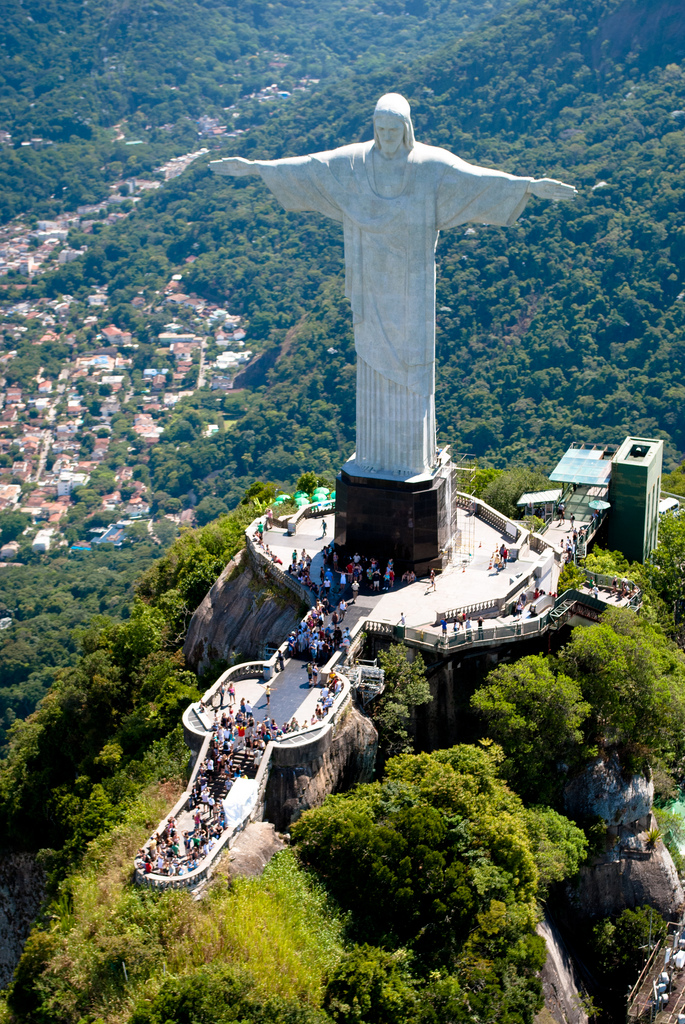
Christ the Redeemer

Rio de Janeiro has had a rich and influential Catholic tradition. The Roman Catholic Archdiocese of São Sebastião do Rio de Janeiro is the second largest archdiocese in Brazil after São Paulo. The Rio de Janeiro Cathedral was inaugurated in 1979, in the central region of the city. Its installations have a collection of great historical and religious value: the Archdiocesan Museum of Sacred Art and the Archdiocesan Archive. In a Contemporary architecture, it has a conical shape, with 96 meters of internal diameter and capacity to receive up to 20 thousand faithful. The splendor of the building, with straight and sober lines, is due to the changing stained glass windows carved on the walls up to the dome. Its design and execution was coordinated by Monsignor Ivo Antônio Calliari (1918–2005). Saint Sebastian is recognized as the city's patron saint, which is why it received the canonical name of "Saint Sebastian of Rio de Janeiro".

Many Protestant creeds coexist in the city, Presbyterian, Congregational, Lutheran and Anglican Churches, in addition to evangelical churches such as the Baptist, Methodist, Seventh-day Adventist, and Pentecostal churches, such as the Universal Church of the Kingdom of God, Assembly of God, Christian Congregation in Brazil, and The Foursquare Church.

Afro-Brazilian religions such as Umbanda and Candomblé find support in various social segments, although professed by less than 2% of the population, many Cariocas simultaneously observe those practices with Roman Catholicism.

==== Christianity ====
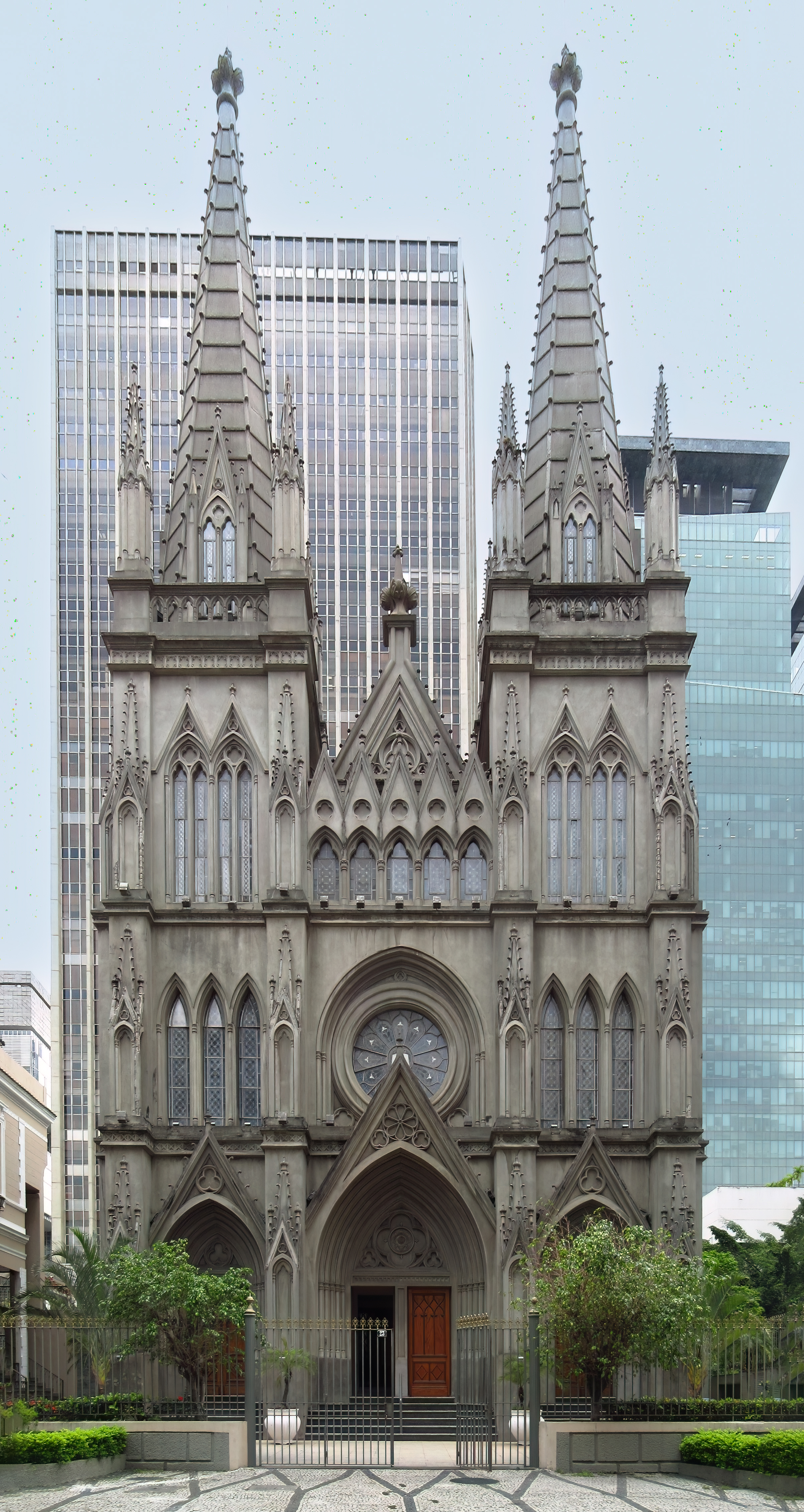
Presbyterian Cathedral of Rio de Janeiro

The Roman Catholic Archdiocese of São Sebastião do Rio de Janeiro, the Metropolitan See of its respective Ecclesiastical Province, belongs to the Regional Episcopal Council Leste I of the National Conference of Bishops of Brazil (CNBB) (headquartered in Rio until 1977). Founded in 1676, it covers a territory of 1,721 km^{2}.

The Cathedral of São Sebastião do Rio de Janeiro, or Metropolitan Cathedral, was inaugurated in 1979 in the central region of the city. Its facilities house a collection of great historical and religious value: the Archdiocesan Museum of Sacred Art and the Archdiocesan Archive. The Banco da Providência and the Archdiocesan Caritas are also based there. In a contemporary architectural style, it has a conical shape, with an internal diameter of 96 meters and a capacity to hold up to 20,000 worshippers. The splendor of the building, with its straight and sober lines, is due to the changing stained glass windows carved into the walls up to the dome. Its design and execution were coordinated by Monsignor Ivo Antônio Calliari (1918–2005).

The city is home to various Protestant or reformed denominations, exemplified by the Presbyterian, Congregational, Lutheran, and Anglican churches. There are also evangelical churches such as the Baptist, Methodist, Seventh-day Adventist churches, and those of Pentecostal origin: Universal Church of the Kingdom of God, Assembly of God, Christian Congregation in Brazil, Foursquare Gospel, House of Blessing, God is Love Pentecostal Church, Christian Maranatha, and New Life.

=== Education ===
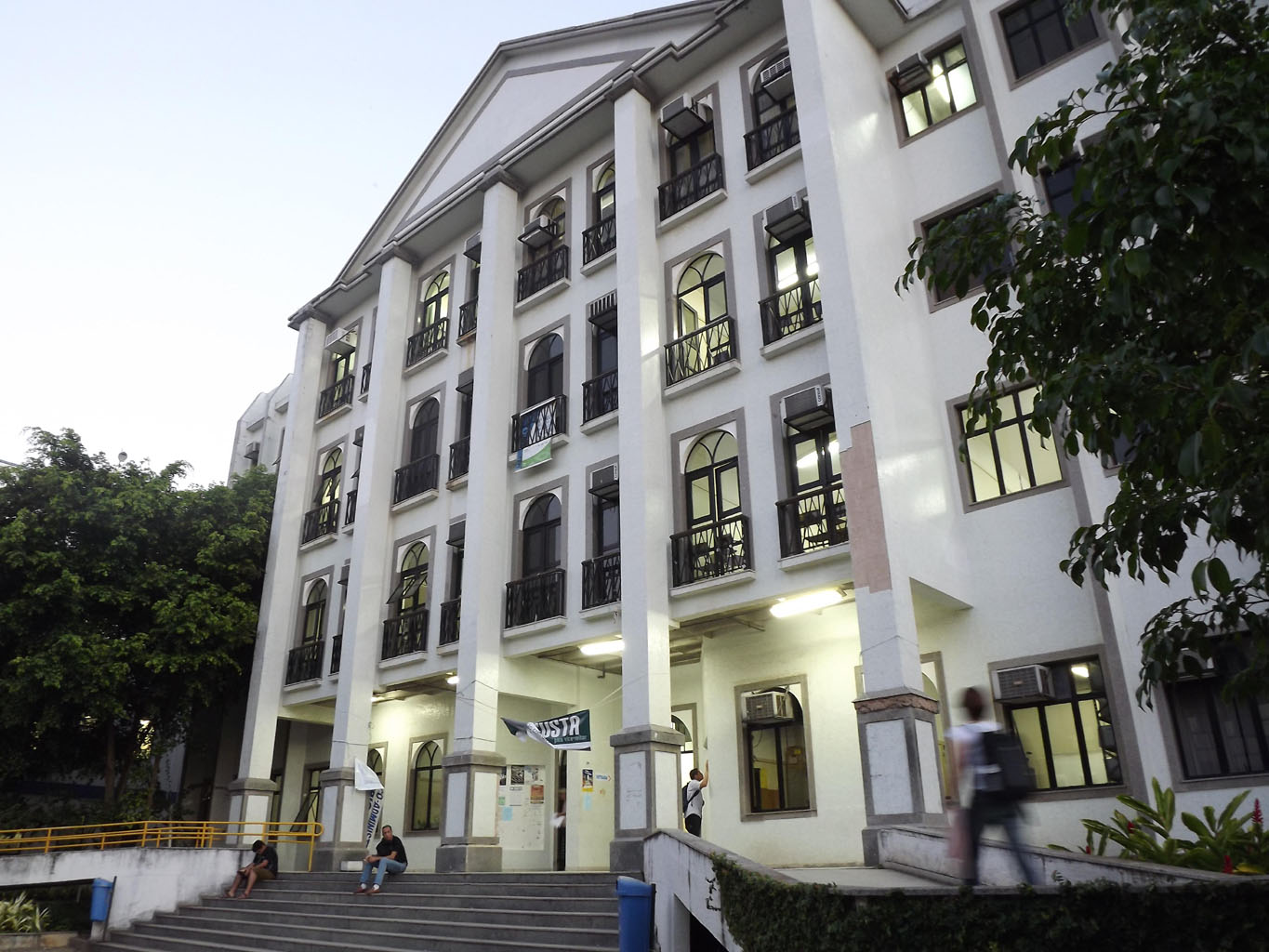
Center for Human Science of the Federal University of the State of Rio de Janeiro

The Portuguese language is the official and national language, and thus the primary language taught in schools. English and Spanish are also part of the official curriculum. There are also international schools, such as the American School of Rio de Janeiro, Our Lady of Mercy School, SIS Swiss International School, the Corcovado German School, the Lycée Français and the British School of Rio de Janeiro.

The city has several universities and research institutes. The Ministry of Education has certified approximately 99 upper-learning institutions in Rio. The most prestigious university is the Federal University of Rio de Janeiro. It is the fifth-best in Latin America; the second-best in Brazil, second only to the University of São Paulo; and the best in Latin America, according to the QS World University Rankings.

Some notable higher education institutions are Federal University of Rio de Janeiro (UFRJ); Federal University of the State of Rio de Janeiro (UNIRIO); Rio de Janeiro State University (UERJ); Federal Rural University of Rio de Janeiro (UFRRJ, often nicknamed Rural); Fluminense Federal University (UFF); Pontifical Catholic University of Rio de Janeiro (PUC-Rio); Getúlio Vargas Foundation (FGV); Military Institute of Engineering (IME); Superior Institute of Technology in Computer Science of Rio de Janeiro (IST-Rio); College of Publicity and Marketing (ESPM); The Brazilian Center for Research in Physics (CBPF); National Institute of Pure and Applied Mathematics (IMPA); Superior institute of Education of Rio de Janeiro (ISERJ) and Federal Center of Technological Education Celso Suckow da Fonseca (CEFET/RJ). There are more than 137 upper-learning institutions in whole Rio de Janeiro state.

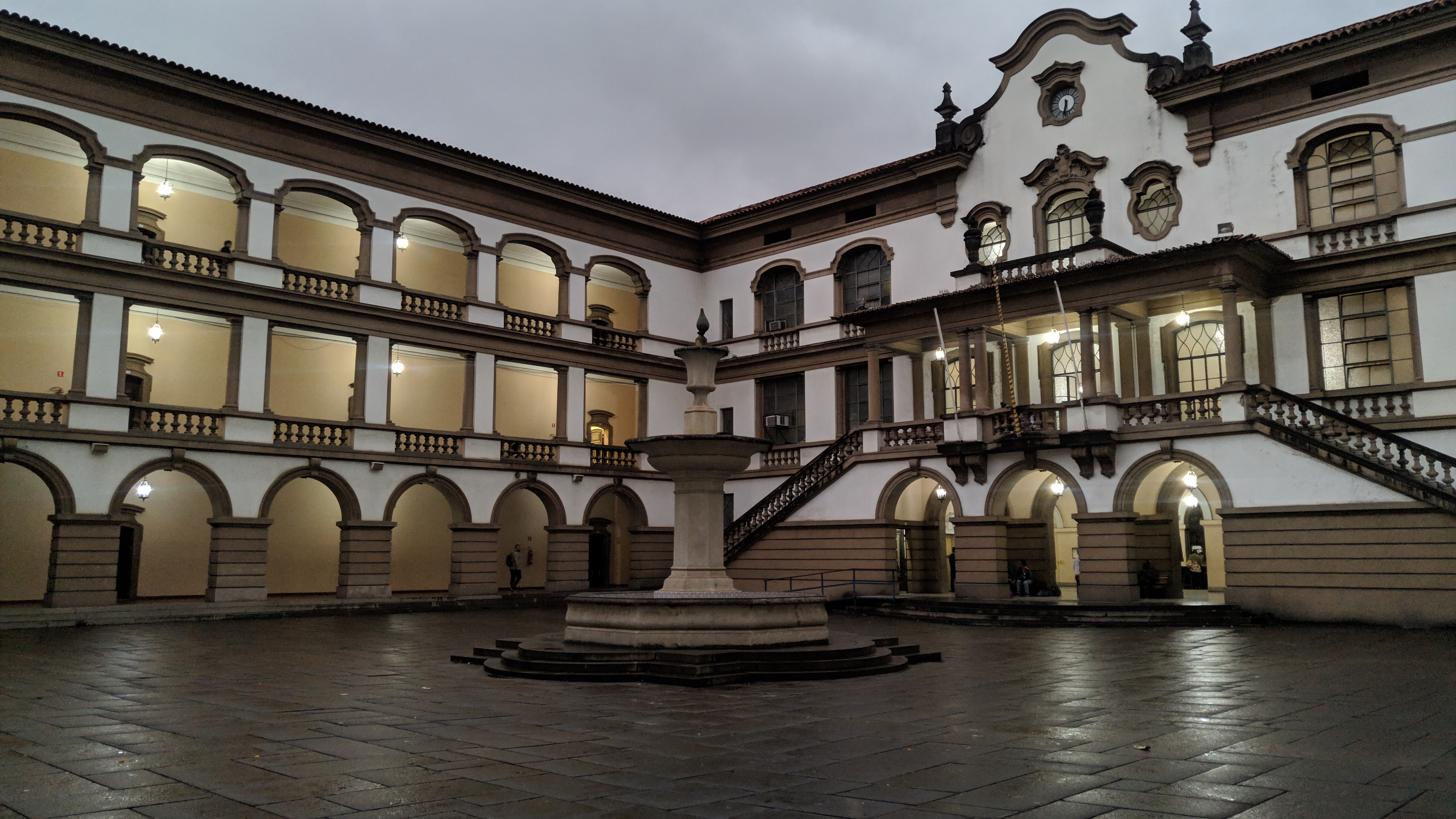
Superior institute of Education of Rio de Janeiro (ISERJ)

The Rio de Janeiro State University (public), Federal University of Rio de Janeiro (public), Brazilian Institute of Capital Markets (private) and Pontifical Catholic University of Rio de Janeiro (private) are among the country's top institutions of higher education. Other institutes of higher learning include the Colégio Regina Coeli in Usina, notable for having its own 3 ft (914 mm) narrow-gauge funicular railway on its grounds.

Primary schools are largely under municipal administration, while the state plays a more significant role in the extensive network of secondary schools. There are also a small number of schools under federal administration, such as Pedro II School, Colégio de Aplicação da UFRJ, and the Centro Federal de Educação Tecnológica of Rio de Janeiro (CEFET-RJ). In addition, Rio has an ample offering of private schools that provide education at all levels. Rio is home to many colleges and universities. The literacy rate for cariocas aged 10 and older is nearly 95 percent, well above the national average. In Rio, there were 1,033 primary schools with 25,594 teachers and 667,788 students in 1995. There are 370 secondary schools with 9,699 teachers and 227,892 students. There are 53 University-preparatory schools with 14,864 teachers and 154,447 students. The city has six major universities and 47 private schools of higher learning.

=== Social issues ===
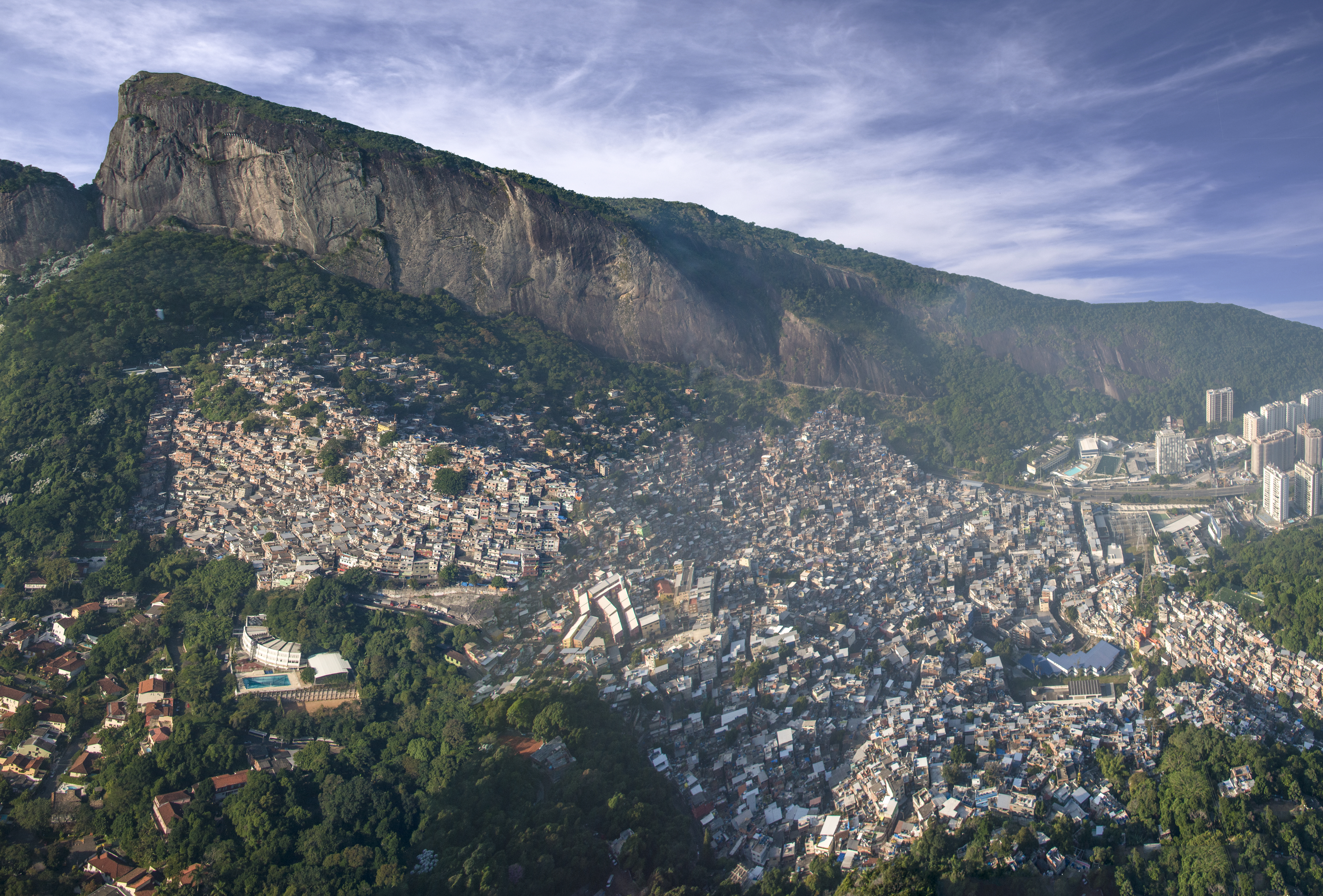
Rocinha, the largest slum (favela) in Brazil

There are significant disparities between the rich and the poor in Rio de Janeiro, and different socioeconomic groups are largely segregated into different neighborhoods. Although the city clearly ranks among the world's major metropolises, large numbers live in slums known as favelas, where 95% of the population are poor, compared to 40% in the general population.

There have been a number of government initiatives to counter this problem, from the removal of the population from favelas to housing projects such as Cidade de Deus to the more recent approach of improving conditions in the favelas and bringing them up to par with the rest of the city, as was the focus of the "Favela Bairro" program and deployment of Pacifying Police Units.

Rio has the second highest population of favela residents in Brazil, but the 11th highest proportion of its total population living in favelas. More than 1.3 million people live in its 813 favelas, 21% of Rio's total population.

Rio also has a large proportion of state-sanctioned violence, with about 20% of all killings committed by state security. In 2019, police killed an average of five people each day in the state of Rio de Janeiro, with a total of 1,810 killed in the year. This was more police killings than any year since official records started in 1998.

== Politics ==
=== Municipal government ===
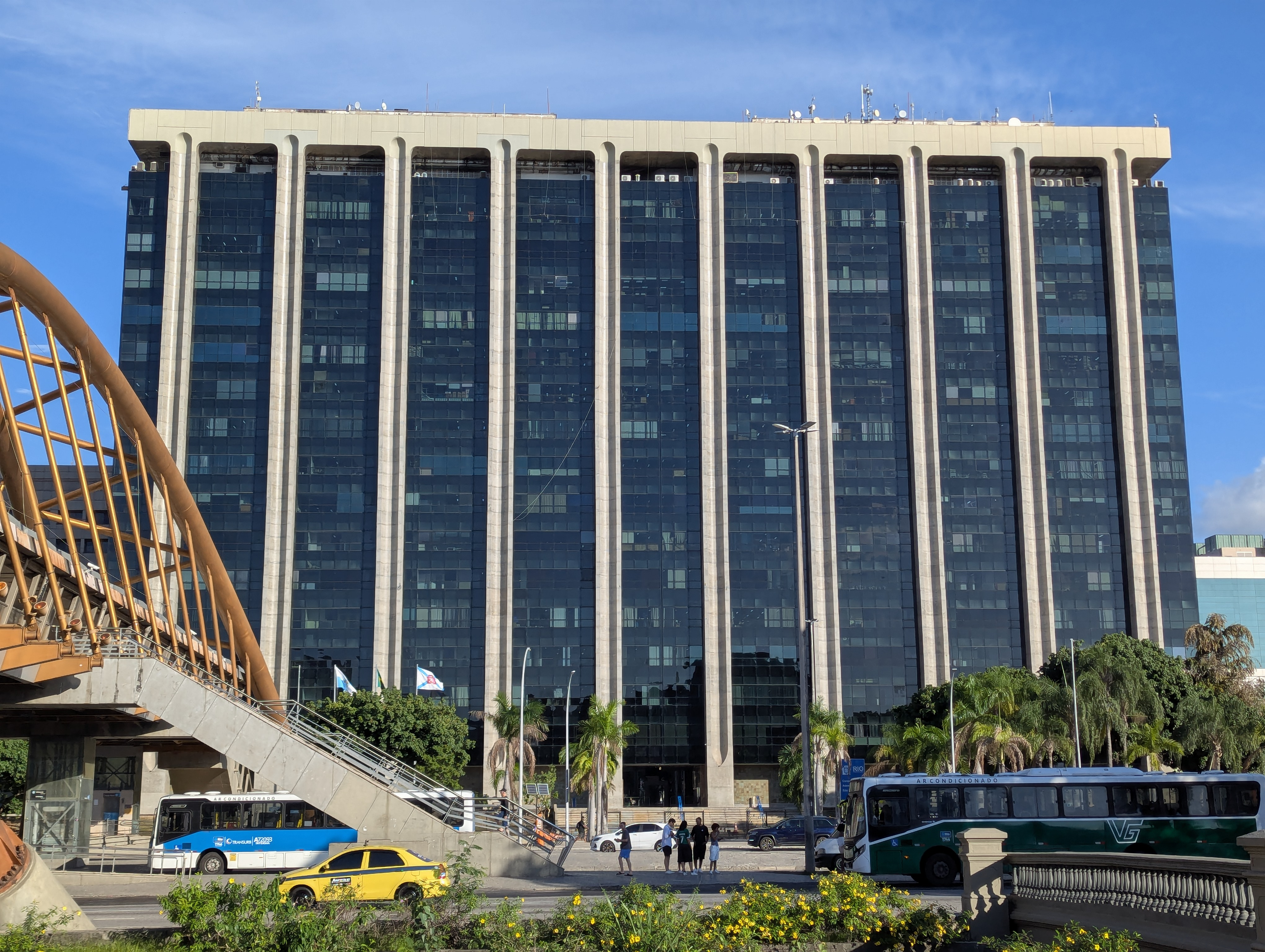
São Sebastião Administrative Center, seat of City Hall

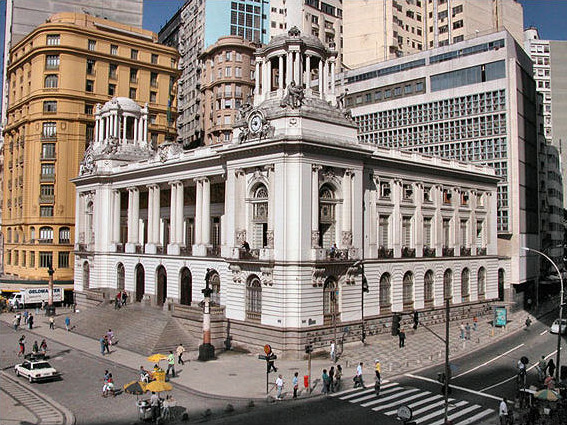
Pedro Ernesto Palace, in Cinelândia, seat of Municipal Council

In Rio de Janeiro, the executive power is represented by the mayor and the cabinet of secretaries, in accordance with the model proposed by the Federal Constitution. The Organic Law of the Municipality and the current Master Plan, however, stipulate that the public administration must provide the population with effective tools for the exercise of participatory democracy. In this way, the city is divided into subprefectures, each of which is headed by a sub-mayor appointed directly by the mayor.

Legislative power is constituted by the municipal council, composed of 51 councilors elected for four-year terms (in compliance with the provisions of article 29 of the Constitution, which disciplines a minimum number of 42 and a maximum of 55 for municipalities with more than five million inhabitants). It is up to the House to prepare and vote on fundamental laws for the administration and the Executive, especially the participatory budget (Lei de Diretrizes Orçamentárias). Although the veto power is granted to the mayor, the process of voting on the laws that oppose him usually generates conflicts between the Executive and the Legislative.

There are also municipal councils, which complement the legislative process and the work engendered in the secretariats. Compulsorily formed by representatives of various sectors of organized civil society, they are on different fronts — although their effective representation is sometimes questioned. The following are currently in operation: Municipal Council for the Protection of Cultural Heritage (CMPC), Defense of the Environment (CONDEMAM), Health (CMS), the Rights of Children and Adolescents (CMDCA), Education (CME), Social Assistance (CMAS) and Anti-Drugs.

=== State government ===
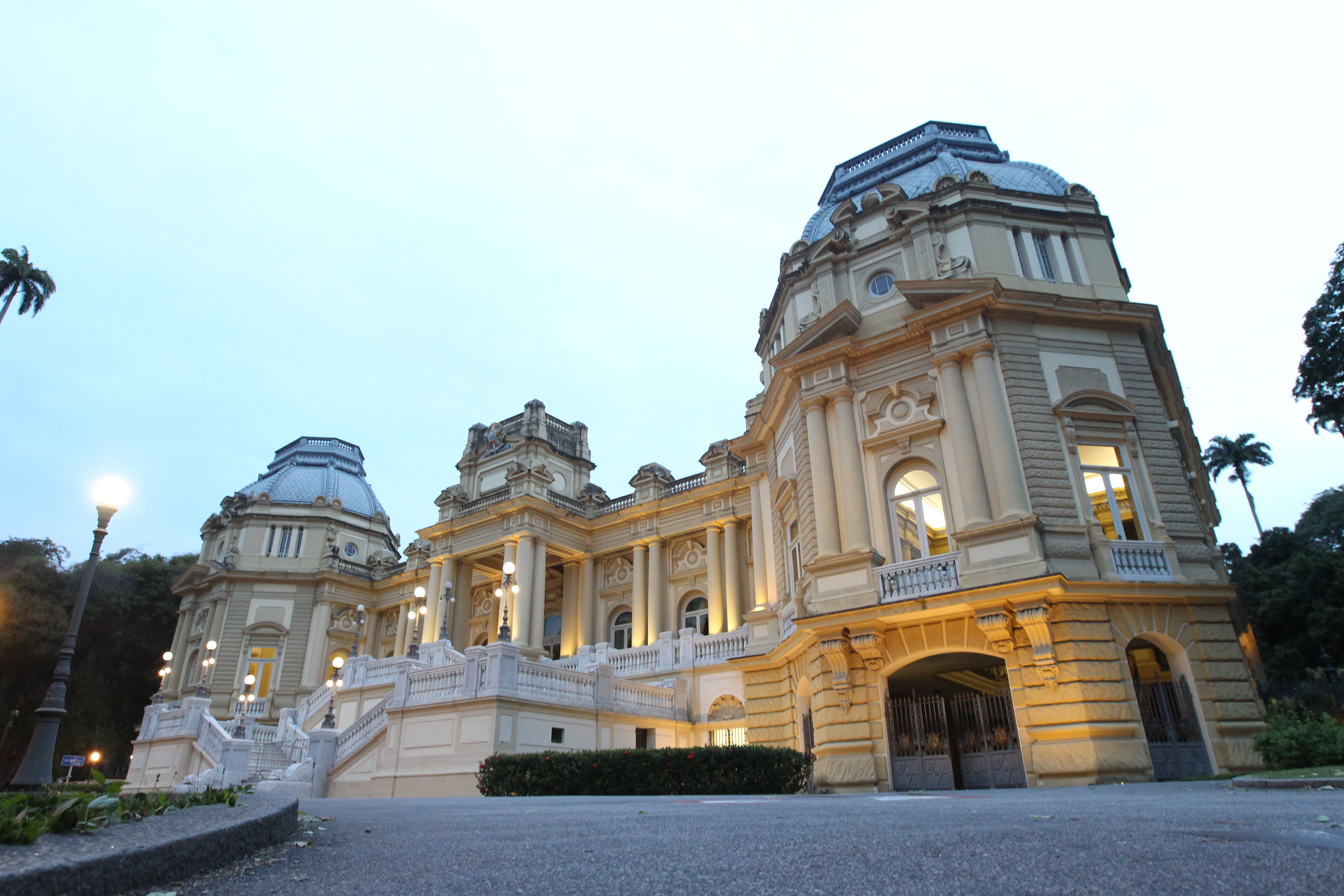
Guanabara Palace, seat of the state government

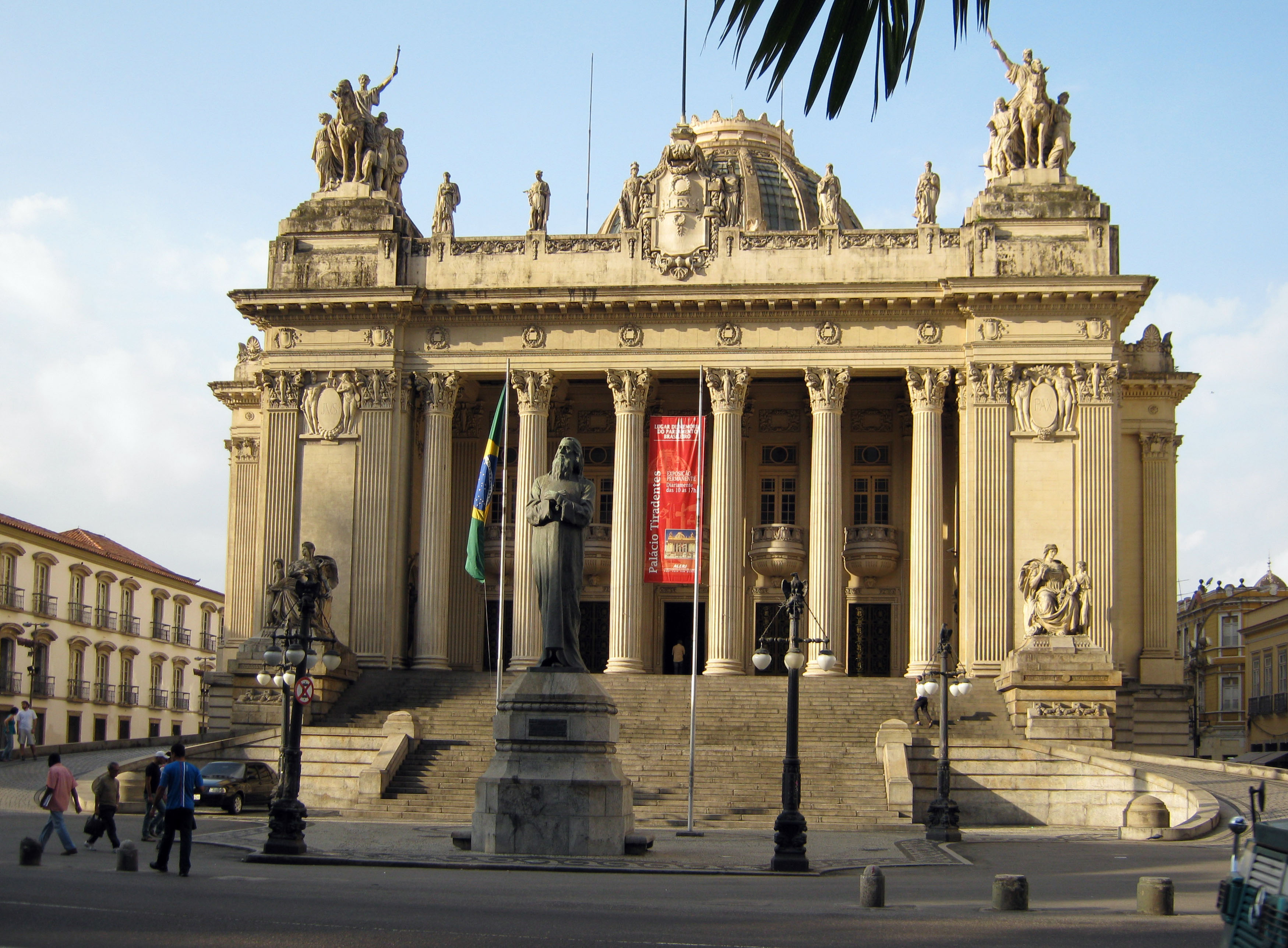
Tiradentes Palace, seat of the Legislative Assembly

As the capital of the homonymous state, the city is the seat of the state government. The Guanabara Palace (formerly known as Paço Isabel) is located in the Laranjeiras neighborhood, in the south zone, and is the official seat of the Rio de Janeiro executive power. Not to be confused with Palácio Laranjeiras, situated in the same neighborhood, which is the official residence of the governor of Rio de Janeiro.

The Legislative Assembly of Rio de Janeiro (ALERJ) is the state legislative body and is headquartered at Tiradentes Palace, where the Chamber of Deputies of Brazil previously functioned.

The Court of Justice of the State of Rio de Janeiro (TJRJ) is the highest body of the judiciary in the state. Its central court is located in downtown Rio de Janeiro, but, from 2013 to July 2018, some of the courts of this court were moved to Cidade Nova.

=== Federal government ===
The city of Rio de Janeiro was successively the capital of the Portuguese colony of the State of Brazil (1621–1815), after the United Kingdom of Portugal, Brazil and the Algarves (1815–1822), the Empire of Brazil (1822–1889) and from the Republic of the United States of Brazil (1889–1968) until 1960, when the seat of government was definitively transferred to the then newly built Brasília.

Despite the change in the federal capital, 59% of civil servants in the Executive Branch of federal agencies and public companies remained in the city. Rio de Janeiro is also the only Brazilian state where the number of federal employees exceeds the number of state employees. About a third of all federal public bodies and companies remain in the former capital, with 50 public offices, including agencies, autarchies, foundations and public companies, such as the National Library, the National Nuclear Energy Commission, Fiocruz, BNDES, Petrobras, Eletrobras, IBGE, Casa da Moeda, the National Archives, among others.

=== Subdivisions ===
Municipality of Rio de Janeiro and its division into zones and neighborhoods: West Zone / North Zone / South Zone / Central Zone

The city is commonly divided into the historic center (Centro); the tourist-friendly wealthier South Zone (Zona Sul); the residential less wealthy North Zone (Zona Norte); peripheries in the West Zone (Zona Oeste), among them Santa Cruz, Campo Grande and the wealthy newer Barra da Tijuca district. Rio de Janeiro is administratively divided into 33 distritos (districts) named Regiões Administrativas ("Administrative Regions") and 166 bairros (neighborhoods).

Subprefectures are officially grouped into four regions (or "zones"), taking into account geographic position and occupation history; however, these do not have any administrative or political power over the municipality. The official political division of the municipality takes into account historical-cultural characteristics to divide the neighborhoods. Most of its population is concentrated in the neighborhoods of Campo Grande, Santa Cruz, Bangu, Tijuca, Realengo, Jacarepaguá, Copacabana, Barra da Tijuca, Maré, Guaratiba and Taquara together, these eleven neighborhoods concentrate a population of 1.5 million inhabitants, according to the 2010 census.

Centro or Downtown is the historic core of the city, as well as its financial and commercial center. Sites of interest include the Paço Imperial, built during colonial times to serve as a residence for the Portuguese governors of Brazil; many historic churches, such as the Candelária Church (the former cathedral), São José, Santa Lucia, Nossa Senhora do Carmo, Santa Rita, São Francisco de Paula, and the monasteries of Santo Antônio and São Bento. The Centro also houses the modern concrete Rio de Janeiro Cathedral. Around the Cinelândia square, there are several landmarks of the Belle Époque of Rio, such as the Municipal Theater and the National Library building. Among its several museums, the Museu Nacional de Belas Artes (National Museum of Fine Arts) and the Museu Histórico Nacional (National Historical Museum) are the most important.

The Cultural Corridor in Rio's City Center is home to one of the most architecturally and historically preserved districts, known as the Sociedade de Amigos das Adjacências da Rua da Alfândega (SAARA). This association was formed by merchants operating near Rua da Alfândega in the Historic Center of Rio de Janeiro, Brazil. The area is renowned for its stores specializing in popular home goods and fabrics, housed within several historic buildings. The name comes from the occupation of the region by Muslim, Jewish, and Maronite Christian immigrants from the Ottoman Empire in the early 20th century, for commercial purposes. The region preserves examples of various architectural styles, from Portuguese colonial, through Neoclassical, Eclectic, Art Deco, and Modernism, making the region a rich tapestry of historical architecture that refers to the city's colonial and imperial past.

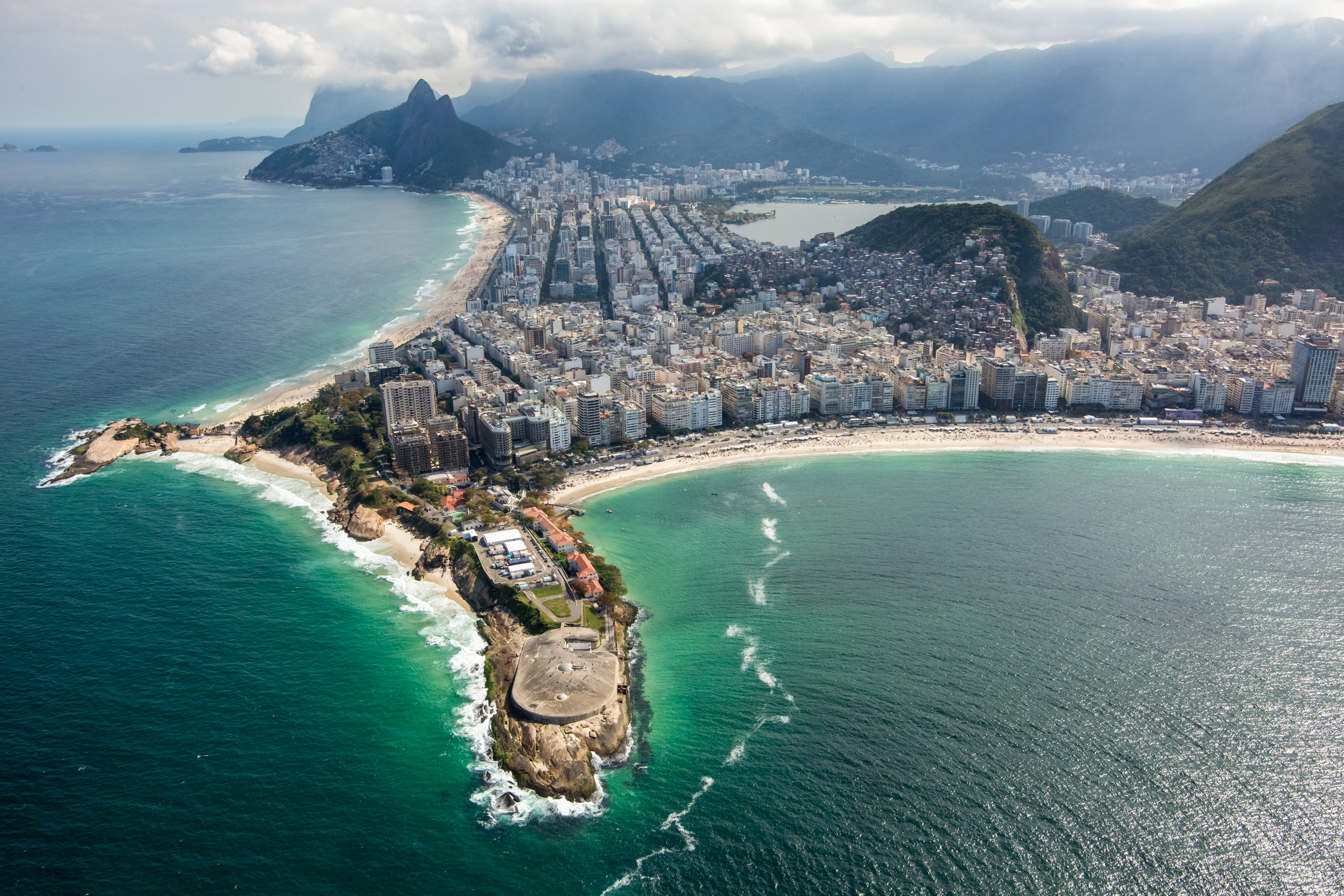
Aerial view of Fort Copacabana, with Copacabana (right) and Ipanema (left, background)

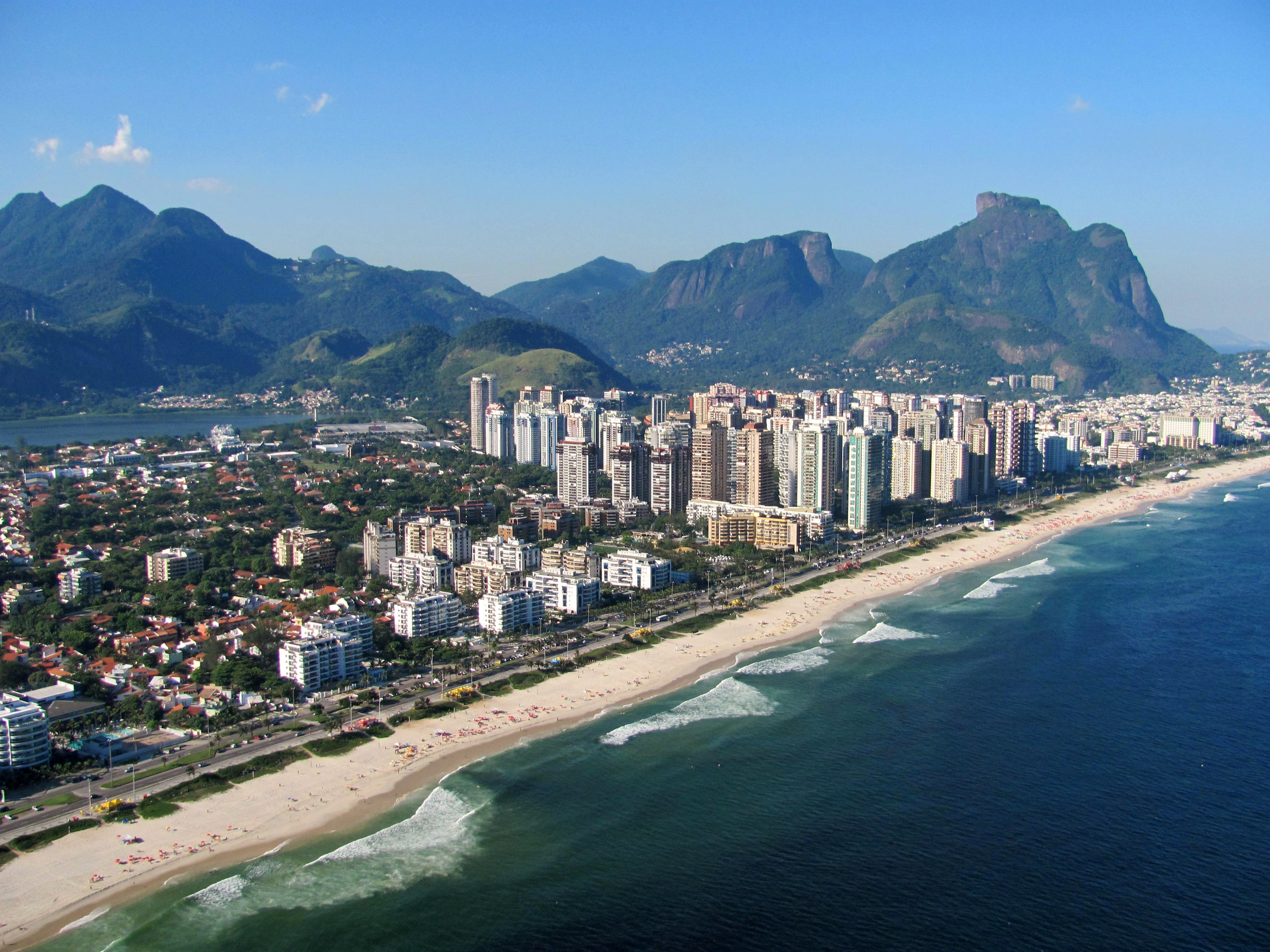
Barra da Tijuca with Pedra da Gávea in background

The South Zone (Zona Sul) is composed of several districts, among which are São Conrado, Leblon, Ipanema, Arpoador, Copacabana, and Leme, which compose Rio's Atlantic beach coastline. The neighborhood of Copacabana beach hosts one of the world's most spectacular New Year's Eve parties ("Reveillon"), as more than two million revelers crowd onto the sands to watch the fireworks display. From 2001, the fireworks have been launched from boats, to improve the safety of the event.

The North Zone (Zona Norte) begins at Grande Tijuca (the middle class residential and commercial bairro of Tijuca), just west of the city center, and sprawls for miles inland until Baixada Fluminense and the city's Northwest. This region is home to the Maracanã (located in Grande Tijuca), once the world's highest capacity football venue, able to hold nearly 199,854 people, as it did for the World Cup final of 1950. This region is also home to most of the samba schools of Rio de Janeiro, such as Mangueira, Salgueiro, Império Serrano, Unidos da Tijuca, Imperatriz Leopoldinense, among others. Some of the main neighborhoods of Rio's North Zone are Alto da Boa Vista, which shares the Tijuca Rainforest with the South and Southwest Zones; Tijuca, Vila Isabel, Méier, São Cristovão, Madureira, Penha, Manguinhos, Fundão, Olaria, among others. Many of Rio de Janeiro's slums (favelas) are located in the North Zone.

West Zone (Zona Oeste) of Rio de Janeiro is a vaguely defined area that covers some 50% of the city's entire area, including Barra da Tijuca and Recreio dos Bandeirantes neighborhoods. The West Side of Rio has many historic sites because of the old "Royal Road of Santa Cruz" that crossed the territory in the regions of Realengo, Bangu, and Campo Grande, finishing at the Royal Palace of Santa Cruz in the Santa Cruz region. The highest peak of the city of Rio de Janeiro is the Pedra Branca Peak (Pico da Pedra Branca) inside the Pedra Branca State Park. It has an altitude of 1024m. The Pedra Branca State Park (Parque Estadual da Pedra Branca) is the biggest urban state park in the world comprising 17 neighborhoods in the west side, being a "giant lung" in the city with trails, waterfalls and historic constructions like an old aqueduct in the Colônia Juliano Moreira in the neighborhood of Taquara and a dam in Camorim. Santa Cruz and Campo Grande Region have exhibited economic growth, mainly in the Campo Grande neighborhood. Industrial enterprises are being built in lower and lower middle class residential Santa Cruz, one of the largest and most populous of Rio de Janeiro's neighborhoods, most notably Ternium Brasil, a new steel mill with its own private docks on Sepetiba Bay, which is planned to be South America's largest steel works. A tunnel called Túnel da Grota Funda, opened in 2012, creating a public transit facility between Barra da Tijuca and Santa Cruz, lessening travel time to the region from other areas of Rio de Janeiro.

On 9 September 2025, many neighbourhoods that comprise the former West Zone were set apart to create the Southwest Zone (Zona Sudoeste). The Southwest Zone is compound by Anil, Barra da Tijuca, Camorim, Cidade de Deus, Curicica, Freguesia, Gardênia Azul, Grumari, Itanhangá, Jacarepaguá, Joá, Praça Seca, Pechincha, Rio das Pedras, Recreio dos Bandeirantes, Tanque, Taquara, Vargem Grande, Vargem Pequena and Vila Valqueire.

== International relations ==
=== Twin towns – sister cities ===
Rio de Janeiro is twinned with:

- Arganil, Portugal
- Atlanta, United States
- Baku, Azerbaijan
- Barcelona, Spain
- Beijing, China
- Beirut, Lebanon
- Braga, Portugal
- Brisbane, Australia
- Buenos Aires, Argentina
- Busan, South Korea
- Cape Town, South Africa
- Cebu City, Philippines
- Cologne, Germany
- Guimarães, Portugal
- Guiyang, China
- Istanbul, Turkey
- Kyiv, Ukraine
- Kobe, Japan
- Lahore, Pakistan
- Lisbon, Portugal
- Liverpool, United Kingdom
- Luanda, Angola
- M'banza Congo, Angola
- Madrid, Spain
- Montpellier, France
- Nice, France
- Nairobi, Kenya
- Oklahoma City, United States
- Olhão, Portugal
- Ramat Gan, Israel
- Ra'anana, Israel
- Saint Petersburg, Russia
- Samarkand, Uzbekistan
- Santa Comba, Spain
- Santa Cruz de Tenerife, Spain
- Tangier, Morocco
- Viana do Castelo, Portugal
- Viseu, Portugal
- Warsaw, Poland
- Jerusalem, Israel

=== Partner cities ===
Rio de Janeiro has the following partner/friendship cities:

- Berlin, Germany
- Kansas City, United States
- Moscow, Russia
- New York, United States
- Paris, France
- Philadelphia, United States
- Tokyo, Japan
- Toronto, Canada
- Yerevan, Armenia

=== Union of Ibero-American Capital Cities ===
Rio de Janeiro is a part of the Union of Ibero-American Capital Cities.

== Economy ==
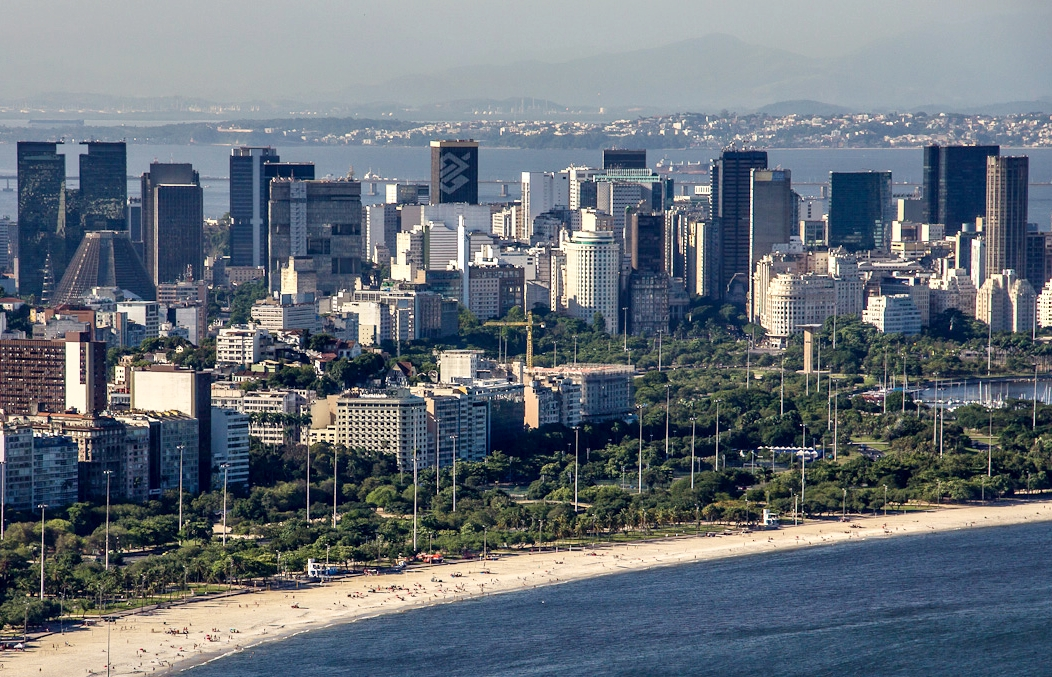
Downtown Rio, in the financial district of the city

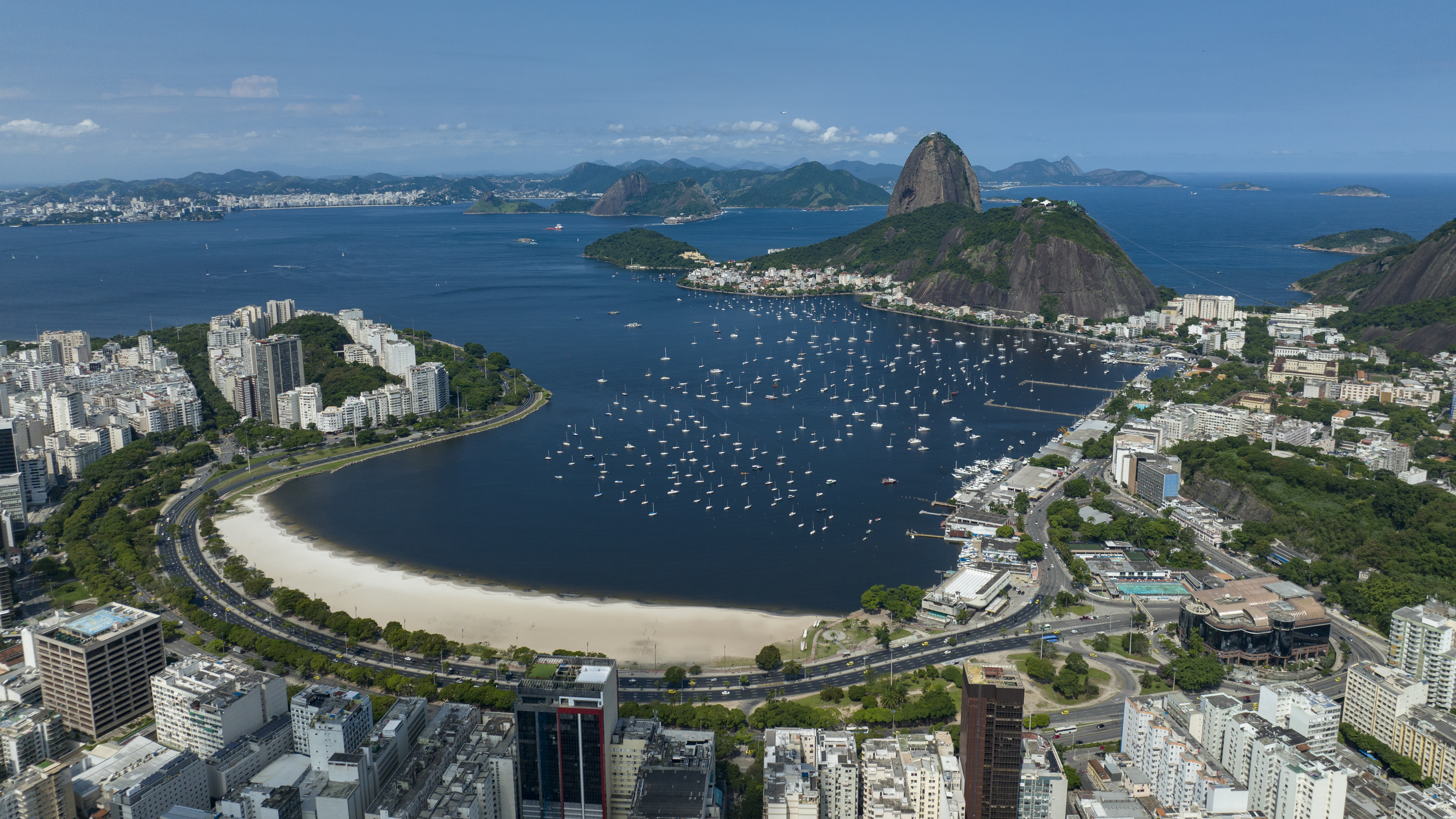
Botafogo with the Sugarloaf Mountain

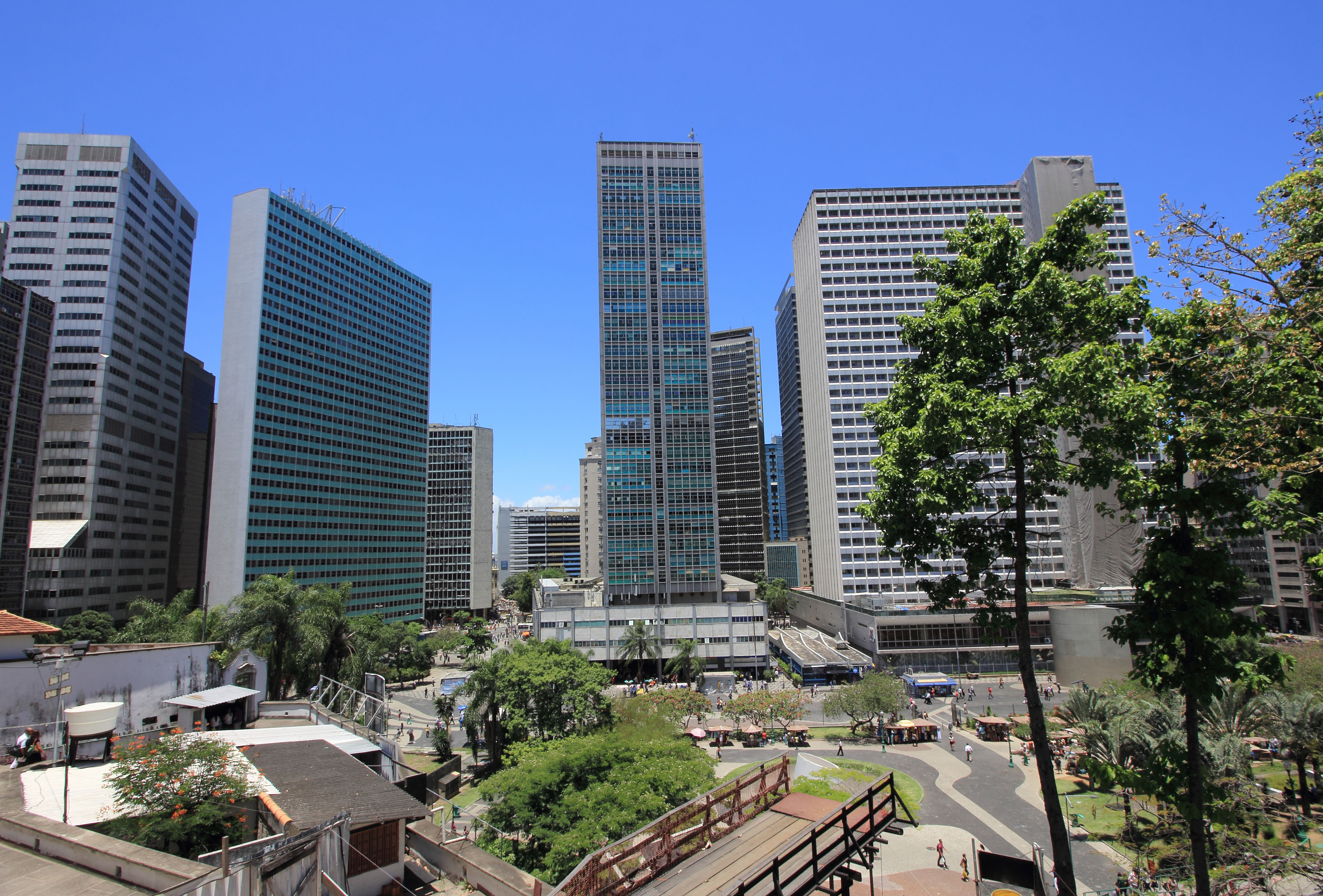
Largo da Carioca, in Downtown Rio

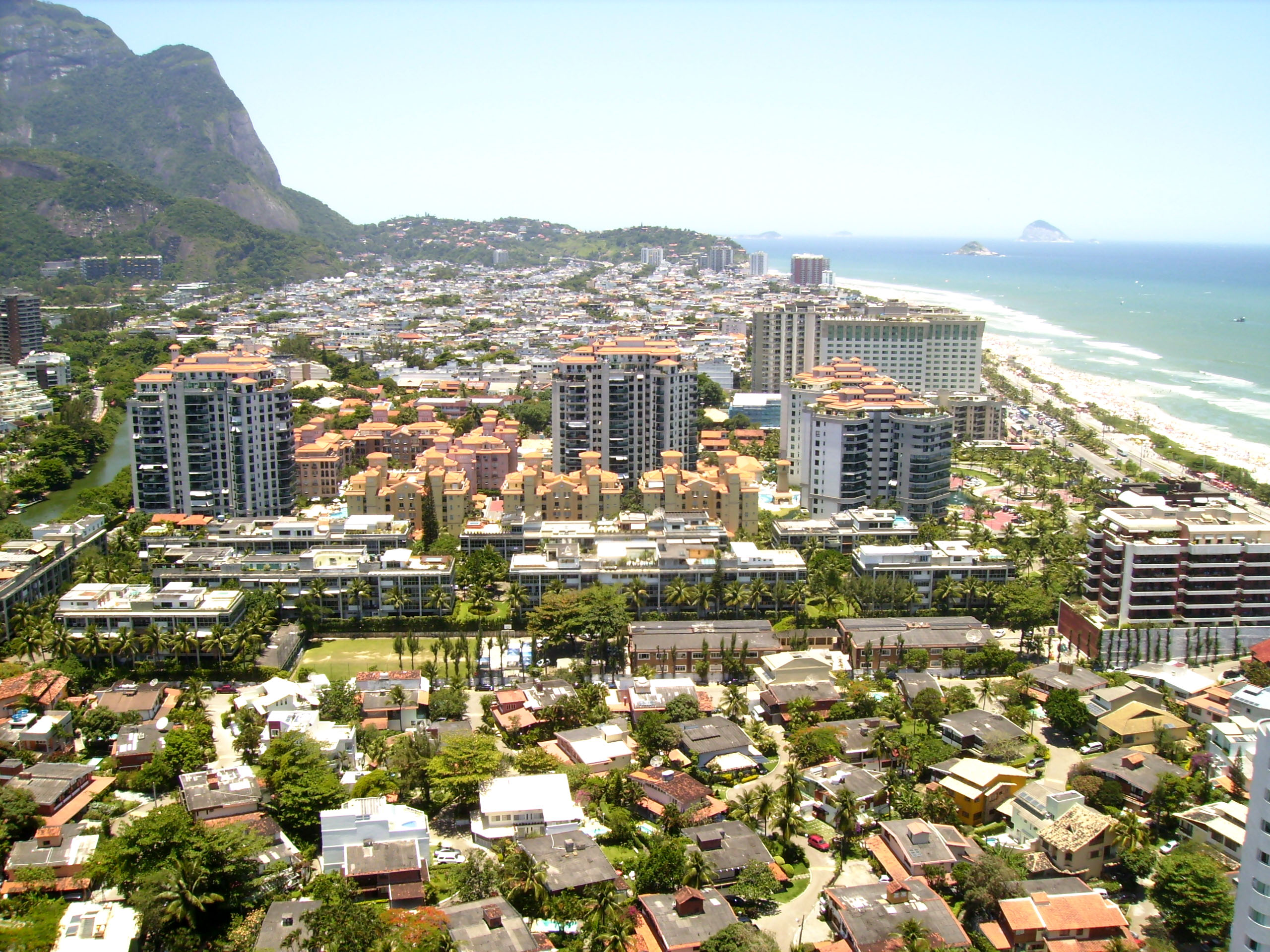
Barra da Tijuca

Rio de Janeiro has the second-largest GDP of any city in Brazil, surpassed only by São Paulo. According to the IBGE, it was approximately US$201 billion in 2008, equivalent to 5.1% of the national total. Taking into consideration the network of influence exerted by the urban metropolis (which covers 11.3% of the population), this share in GDP rises to 14.4%, according to a study released in October 2008 by the IBGE.

Greater Rio de Janeiro, as perceived by the IBGE, has a GDP of US$187 billion, constituting the second largest hub of national wealth. Per capita GDP is US$11,786. It concentrates 68% of the state's economic strength and 7.9% of all goods and services produced in the country. The services sector comprises the largest portion of GDP (65.5%), followed by commerce (23.4%), industrial activities (11.1%) and agriculture (0.1%).

Benefiting from the federal capital position it had for a long period (1763–1960), the city became a dynamic administrative, financial, commercial, and cultural center. Rio de Janeiro became an attractive place for companies to locate when it was the capital of Brazil, as important sectors of society and of the government were present in the city. The city was chosen as headquarters for state-owned companies such as Petrobras, Eletrobras, Caixa Econômica Federal, National Economic and Social Development Bank and Vale (which was privatized in the 1990s). The Rio de Janeiro Stock Exchange (BVRJ), which currently trades only government securities, was the first stock exchange founded in Brazil in 1845.

The offshore oil exploration in the Campos Basin began in 1968 and became the main site for oil production in Brazil. This caused many oil and gas companies to be based in Rio de Janeiro, such as the Brazilian branches of Shell, EBX and Esso. For many years Rio was the second largest industrial hub of Brazil, with oil refineries, shipbuilding industries, steel, metallurgy, petrochemicals, cement, pharmaceutical, textile, processed foods and furniture industries.

Major international pharmaceutical companies have their Brazilian headquarters in Rio, such as: Merck, Roche, Arrow, Darrow, Baxter, Mayne, and Mappel.

Recent decades have seen a sharp transformation in its economic profile, which is becoming more and more one of a major national hub of services and businesses. The city is the headquarters of large telecom companies, such as Intelig, Oi and Embratel. Major Brazilian entertainment and media organizations are based in Rio de Janeiro, such as Organizações Globo, and also some of Brazil's major newspapers: Jornal do Brasil, O Dia, and Business Rio.

Tourism and entertainment are other key aspects of the city's economic life. The city is the nation's top tourist attraction for both Brazilians and foreigners.

In Greater Rio, which has one of the highest per capita incomes in Brazil, retail trade is substantial. Many of the most important retail stores are located in the center. Still, others are scattered throughout the commercial areas of the other districts, where shopping centers, supermarkets, and other retail businesses handle a large volume of consumer trade.

Rio de Janeiro is (as of 2014) the second largest exporting municipality in Brazil. Annually, Rio exported a total of US$7.49B worth of goods. The top three goods exported by the municipality were crude petroleum (40%), semi-finished iron products (16%), and semi-finished steel products (11%). Material categories of mineral products (42%) and metals (29%) make up 71% of all exports from Rio.

Compared to other cities, Rio de Janeiro's economy is the second-largest in Brazil, behind São Paulo, and the 30th largest in the world with a GDP of R$ 201,9 billion in 2010. The per capita income for the city was R$22,903 in 2007 (around US$14,630). Largely because of the strength of Brazil's currency at the time, Mercer's city rankings of cost of living for expatriate employees, reported that Rio de Janeiro ranked 12th among the most expensive cities in the world in 2011, up from the 29th position in 2010, just behind São Paulo (ranked 10th), and ahead of London, Paris, Milan, and New York. Rio also had the most expensive hotel rates in Brazil, and the daily rate of its five star hotels were the second most expensive in the world after only New York.

=== Highlighted sectors ===
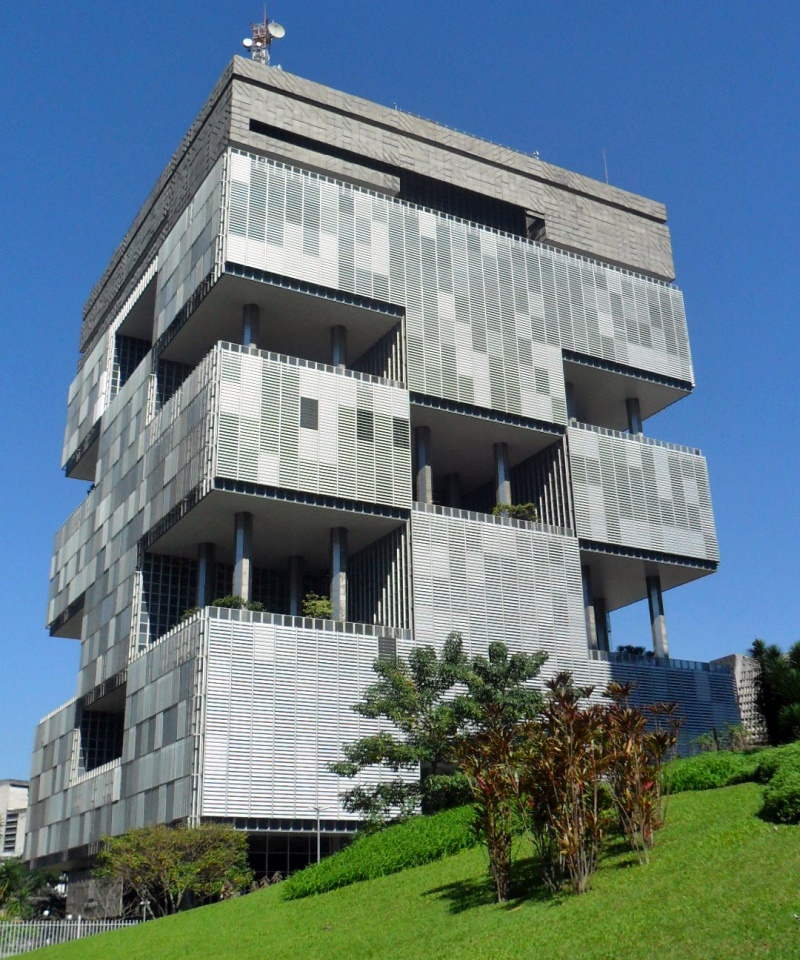
Headquarters building of Petrobras

Rio de Janeiro is home to many of Brazil's largest business conglomerates. Among them are the three largest multinationals in the energy and mining sectors: Petrobras, Vale S.A., and the EBX Group; the largest media and communications group in Latin America, Grupo Globo; and major telecommunications companies like CorpCo (owner of Oi and Portugal Telecom), TIM, Embratel, Intelig, and Star One (the largest satellite management company in Latin America).

In the petrochemical sector, there are more than 700 companies, including Brazil's largest (Shell, Esso, Ipiranga, Chevron, PRIO, Repsol). Most maintain research centers throughout the state and together produce over four-fifths of the petroleum and fuels distributed at service stations nationwide. The Companhia Siderúrgica Nacional (CSN), Ternium Brasil (the largest steel mill in Latin America) and the Brazilian branch of BHP Billiton play significant roles in the mining sector. The city also hosts the main national and international groups of the shipbuilding industry and the largest shipyards in the state and throughout Brazil, which produce about 90% of the ships and offshore equipment in Brazil.

Americanas, Coca-Cola Brasil, Eletrobras, Michelin, Neoenergia, Xerox do Brasil, GE Oil & Gas, Light, Chemtech, Transpetro, BAT Brasil, Grupo SulAmérica and Vibra Energia are among the major companies headquartered in the city. The city has a significant number of pharmaceutical industries, including Schering-Plough, GlaxoSmithKline, Roche, and Merck.

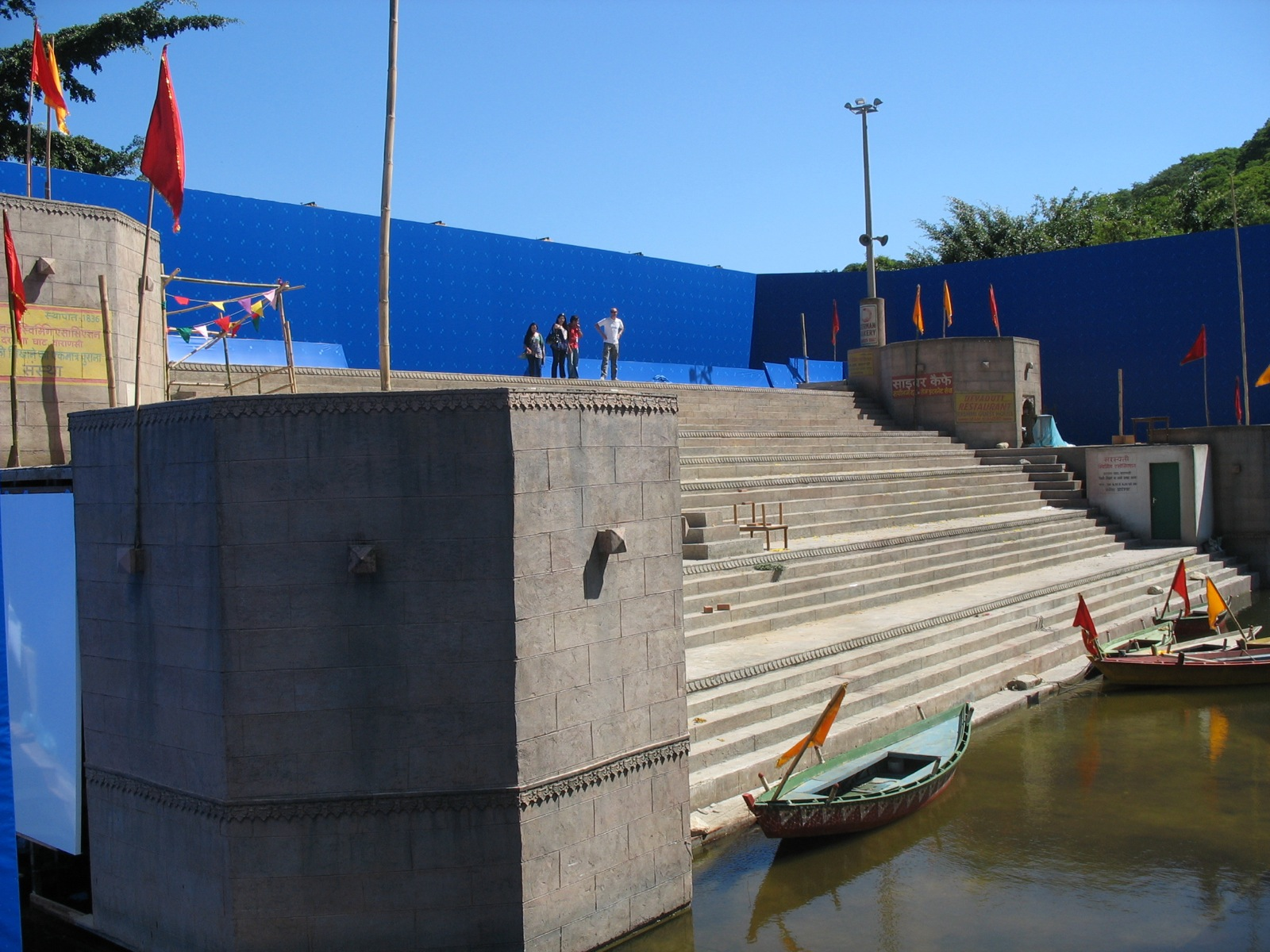
Replica of the Ganges River at the scenic city of Projac, the second-largest television complex in Latin America

Rio de Janeiro has inherited a strong cultural vocation from its past. It currently hosts the main production centers of Brazilian television: the Estúdios Globo of TV Globo, the Casablanca Estúdios of Record, and the Polo de Cinema de Jacarepaguá — responsible for creating about 10,000 direct jobs and 30,000 indirect jobs. In 2006, 65% of Brazilian cinema production was done exclusively by studios in Rio, generating 91 million reais in federal funds through tax incentive laws. A significant part of the Brazilian editorial graphic industry is also present. In the phonographic industry, companies such as EMI, Universal Music, Sony Music, Warner Music and Som Livre are present.

Many state-owned companies, public foundations, and federal autarchies have their headquarters in the city, including the National Bank for Economic and Social Development (BNDES), the Casa da Moeda do Brasil, the Indústrias Nucleares do Brasil (INB), the Financiadora de Estudos e Projetos (FINEP), the Instituto Brasileiro de Geografia e Estatística (IBGE), the Instituto Nacional de Metrologia, Normalização e Qualidade Industrial (Inmetro), the Instituto Nacional da Propriedade Industrial (INPI), the Comissão de Valores Mobiliários (CVM), and the Comissão Nacional de Energia Nuclear (CNEN).

=== Tourism ===
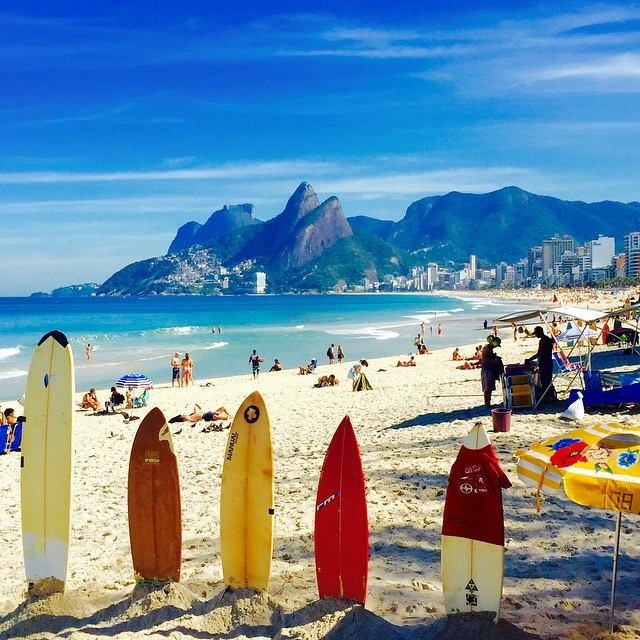
Ipanema beach

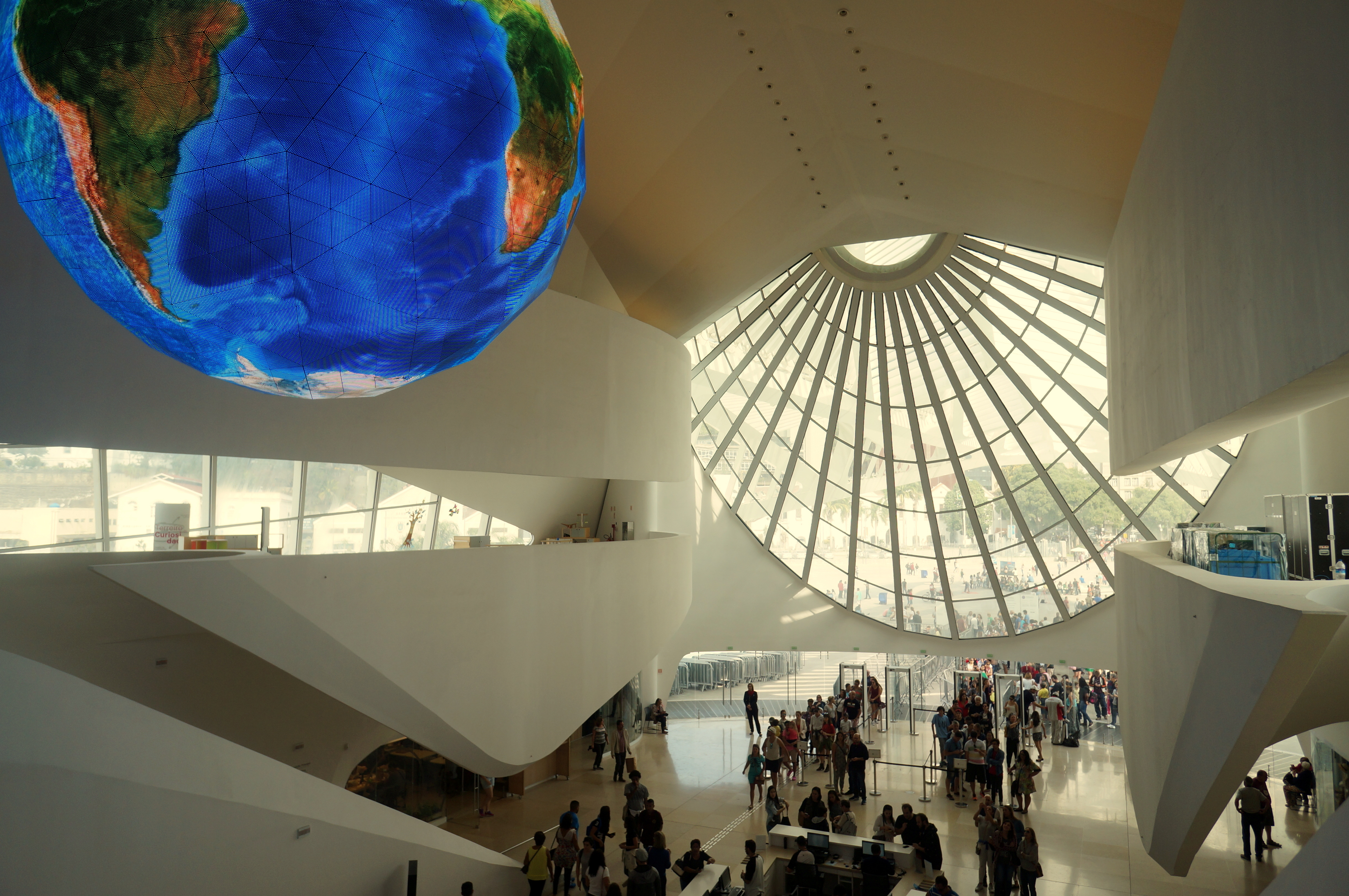
Museum of Tomorrow

Rio de Janeiro is Brazil's primary tourist attraction and resort. It receives the most visitors per year of any city in South America, with 2.82 million international tourists a year.

Attractions in the city include approximately 80 kilometers of beaches, Corcovado and Sugarloaf mountains, and the Maracanã Stadium. While the city had in the past had a thriving tourism sector, the industry entered a decline in the last quarter of the 20th century. Annual international airport arrivals dropped from 621,000 to 378,000, and average hotel occupancy dropped to 50% between 1985 and 1993. The fact that Brasília replaced Rio de Janeiro as the Brazilian capital in 1960 and that São Paulo replaced Rio as the country's commercial, financial and main cultural center during the mid-20th century, has also been cited as a leading cause of the decline.

Rio de Janeiro's government has since undertaken to modernize the city's economy, reduce its chronic social inequalities, and improve its commercial standing as part of an initiative for the regeneration of the tourism industry.

Rio de Janeiro is an international hub of active and diverse nightlife with bars, dance bars and nightclubs staying open well past midnight. The city is a global LGBTQ destination, with 1 million LGBT tourists visiting each year.

Farme de Amoedo Street (Rua Farme de Amoedo) is located in Ipanema. The street and the nearby beach are popular in the LGBTQ community.

== Infrastructure ==
=== Public transportation ===
Public transport map of Rio de Janeiro

Rio de Janeiro's public transportation modes include city buses, coach buses, BRT, metro, suburban rail, light rail, ferries, inclined elevators, vans and a cable car. Collectively, they carry over 2.6 million passengers per day. The high fares on Rio's public transportation have significantly contributed to the high levels of social and economic inequality in the city and were the main motive of the 2013 protest movement. Although there is limited fare integration through the RioCard, Rio de Janeiro's fare systems are still disjointed and not fully accessible.

In 2022, the average amount of time people spent commuting with public transit in Rio de Janeiro on a weekday was 67 minutes. 12% of public transit riders had commutes that took more than two hours per day. The average amount of time people waited at a stop or station for public transit was 21 minutes, with 12% of riders waiting less than 5 minutes and 41% of riders waiting for over 20 minutes. The average distance people usually traveled in a single trip with public transit was 11.4 km (7.1 mi). The average distance people walked on their commute was 634 m (0.39 miles). 11% of people made exactly two transfers during their commute, and 2% of commuters made 3 or more transfers.

==== Buses and vans ====
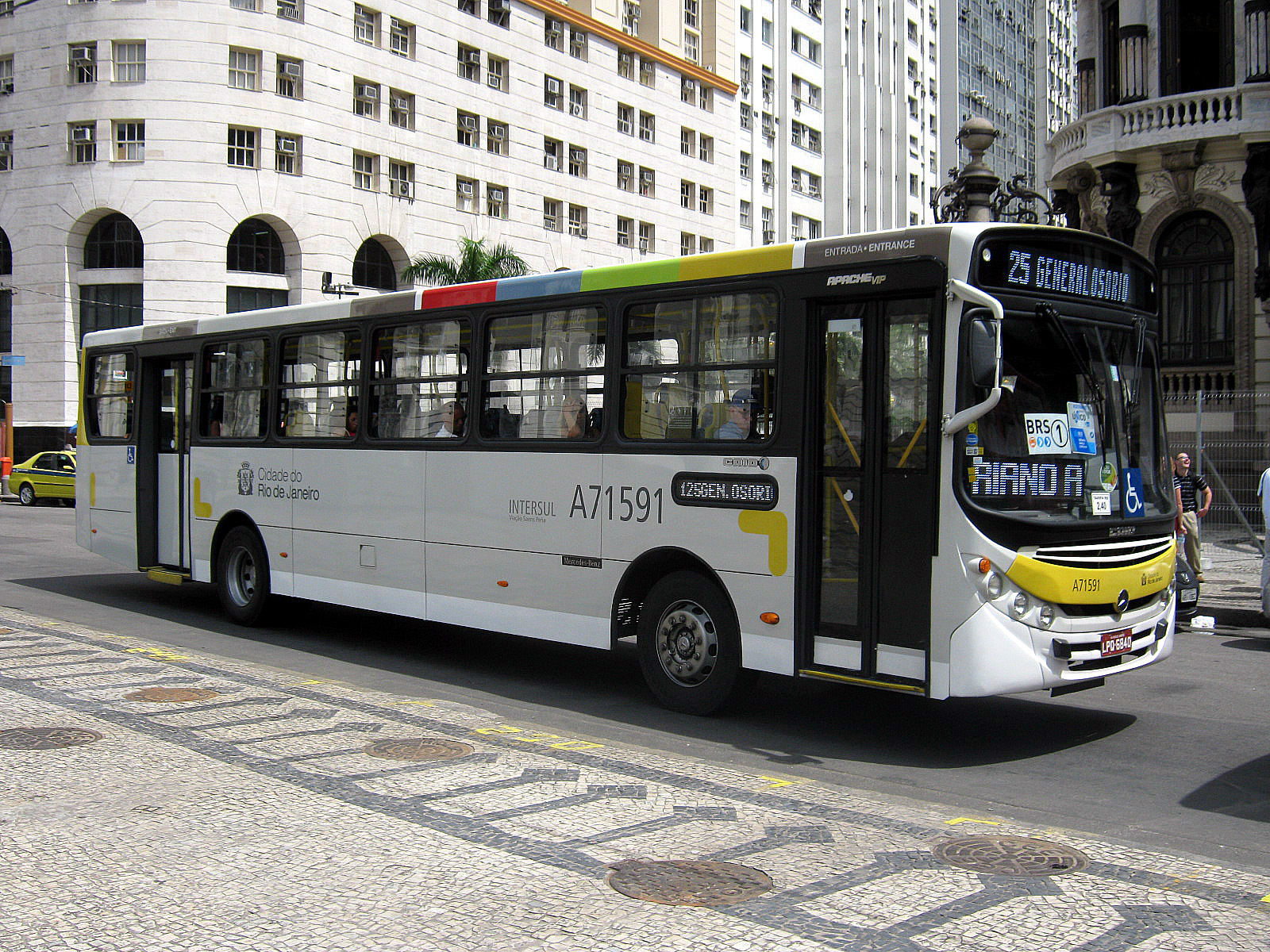
City bus in mixed traffic

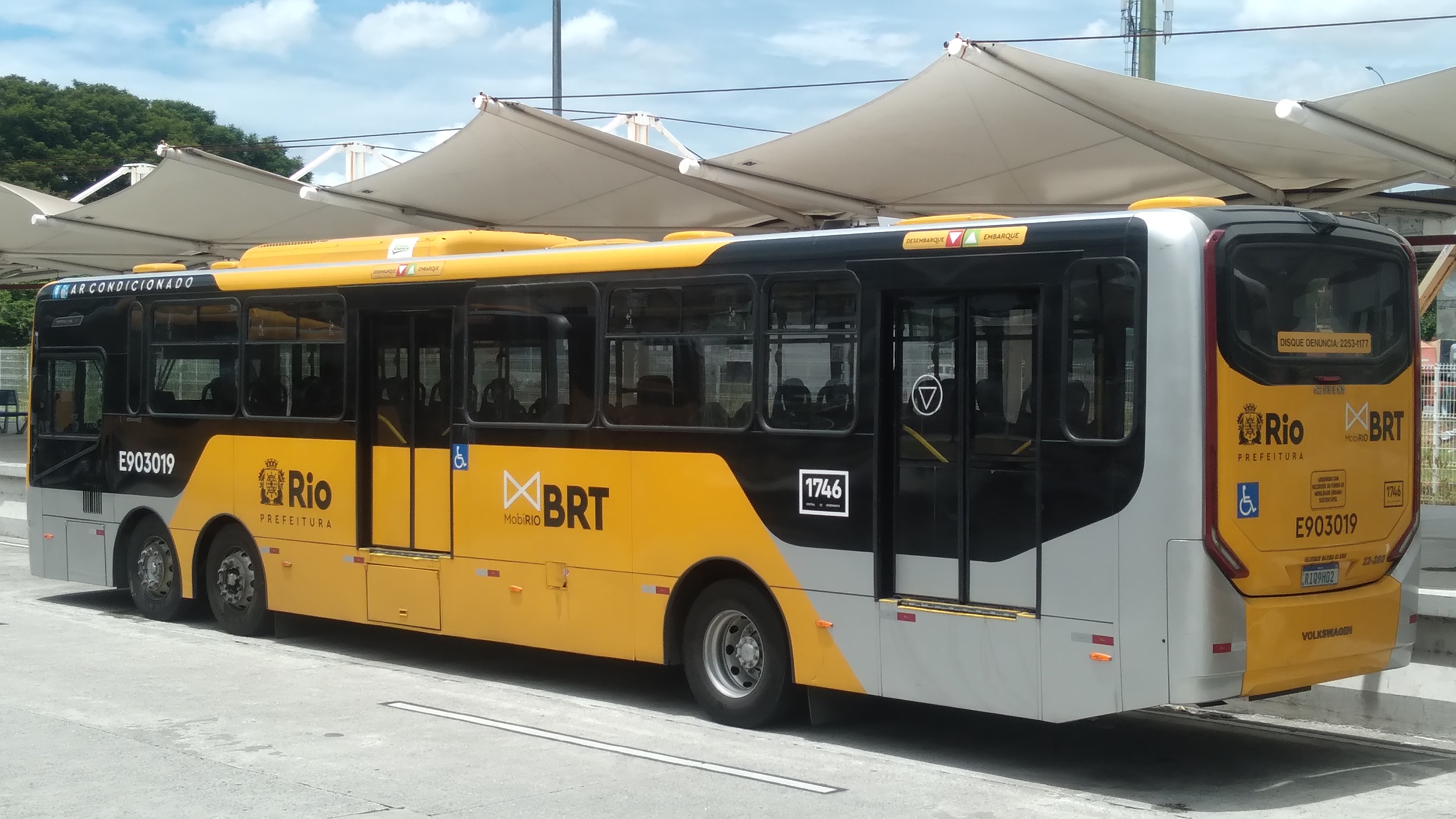
Transcarioca Bus Rapid Transit (BRT)

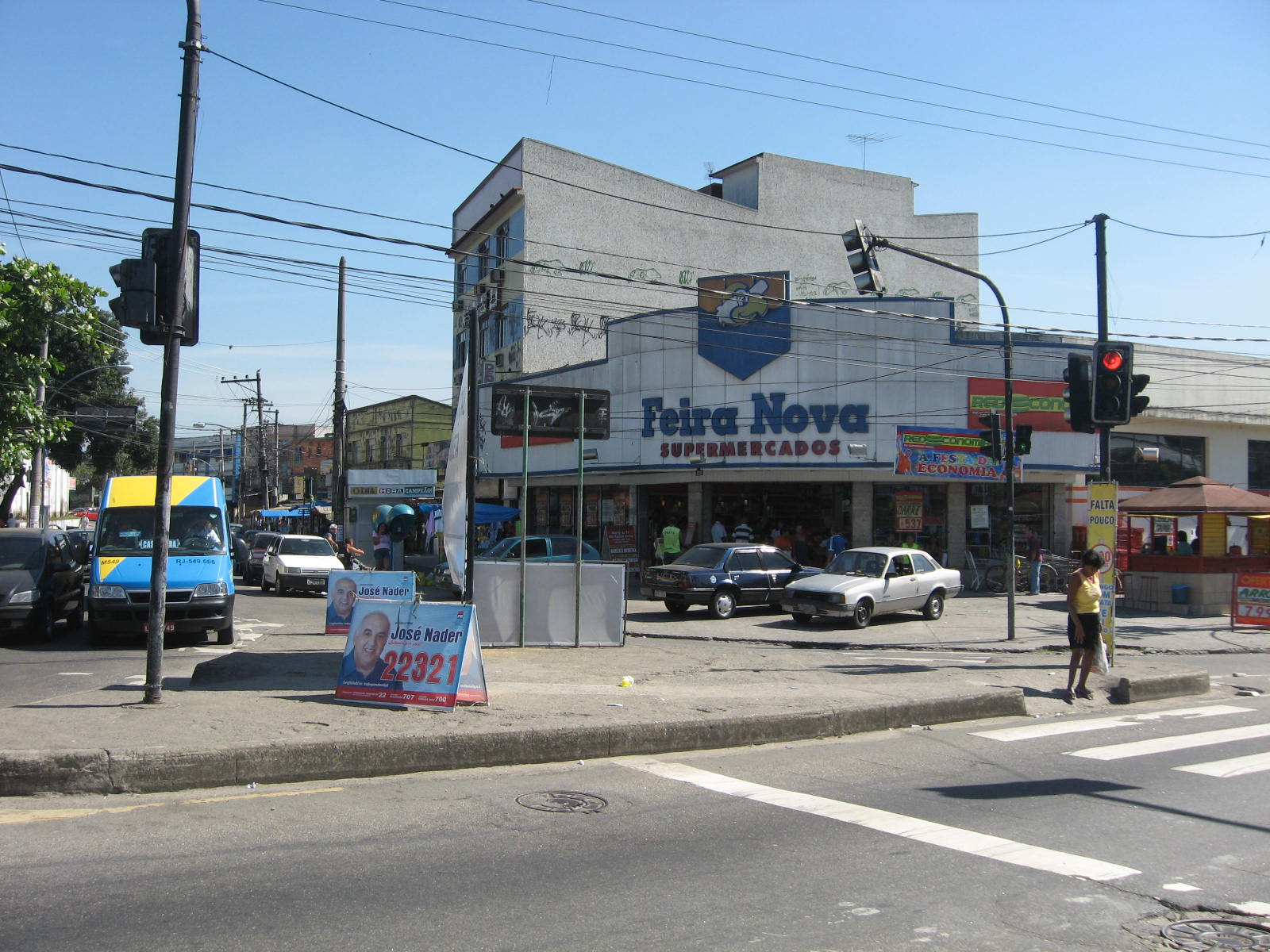
Van

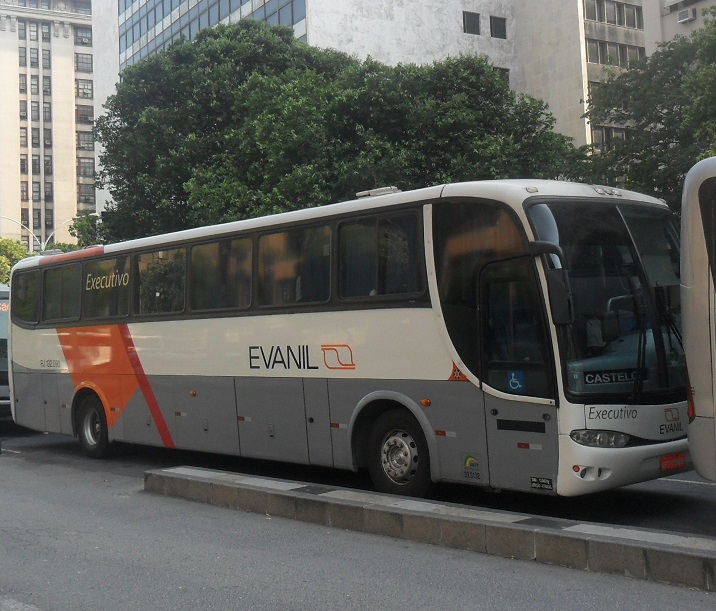
Coach bus used for local intracity service

As of 2023, there are 354 municipal bus lines serving over 1.75 million passengers per day, as well as intercity lines. The city has 20 bus lanes. Most conventional bus routes are operated by 28 private companies divided into 4 consortiums, though 3 routes are run by the city government. Although most buses are conventional city buses, there are also a handful of coach buses used for local intracity service with more expensive fares.

The Bus Rapid Transit system consists of 31 lines running along 4 corridors with a wide variety of service patterns: Transbrasil, Transcarioca, Transolímpica and Transoeste. The municipal government runs the system through Mobi-Rio, which is a state-owned enterprise. It is 157 km (98 mi) long and has 153 stations as well as 731 buses that carry 535,000 passengers per day.

In addition to buses, Rio de Janeiro also has an extensive system of vans used for public transport. This mode can more effectively traverse the steep, narrow and winding roads common in many favelas than buses and is often a lifeline for them. However, most vans are run by criminal organizations, particularly police militias, which use their fares as a major source of revenue: Of the approximately 10,000 vans used for public transport in the city, only 2,000 are legal. The 2,000 legal vans carry approximately 310,000 passengers per day.

Rio de Janeiro also has intercity, interstate and international bus lines. Most long-distance bus lines run to Novo Rio Bus Terminal at the edge of the Zona Central. Long-distance buses also run to bus stations in Campo Grande and Barra da Tijuca.

==== Urban rail ====
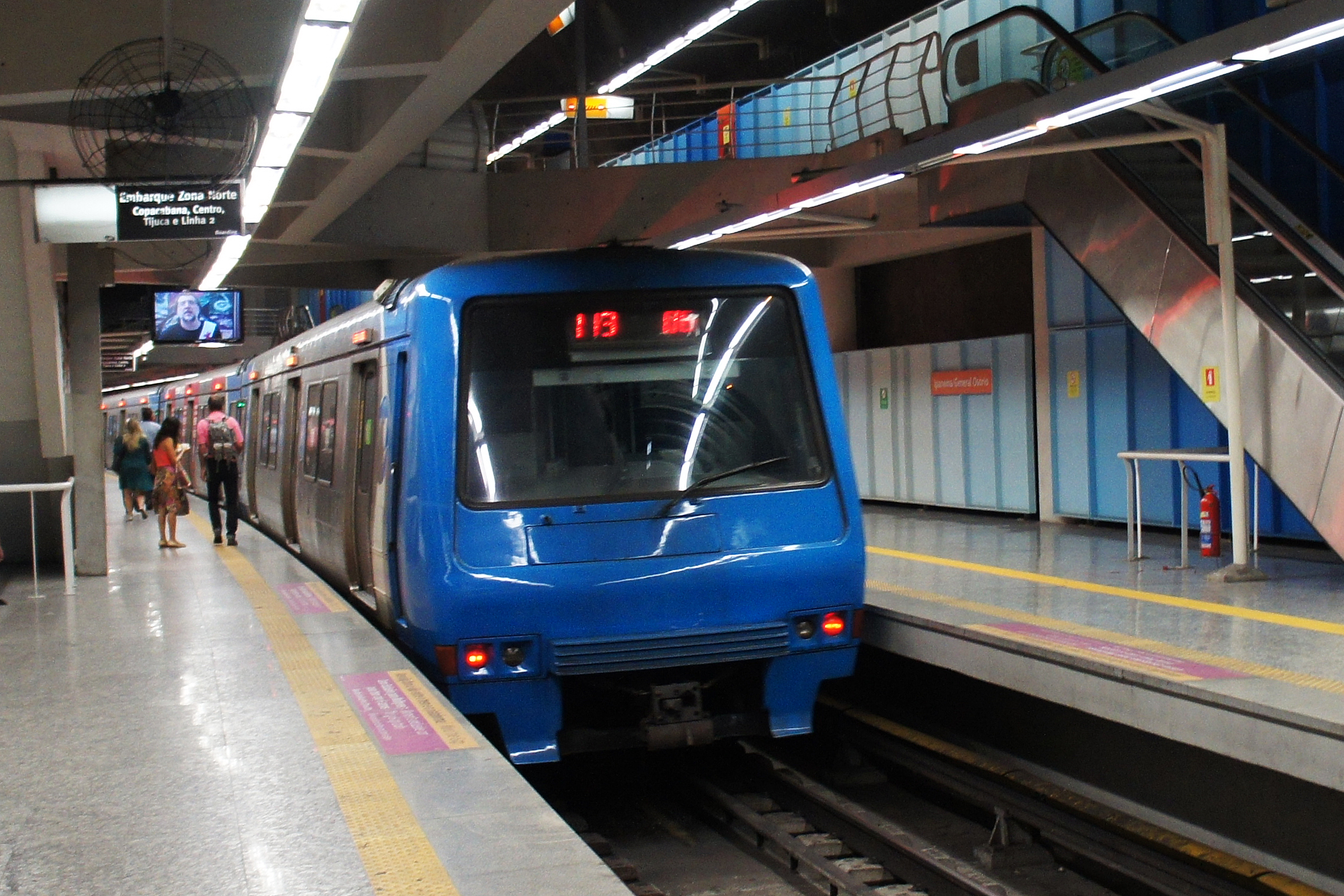
Train of Rio de Janeiro Metro

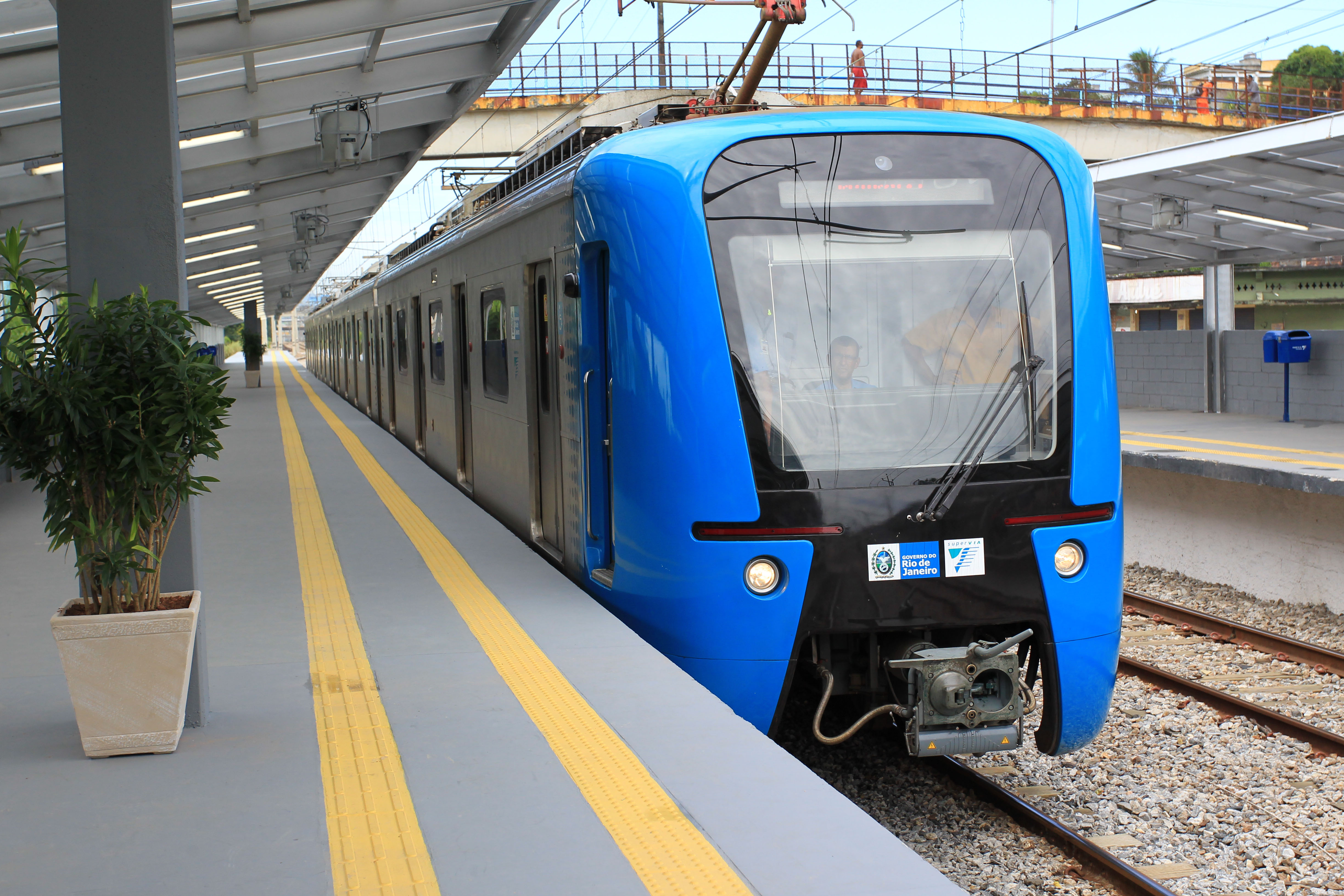
Urban train from SuperVia

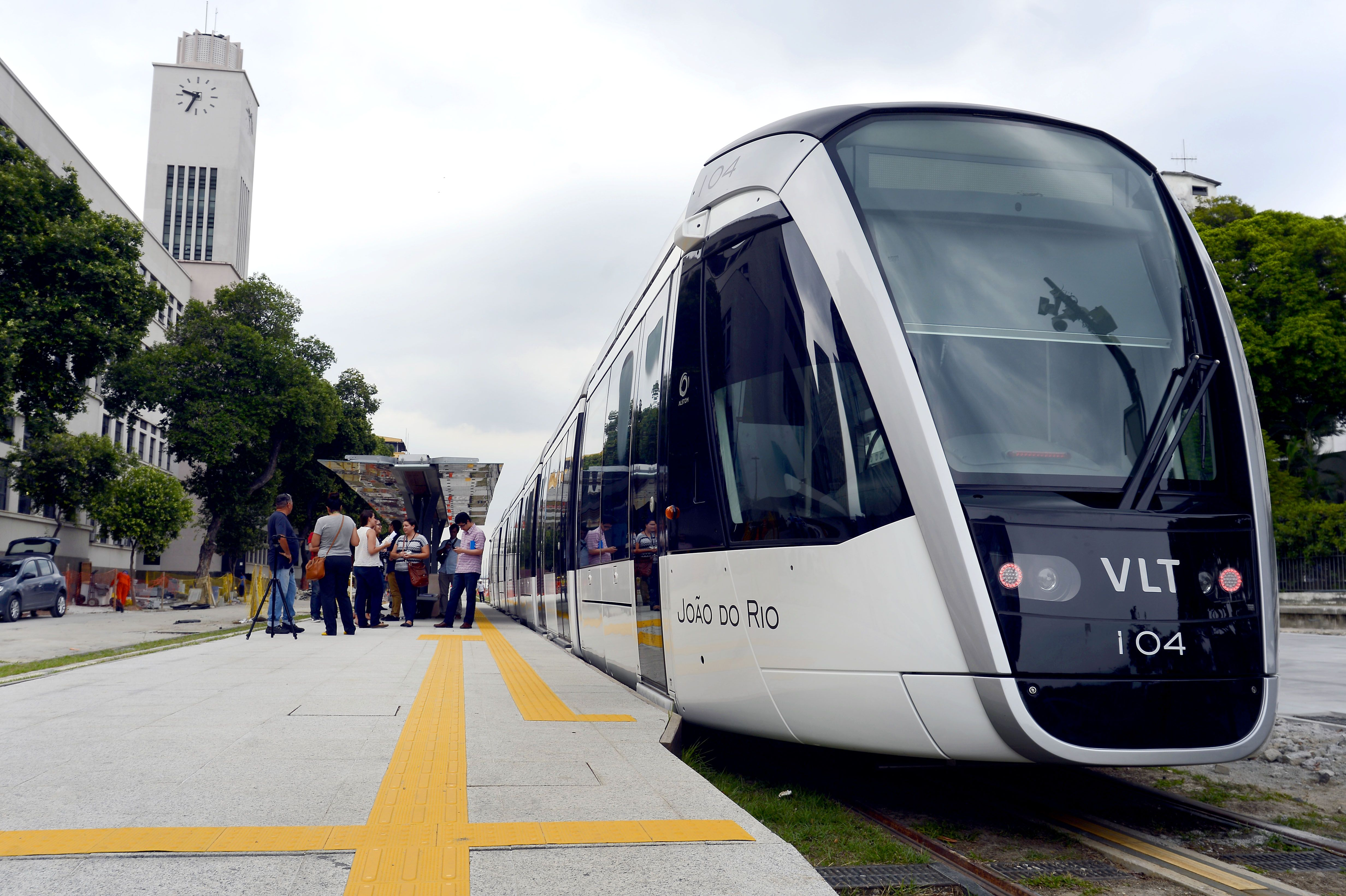
Rio de Janeiro Light Rail

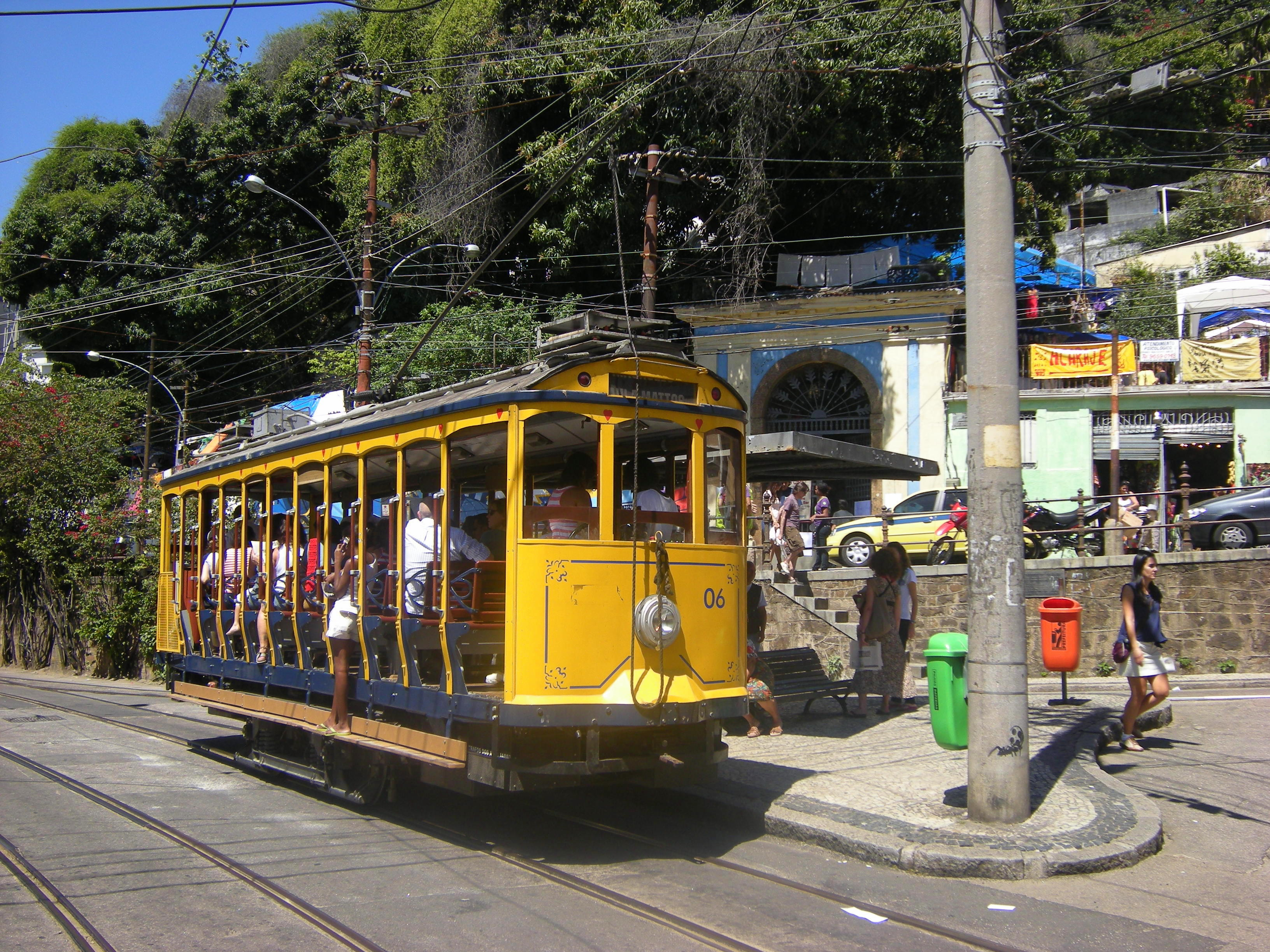
Santa Teresa Tram

Rio de Janeiro nominally has three metro lines, though two of them (Lines 1 and 4) are operationally run as a single line. The system runs on 58 km (36 mi) of track and has 41 stations. Line 1/4 runs from Uruguai/Tijuca station in Tijuca to Jardim Oceânico/Barra da Tijuca station in Barra da Tijuca; Line 2 runs from Pavuna station in Pavuna to Botafogo station in Botafogo. Line 1/4 and Line 2 share tracks between Central do Brasil and Botafogo. The metro system carries 651,000 passengers per day.

The city also has a suburban rail system operated by SuperVia that connects the city of Rio with other locations in Greater Rio de Janeiro. It has 8 lines on 270 km (168 mi) of track with 103 stations in 12 municipalities; Rio de Janeiro municipality itself has 127 km (79 mi) of track with 59 stations on 5 lines. The Deodoro Line runs from Central do Brasil to Deodoro via Maracanã, Méier and Madureira; the Santa Cruz Line runs from Central do Brasil to Santa Cruz, running parallel to the Deodoro line for its entire length and then via Realengo, Bangu and Campo Grande; the Japeri Line shares tracks with the Santa Cruz Line between Central do Brasil and Deodoro before continuing on to Japeri via Anchieta, Nilópolis, Mesquita, Nova Iguaçu and Queimados; the Belford Roxo and Saracuruna Lines run parallel to the Deodoro, Santa Cruz and Japeri Lines between Central do Brasil and Maracanã, with the Belford Roxo Line continuing on to Belford Roxo via Madureira, Pavuna and São João de Meriti and the Saracuruna Line continuing on to Duque de Caxias via Bonsucesso, Ramos and Penha. The suburban rail system carries around 342,000 passengers per day.

The Rio de Janeiro Light Rail is a modern light rail system that runs entirely within the Zona Central on 28 km (17 mi) of track with 30 stations distributed along 4 heavily interlined lines: Line 1 runs from Santos Dumont Airport to Gentileza Intermodal Terminal via Carioca, the Port of Rio de Janeiro and Novo Rio Bus Terminal; Line 2 runs from Praça XV to Praia Formosa via Praça Tiradentes, Central do Brasil and Novo Rio Bus Terminal; Line 3 runs from Santos Dumont Airport to Central do Brasil via Carioca and Pequena África; Line 4 shares track with Line 2 for almost its entire route, but stops at Gentileza Intermodal Terminal instead of Praia Formosa. The trams are the first in the world to use a combination of ground-level power supply (APS) and on-board supercapacitor energy storage (SRS), in order to eliminate overhead lines along the entire route. The network uses 32 Alstom Citadis 402 low-floor trams carrying 420 passengers each. They are bi-directional, air-conditioned, have seven sections, and eight doors per side. The light rail system carries 101,000 passengers per day.

The Santa Teresa Tram runs from Carioca to Santa Teresa and is the oldest operating electric tramway in Latin America, having commenced electric operation in 1896, replacing horse-drawn trams and extending the route. At this time the gauge was altered to 1,100 mm (3 ft 7 5/16 in) so that the trams would fit on top of Carioca Aqueduct. It was designated a national historic monument in 1985. After a derailment occurred on 27 August 2011, which left six dead; tram service was suspended to improve the system. The elderly tramcars, which dated from the 1950s, were retired and replaced with newly built replicas that have the appearance of the old fleet but with new mechanical equipment and additional safety features; delivery began in 2014. The line's track was also rebuilt, and after some delays, about one-third of the line reopened in July 2015. More sections reopened later in stages, following repair of additional sections of track. The main section of the line was restored to its full pre-2011 length of 6 km (4 mi) in January 2019. The 1.7 km (1.1 mi) Paula Mattos branch to Largo das Neves, which was also closed in 2011, was reopened in January 2025. Santa Teresa residents can ride the tram for free, but ticket prices are prohibitively expensive for other cariocas and, because of this, the line is primarily used by tourists. The tram gets an average of 1900 passengers per day.

==== Ferries ====
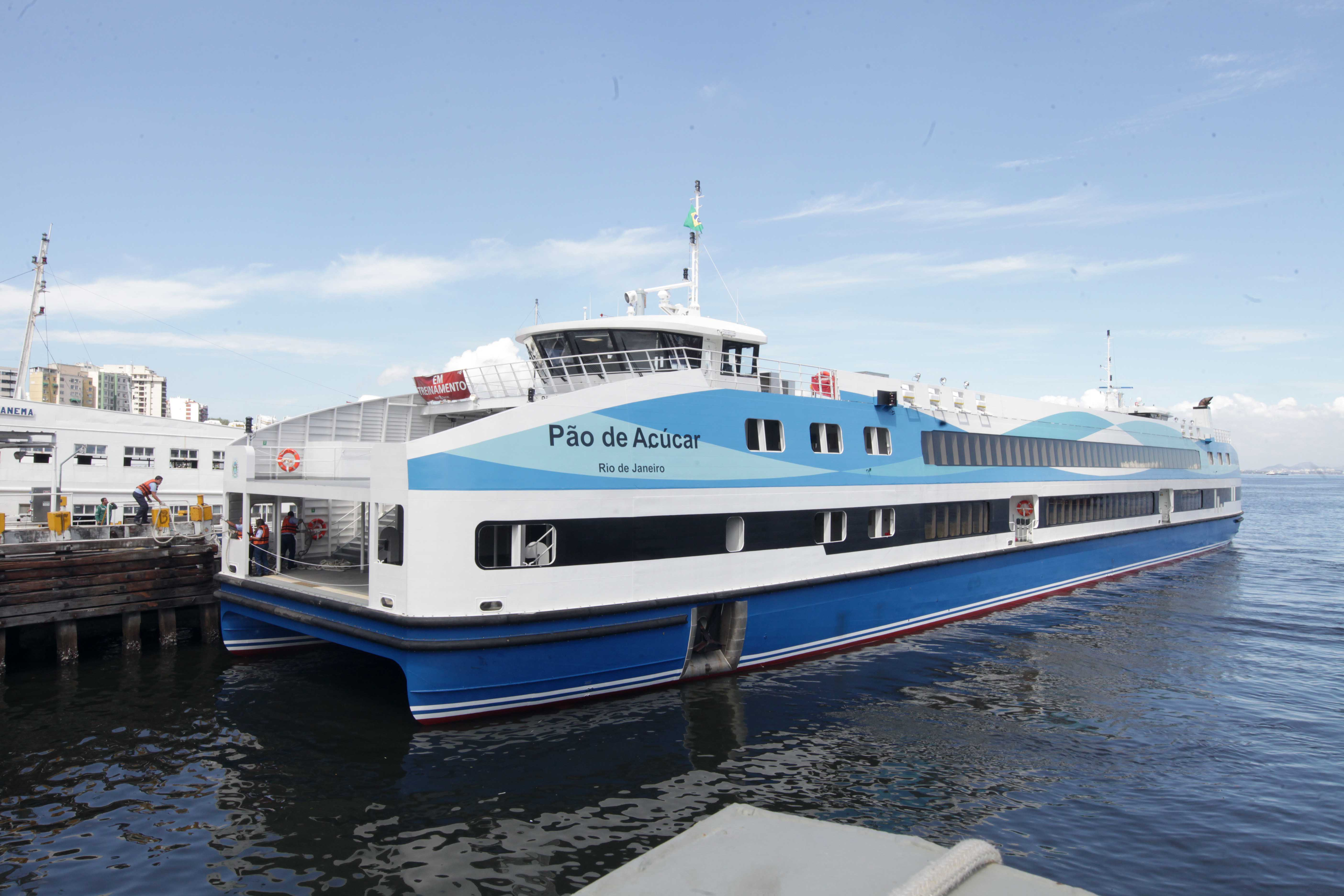
Rio de Janeiro ferry

Rio de Janeiro has ferry routes running radially out from Praça XV in the city center to Praça Araribóia (in Niterói's city center), Charitas (in the South side of Niterói), Cocotá (on Governador Island) and Paquetá Island. All four ferry routes run entirely through Guanabara Bay. The Praça XV-Praça Araribóia route is by far the busiest and carries commuters from Niterói, São Gonçalo, Itaboraí and Maricá. Each ferry carries up to 2000 passengers, with the ferry system as a whole carrying 35,000 passengers per day.

==== Cable car ====
The Providência Cable Car is a 721 m (0.45 miles) long cable car line that runs from Central do Brasil to Gamboa via Providência Hill, serving the city's oldest favela. The cable car first opened in 2014, was abandoned in 2017 and reopened in 2024. The line uses 16 gondolas and carries 9000 passengers per day.

==== Inclined elevators ====
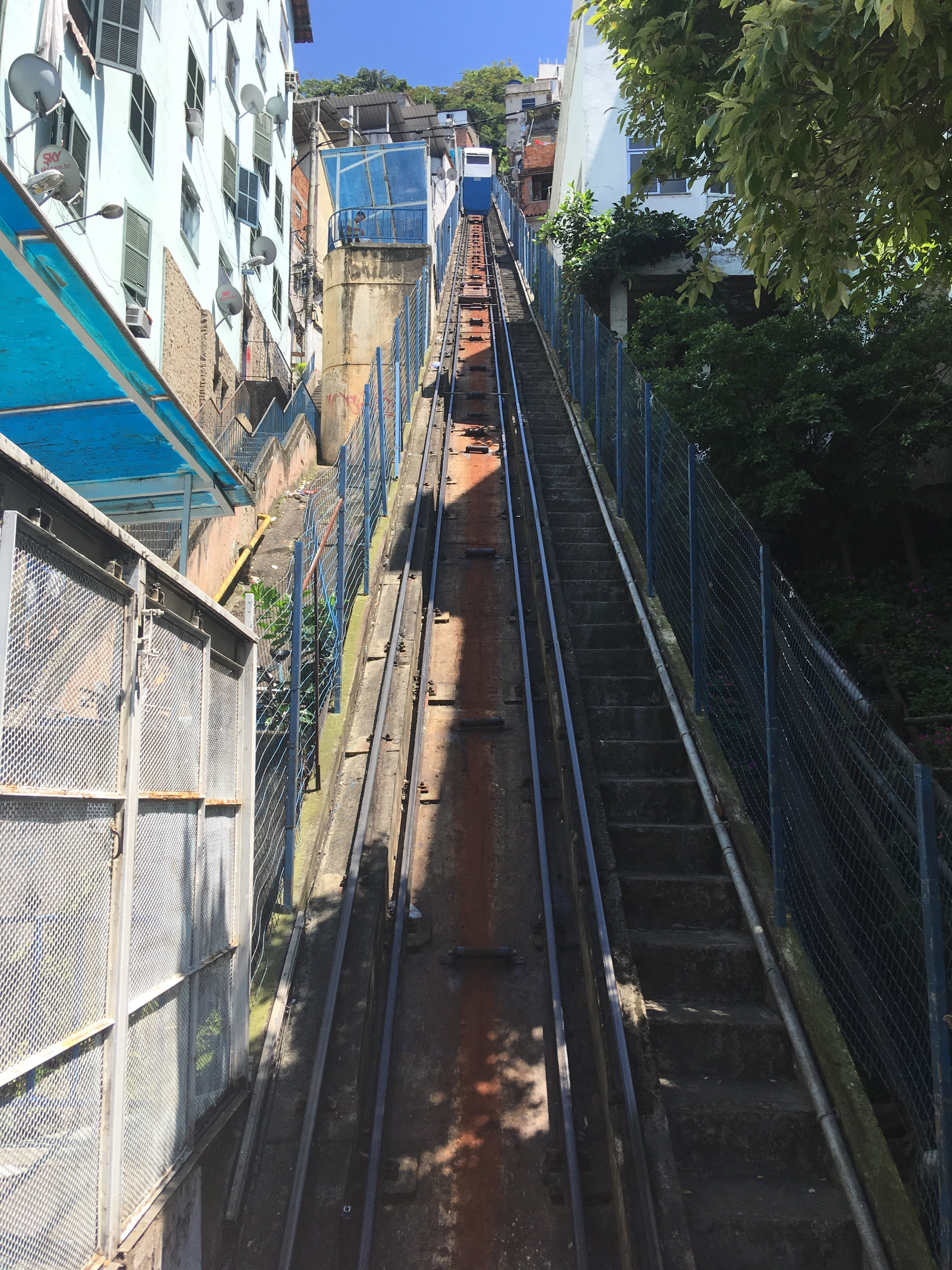
Pavão-Pavãozinho Inclined Elevator

Rio de Janeiro has 8 public inclined elevators climbing 5 hills, all of which are run by the municipal government through the Municipal Energy and Illumination Company (RioLuz). The Santa Marta Inclined Elevator runs up Dona Marta Hill in two sections with 5 total stations and carries 5000 passengers per day. The Pavão-Pavãozinho Inclined Elevator runs from General Osório/Ipanema station to Cantagalo-Pavão-Pavãozinho and consists of a single 153 m (502 ft) long line with 5 stations that carries 4000 passengers per day. The Penna Church Inclined Elevator is 70 m (230 ft) long and runs from Jacarepaguá to Our Lady of Penna Church at the top of Penna Hill, carrying 180 passengers per day. The Father Laércio Dias de Moura Inclined Elevator is a group of three inclined elevators that connect Penha station to Vila Cruzeiro and the Basilica of Our Lady of Penha; the inclined elevators have a total length of 426 m (1,398 ft) and carry 3000 passengers per day. The Outeiro da Glória Inclined Elevator is 65 m (213 ft) long and runs from Glória station to Our Lady of Glória do Outeiro Church, carrying 200 passengers per day.

=== Roads ===
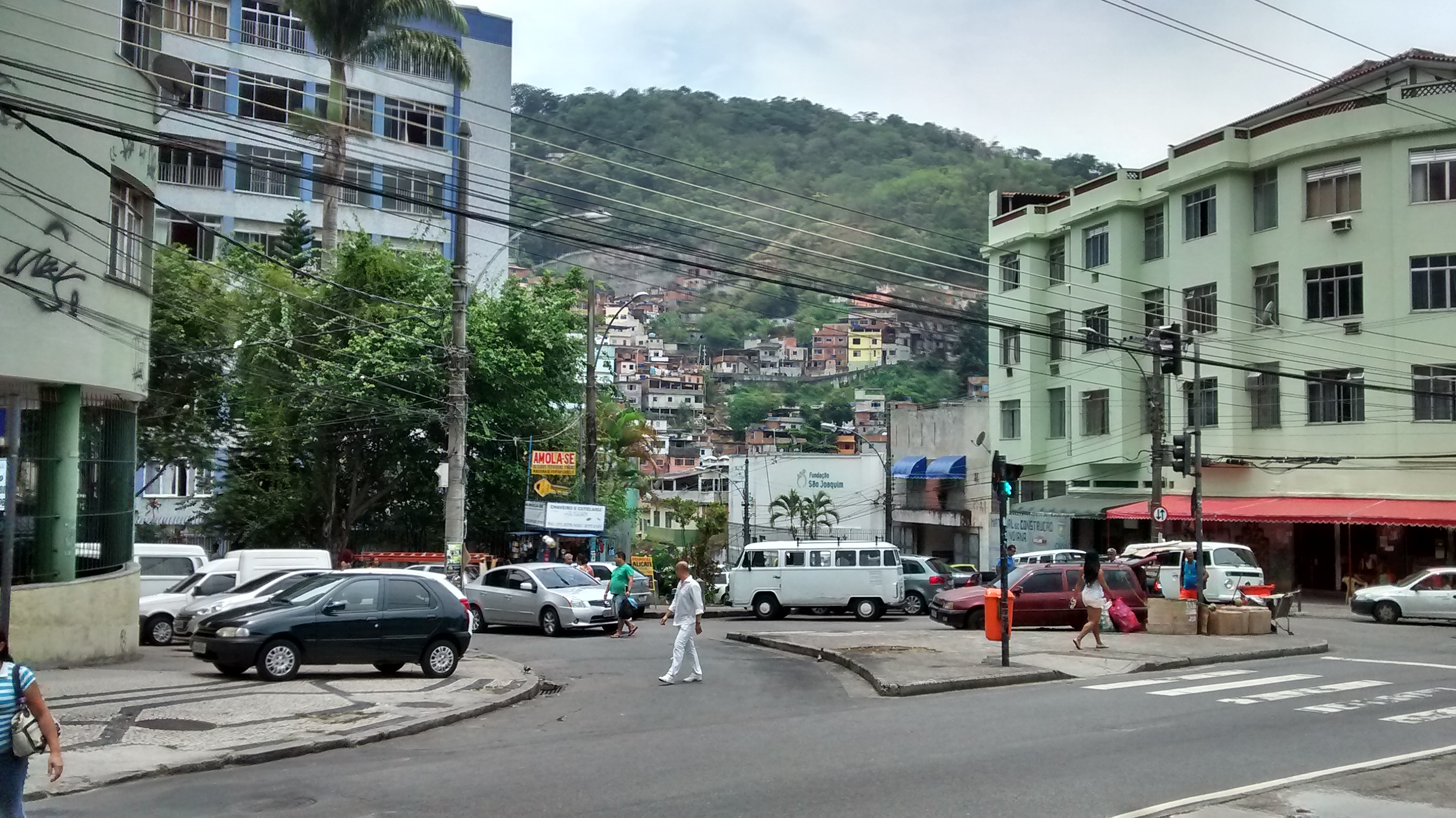
Streetscape in Rio de Janeiro

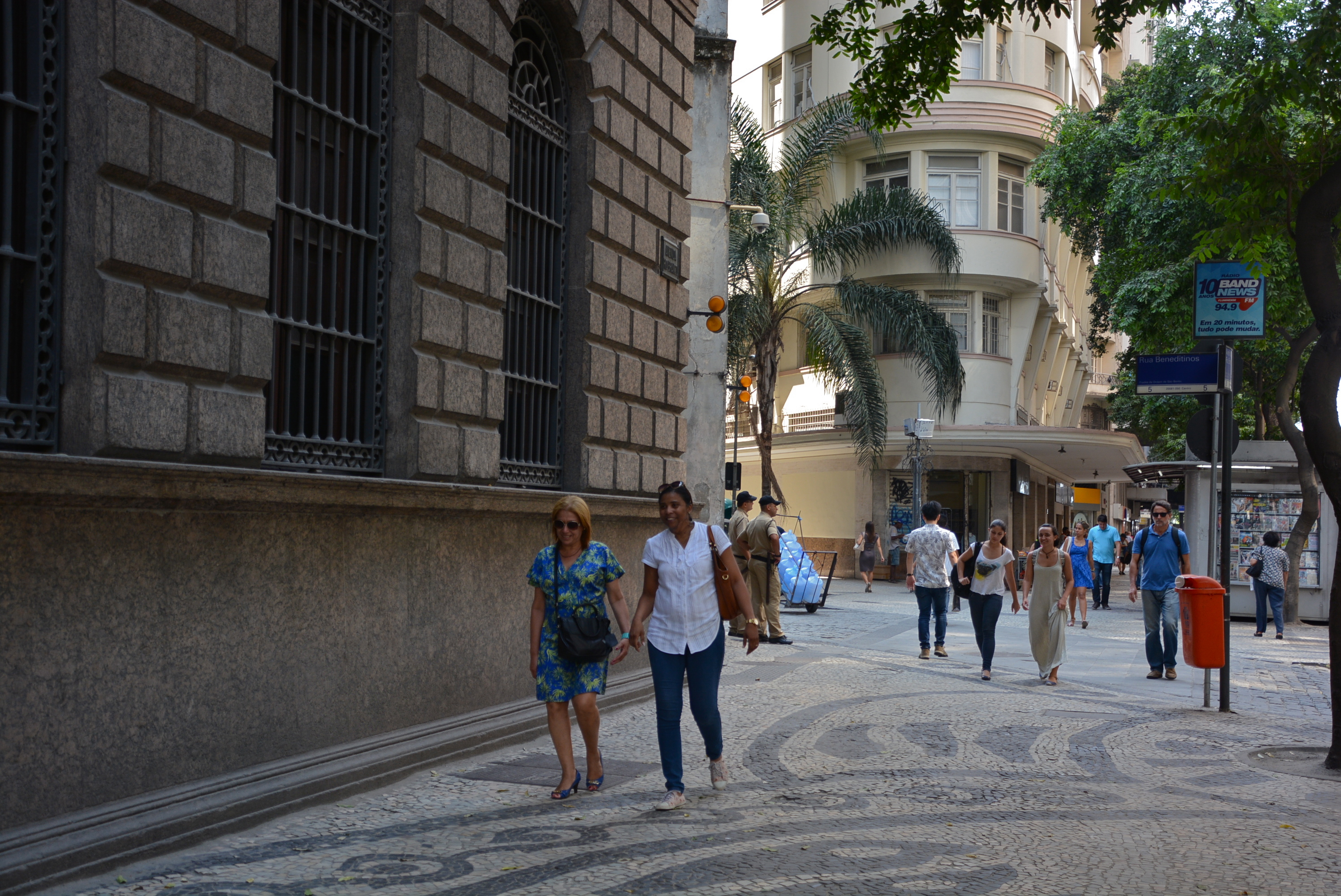
Pedestrian infrastructure in Rio de Janeiro

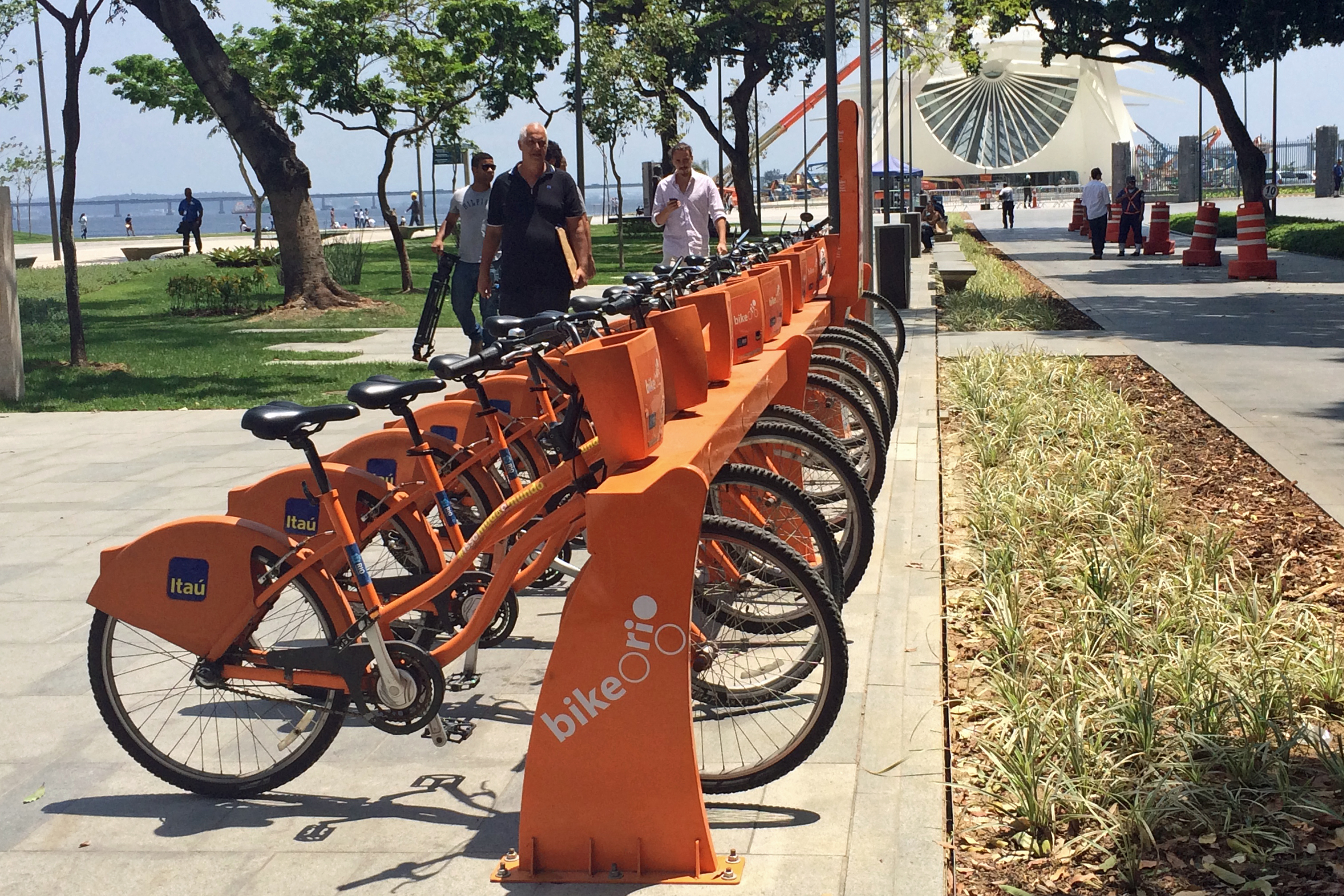
Bike Rio rental station in Mauá Square, Downtown Rio

Rio de Janeiro has 601 km (373 mi) of limited-access roads, 731 km (454 mi) of arterial roads, 1,245 km (774 mi) of collector roads and 6,678 km (4,150 mi) of local roads with vehicular traffic. Despite representing 72% of roads with vehicular traffic, just 14% of traffic collisions and 14% of traffic fatalities are on local roads; 38% of traffic fatalities happen on 20 roads, with Avenida Brasil alone accounting for 14%. Rio de Janeiro had 694 traffic deaths in 2022, equivalent to 11 deaths per 100,000 inhabitants.

Rio de Janeiro's vehicle fleet includes 3.2 million motorized vehicles - equivalent to 482 per 1000 inhabitants - including 2.2 million cars, 500,000 motorcycles, 400,000 trucks and 37,000 buses and minibuses. 37% of vehicles use exclusively E27 fuel; 6% use E100; 4% use diesel fuel, and 59% use various combinations of ethanol, gasoline and natural gas. An average of 1.6 million motorized vehicles circulate per day in the city. Approximately 47% of all trips in Rio use public transport; 23% use private motorized vehicles and 28% use active mobility.

Despite being in the Atlantic Forest, Rio de Janeiro has a severe lack of street trees. The distribution of the trees that do exist is highly unequal: poorer neighbourhoods on the North side of the city are disproportionately likely to lack tree cover, as are neighbourhoods with higher populations of pardo and black people. Overall, 35% of cariocas live on streets without any trees at all, and another 26% live on streets with fewer than 5 trees. This environmental racism directly causes poorer neighbourhoods to suffer from more extreme weather, including more severe flooding and higher temperatures - for example, Lagoa has a mean income per capita nearly 10 times higher than that of Del Castilho and has a mean temperature of 26 °C (79 °F), as opposed to Del Castilho's 33 °C (91 °F).

Despite Rio de Janeiro's ample sidewalk coverage, many sidewalks are narrow, inaccessible for disabled people, and filled with obstacles. Traffic lights frequently prioritize vehicular traffic on busy roads significantly more than pedestrian traffic, which can significantly increase pedestrian travel times. Portuguese pavement, which is common in Rio de Janeiro, is extremely slippery in the rain and gets easily damaged by tree roots, which further harms pedestrian accessibility. The city has pedestrian zones in the city center, Paquetá Island and concentrated around the suburban rail stations in Bangu, Campo Grande and Penha, as well as in favelas. Part of the city has a wayfinding system similar to Legible London.

Rio de Janeiro has approximately 247 km of shared-use paths, 119 km of sharrows, 64 km of segregated cycle tracks, and 28 km of roadside bike lanes. 16% of cariocas live within 300 meters of bicycle infrastructure; the bicycle infrastructure network also reaches 30% of jobs, 16% of schools, and 21% of health facilities. 127 of the city's 288 medium- and high-capacity public transport (BRT, ferry, light rail, metro and suburban rail) stations are served by bicycle infrastructure. Bicycle infrastructure in the city is frequently narrow, with 66% of it failing to reach the city government's minimum standards. The city also has a bicycle sharing system called Bike Rio with 430 stations and 6700 bicycles.

==== Major highways ====
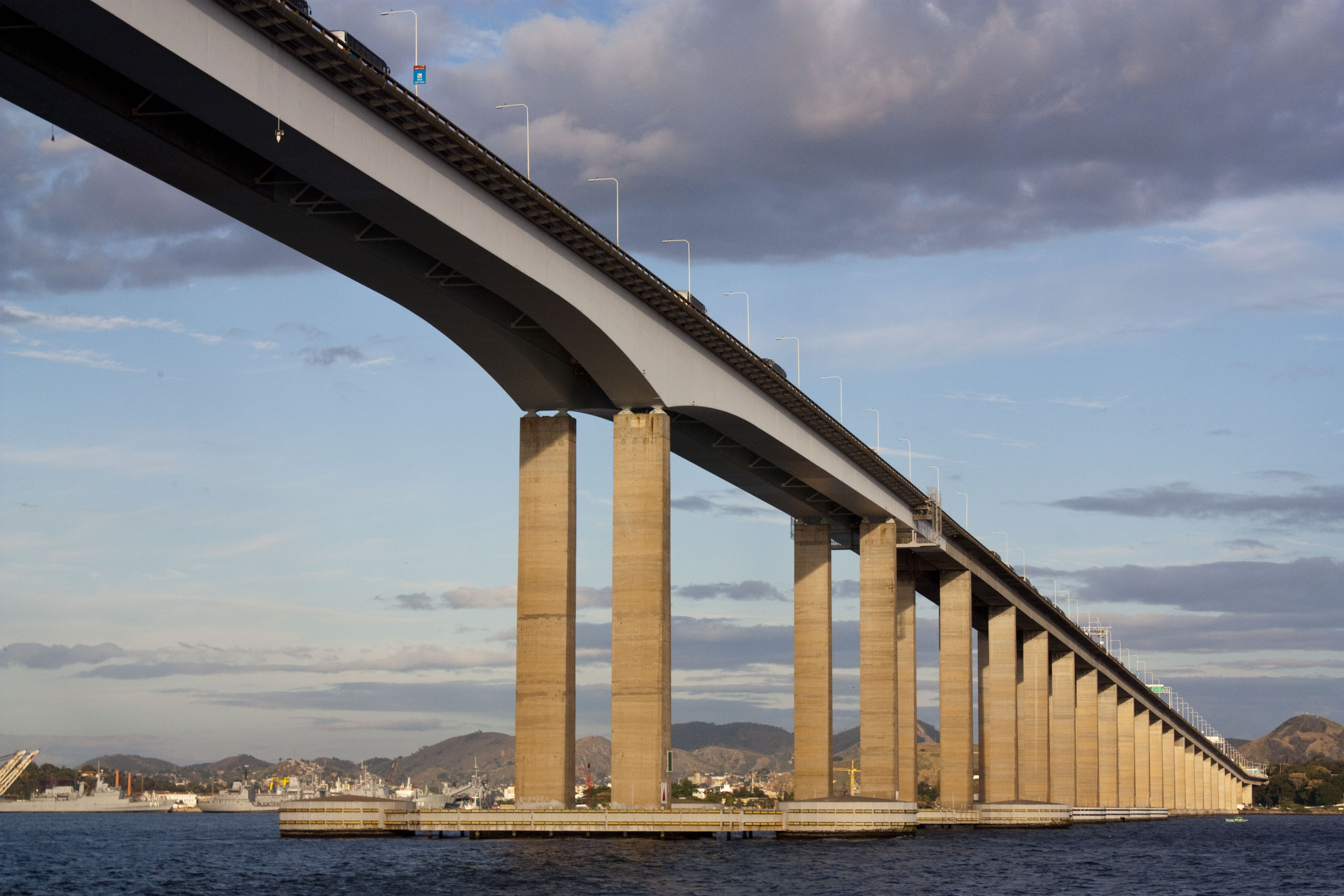
Rio-Niterói Bridge

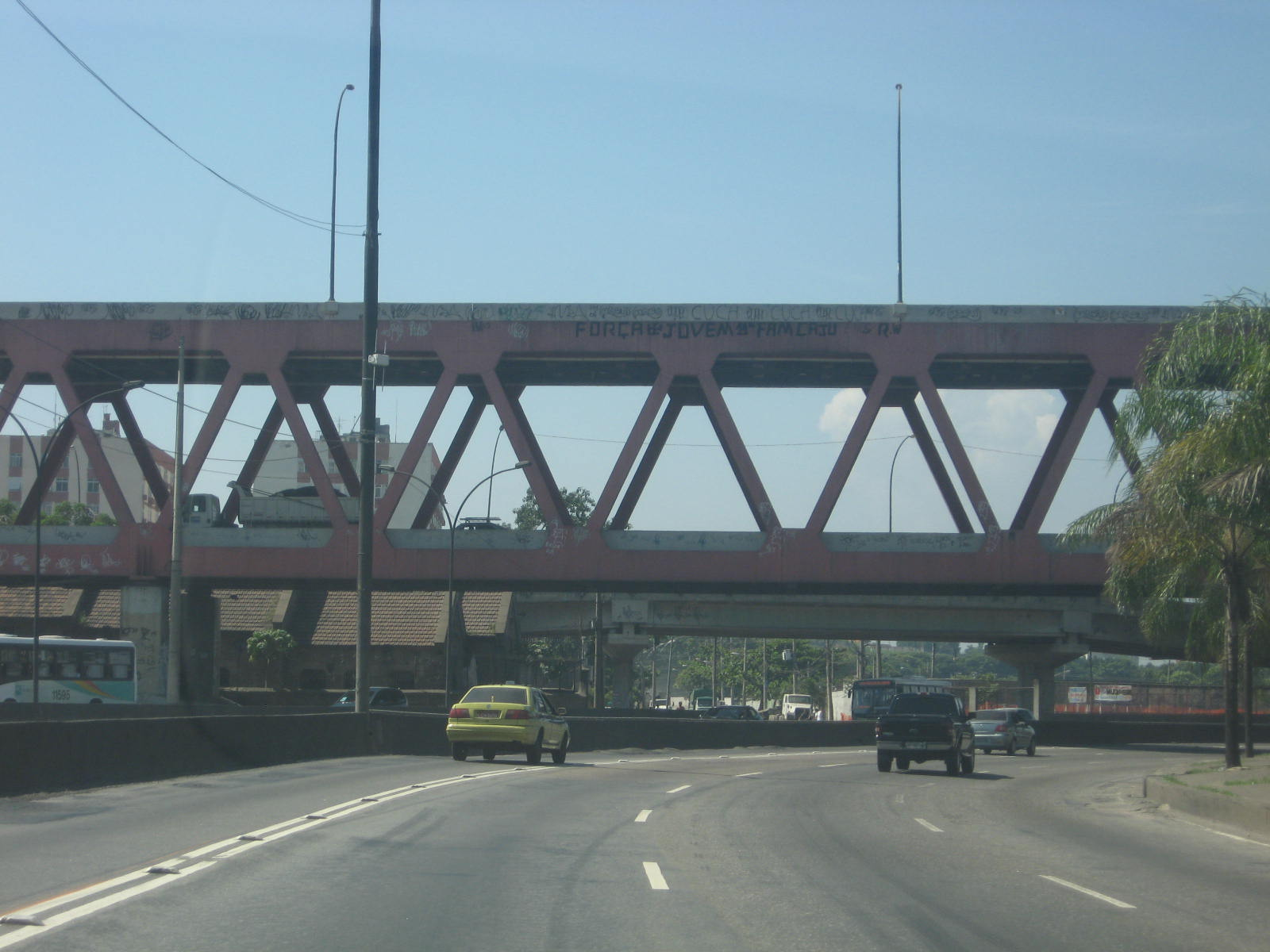
Linha Vermelha

Avenida Brasil (Brazil Avenue) is the longest and busiest highway in Rio de Janeiro, stretching 58 km (36 mi) from the Port area in the city center through the North side to Santa Cruz in the West side and carrying 800,000 vehicles per day. Almost the entire highway is part of BR-101, which continues east along the Rio-Niterói Bridge towards Vitória, Salvador and Recife and west through Itaguaí towards Santos, Curitiba and Florianópolis. Shorter sections of Avenida Brasil are also part of BR-040 (which runs from the Rio de Janeiro Port area to Petrópolis, Belo Horizonte and Brasília), BR-116 (which runs northeast from Rio de Janeiro to Teresópolis, Vitória da Conquista and Fortaleza and northwest to São Paulo, Curitiba and Porto Alegre) and BR-465 (which runs from the neighbourhood of Campo Grande to Seropédica). Avenida Brasil is a critical freight corridor and bottleneck, particularly for the Port of Rio de Janeiro, with over 500 trucks per day using the highway in the morning peak. The 26 km (16 mi) long Transbrasil BRT runs in the middle of Avenida Brasil from Gentileza Intermodal Terminal to Deodoro station and carries 115,000 passengers per day.

The Rio-Niterói Bridge is a 13 km (8 mi) long box girder bridge that runs between the Port of Rio de Janeiro and the Port of Niterói via Mocanguê Island. The bridge, which is part of BR-101, is the only direct road connection between the east and west sides of Guanabara Bay and is therefore a critical traffic bottleneck, carrying 150,000 vehicles per day, including over 7000 trucks. Most of the bridge is 60 m (197 ft) above the water, with the central span rising to 72 m (236 ft) to allow for large ships to pass. There is a toll booth in the eastbound direction.

The Linha Amarela (Yellow Line) highway, officially Avenida Governador Carlos Lacerda, runs 17 km (11 mi) from Fundão Island to Barra da Tijuca via Del Castilho, Méier and Jacarepaguá. It is maintained by LAMSA (Linha Amarela S.A.), which is owned by Invepar, and is one of two tolled roads within city limits. The Yellow Line carries 120,000 vehicles per day. It runs entirely parallel to the Transcarioca BRT.

The Linha Vermelha (Red Line), officially Via Expressa Presidente João Goulart or RJ-071, is a 22 km (14 mi) long highway that runs from Cidade Nova to São João de Meriti via Fundão Island, Galeão International Airport and Duque de Caxias, entirely parallel to Avenida Brasil. There is an 8 km (5 mi) barrier known as the Wall of Shame along the highway in Maré; this was ostensibly built as a noise barrier during the leadup to the 2016 Summer Olympics but is widely considered by local residents to be a way for the city to hide the favela from Galeão International Airport passengers. Trucks are banned from using the highway. The Red Line carries 90,000 vehicles per day.

=== Airports ===
The following airports serve the city of Rio de Janeiro:

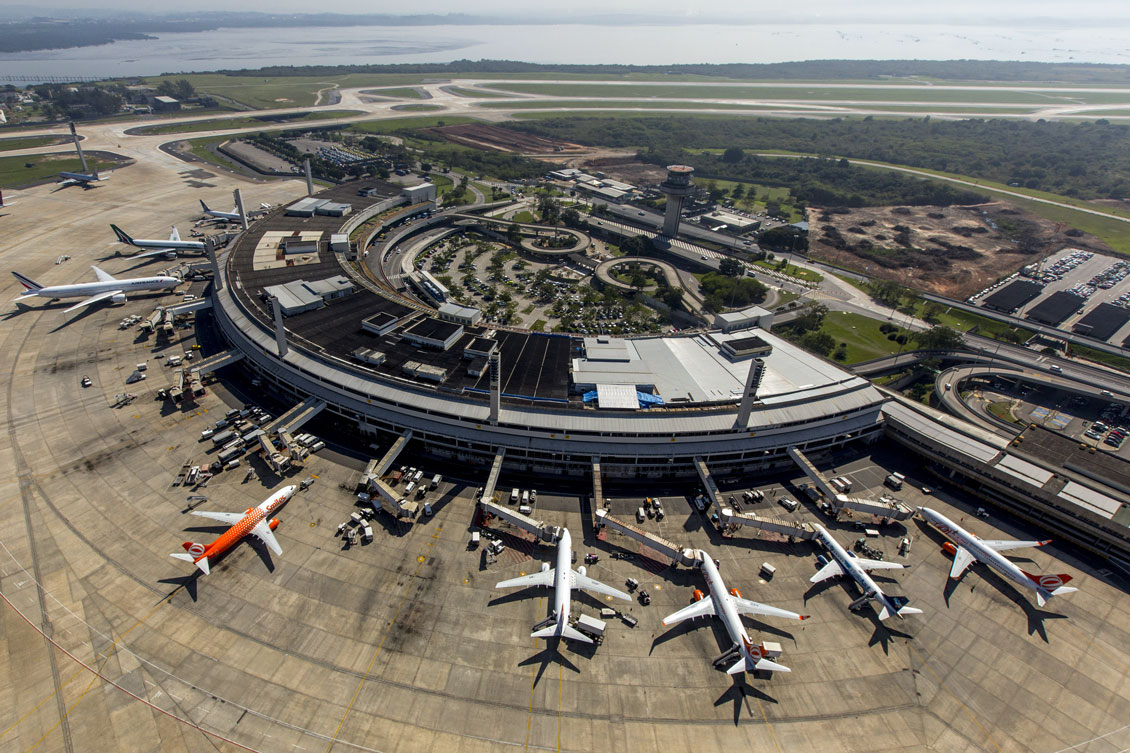
Rio de Janeiro/Galeão International Airport

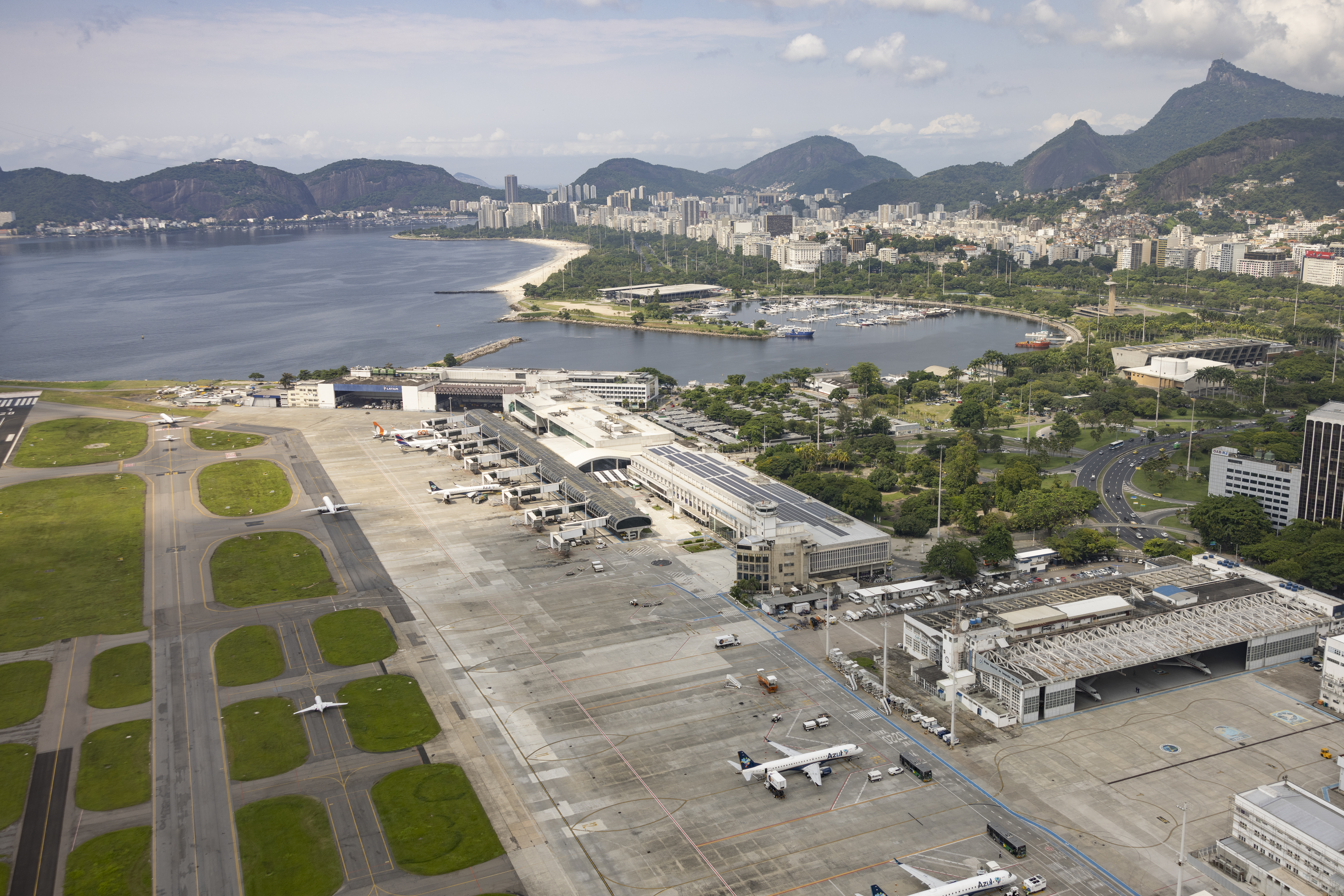
Rio de Janeiro–Santos Dumont Domestic Airport

- Galeão–Antônio Carlos Jobim International Airport: used for all international and most domestic flights. This airport is connected to local and intercity buses and the TransCarioca and TransBrasil BRTs.
- Santos Dumont Airport: used mainly for services to São Paulo, some short and medium-haul domestic flights, and general aviation. As of 2025, the airport's passenger capacity is capped by the federal government at 6.5 million per year. The airport is connected to the city's light rail system, which connects it to several other transport modes in the city center.
- Jacarepaguá–Roberto Marinho Airport: used by general aviation and home to the Aeroclube do Brasil (Brasil Flying club). It also has some short-haul commercial flights. The airport is located in the district of Baixada de Jacarepaguá and is connected to the TransCarioca and TransOlímpica BRTs.

Air Force Bases include:

- Galeão Air Force Base: A Brazilian Air Force airbase, sharing some facilities with Galeão - Antônio Carlos Jobim International Airport;
- Santa Cruz Air Force Base: A Brazilian Air Force airbase. Formerly called Bartolomeu de Gusmão Airport, it was built by the Luftschiffbau Zeppelin. Today it is one of the most important Air Force Bases in Brazil;
- Afonsos Air Force Base: One of the historical Brazilian Air Force airbases. It is also the location of the University of the Air Force (Universidade da Força Aérea), the Museu Aeroespacial, and where air shows take place.

=== Ports ===
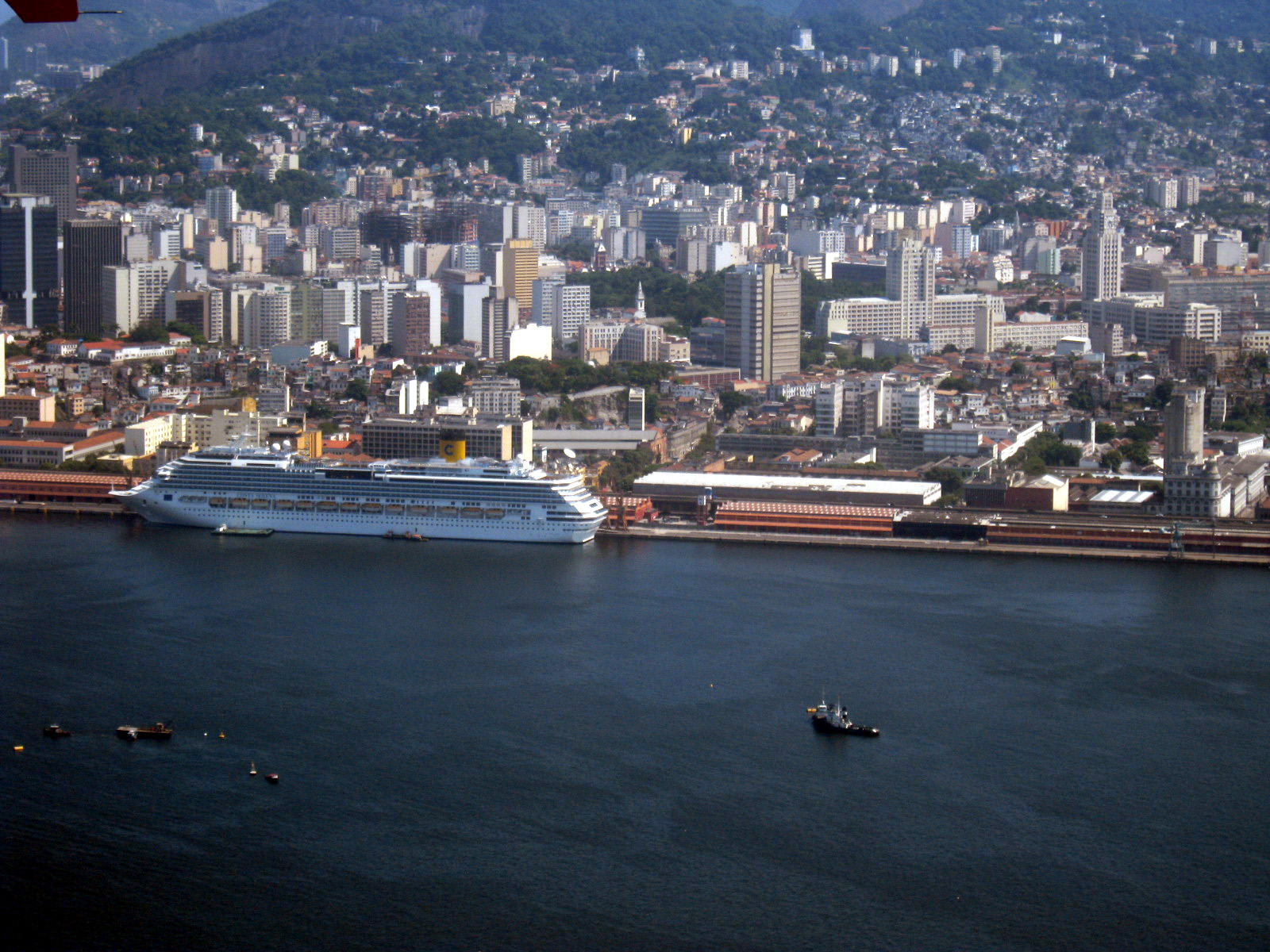
Port of Rio de Janeiro

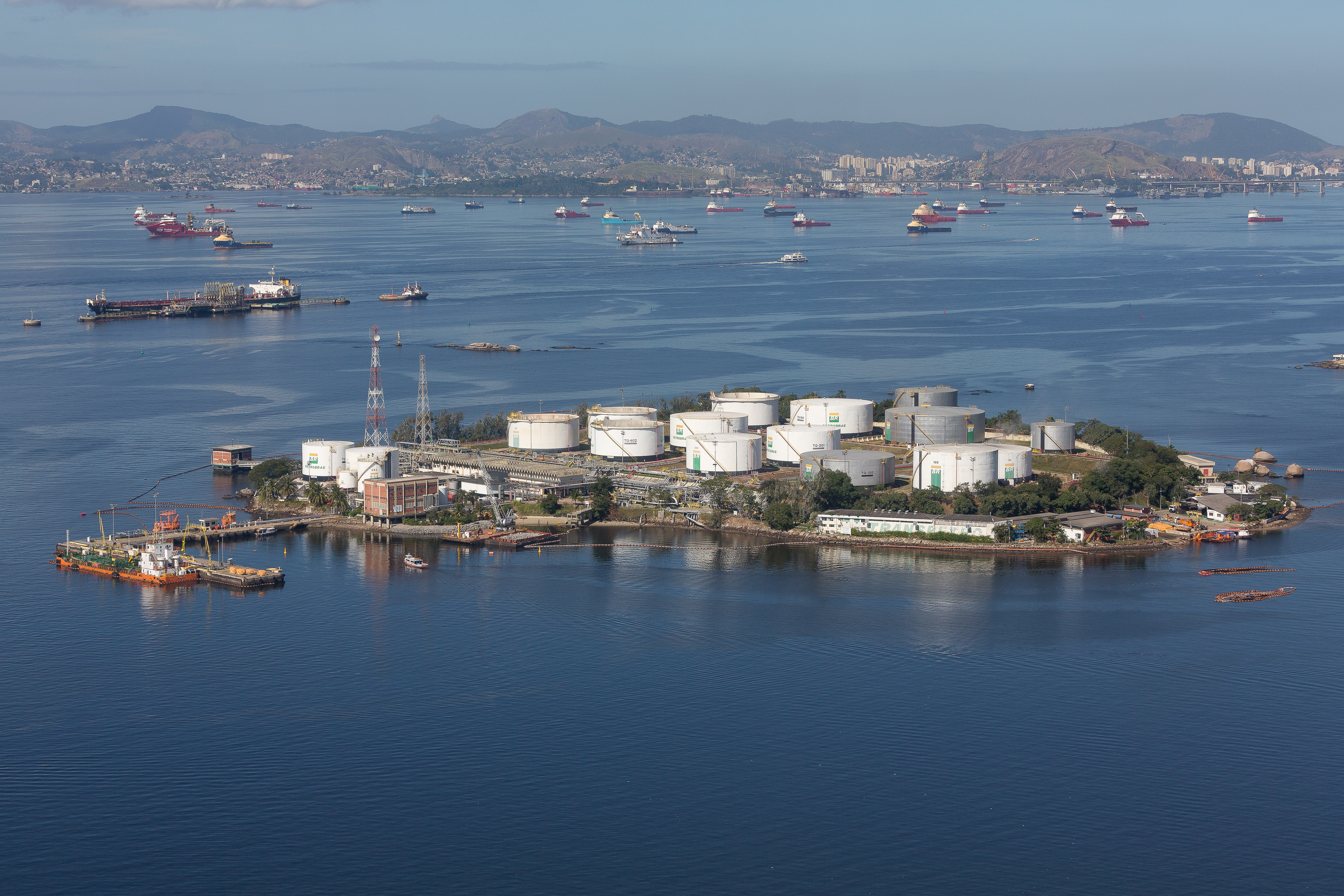
Ilha d'Água Terminal

The Port of Rio de Janeiro is Brazil's tenth busiest publicly-owned port in terms of cargo volume, and it is the main port for cruise vessels. Located in the Zona Central and on the west coast of Guanabara Bay, it primarily serves the Southeastern states of Rio de Janeiro, São Paulo, Minas Gerais, and Espírito Santo. The port is managed overall by the Companhia Docas do Rio de Janeiro, though private companies operate some parts of it. The Port of Rio de Janeiro stretches from Mauá Pier in the east to Caju Wharf in the north and includes three wharves with a total length of 6,740 m (22,110 ft). Gamboa Wharf is 3,042 m (9,980 ft) long and includes 20 berths and 19 warehouses; this wharf is shallower than the others and therefore typically handles wheat on Handysize and Handymax ships. Since Gamboa Wharf includes the cruise ship terminal at Mauá Pier, this also prevents the largest cruise ships from docking in the port. São Cristóvão Wharf is 1,259 m (4,131 ft) long and has 12 berths and two warehouses; the eastern end of this wharf is also shallow enough to restrict shipping operations. Caju Wharf is 2,439 m (8,002 ft) long and includes 6 berths, 7 warehouses and 24 storage tanks, with 5,000 m^{3} (180,000 cubic feet) of storage tank space reserved for sodium hydroxide and the remaining 12,000 m^{3} (420,000 cubic feet) reserved for petroleum products. There is also a group of storage tanks just outside the port with a total capacity of 22,000 tonnes and pipelines that connect them to São Cristóvão Wharf. The berths at Caju Wharf are large enough for ships of up to 349 m (1,145 ft) length overall.

In 2024, the Port of Rio de Janeiro handled 15.5 million tonnes of cargo, 11.8 million tonnes of which were containerized into 937,000 TEUs. In addition to container cargo, the port also handled 1.1 million tonnes of iron and steel products, 873,000 tonnes of petroleum products (not including crude oil), 444,000 tonnes of wheat, 370,000 tonnes of crude oil and 205,000 tonnes of motor vehicles. 10.2 million tonnes of cargo were moved internationally, 5.2 million tonnes were moved via short-sea shipping, and 0.075 million tonnes were moved through inland navigation. The Port of Rio de Janeiro also moved 327,000 passengers on 36 cruise ships making 107 calls during the 2024/25 cruise season.

In addition to the Port of Rio de Janeiro, the city also has ten private port facilities, nine of which are on Guanabara Bay and one of which is on Sepetiba Bay. The Guanabara Bay port facilities collectively handled 16.6 million tonnes of petroleum products in 2024 and no other cargo. 15.8 million tonnes of this cargo were shipped through the Ilha d'Água Terminal, which is owned by Transpetro and has a pipeline connected to REDUC (Duque de Caxias Refinery). 14 million tonnes of cargo were moved through short-sea shipping and 2.6 million tonnes were moved internationally. The port on Sepetiba Bay, which is owned by Ternium, moved 7.3 million tonnes of cargo in 2024 to support its steel mill in Santa Cruz, almost all of it internationally. This port moved 3.2 million tonnes of iron and steel, 2.4 million tonnes of coal, 0.8 million tonnes of limestone, 0.4 million tonnes of mineral oils, 0.4 million tonnes of iron ore and 0.2 million tonnes of petroleum coke in 2024.

=== Water and sewage ===
The water supply of Rio de Janeiro and the Baixada Fluminense is sourced through the interconnected Guandu, Ribeirão das Lajes and Acari water supply systems. The Guandu water supply system, which uses water diverted from the Paraíba do Sul and Piraí Rivers to the Guandu River, includes the largest water treatment plant in the world, with a throughput of 43 m^{3} (1,500 cubic feet) per second. The Ribeirão das Lajes system uses water diverted from the Piraí River (but not the Paraíba do Sul River) to the Ribeirão das Lajes River and supplies 5.1 m^{3} (180 cubic feet) of water per second. The Acari system uses five raw water collection points in the Tinguá Biological Reserve and supplies 3 m^{3} (110 cubic feet) of water per second. Rio de Janeiro's water security is threatened by its dependence on a single source, climate change and raw water pollution, particularly in the Guandu River.

Paquetá Island, unlike the rest of Rio de Janeiro City, has its water supplied from the Imunana-Laranjal water supply system, which uses water sourced from the Macacu and Guapiaçú Rivers and also supplies the Leste Fluminense. This system treats 7 m^{3} (250 cubic feet) of water per second.

National policy changes in 2020–2021 for the universalization of sanitation kept the 2007 policy defining the municipality as the provider of sanitation service, delegating the organization, supervision, and provision of services to third parties. The National Water and Basic Sanitation Agency (ANA) is responsible for the setting standards regulating basic public sanitation services. In 2021–2022, distribution and treatment of sewage of the Rio de Janeiro State Water and Sewage Company (CEDAE) was divided into four blocks and auctioned to Aegea (Águas do Rio) and Iguá; CEDAE remained in control of water collection and treatment of drinking water. The Rio de Janeiro State Environmental Institute (INEA) has primary responsibility for water pollution monitoring and enforcement.

As of 2021 only 65% of sewage was properly treated, leaving 35% to be improperly discharged. As of 2022 there were at least 400 illicit sewage disposal points in the drainage network.

=== Solid waste ===
Solid waste management in Rio de Janeiro is done by the Companhia Municipal de Limpeza Urbana (Municipal Urban Cleaning Company or Comlurb), which is the largest municipal waste management company in Latin America. Rio de Janeiro produces over 3.2 million tonnes of solid waste per year. After being collected throughout the city, solid waste is sent through one of five waste transfer stations and then on to a sanitary landfill in Seropédica, which produces 24,000 m³ of biogas and 5,000 m³ of biomethane per hour; leachate is also treated and used to produce over 60m³ of distilled water per hour. Despite 40% of the city's waste being made of recyclable materials, only 2% of it is actually recycled.

== Culture ==
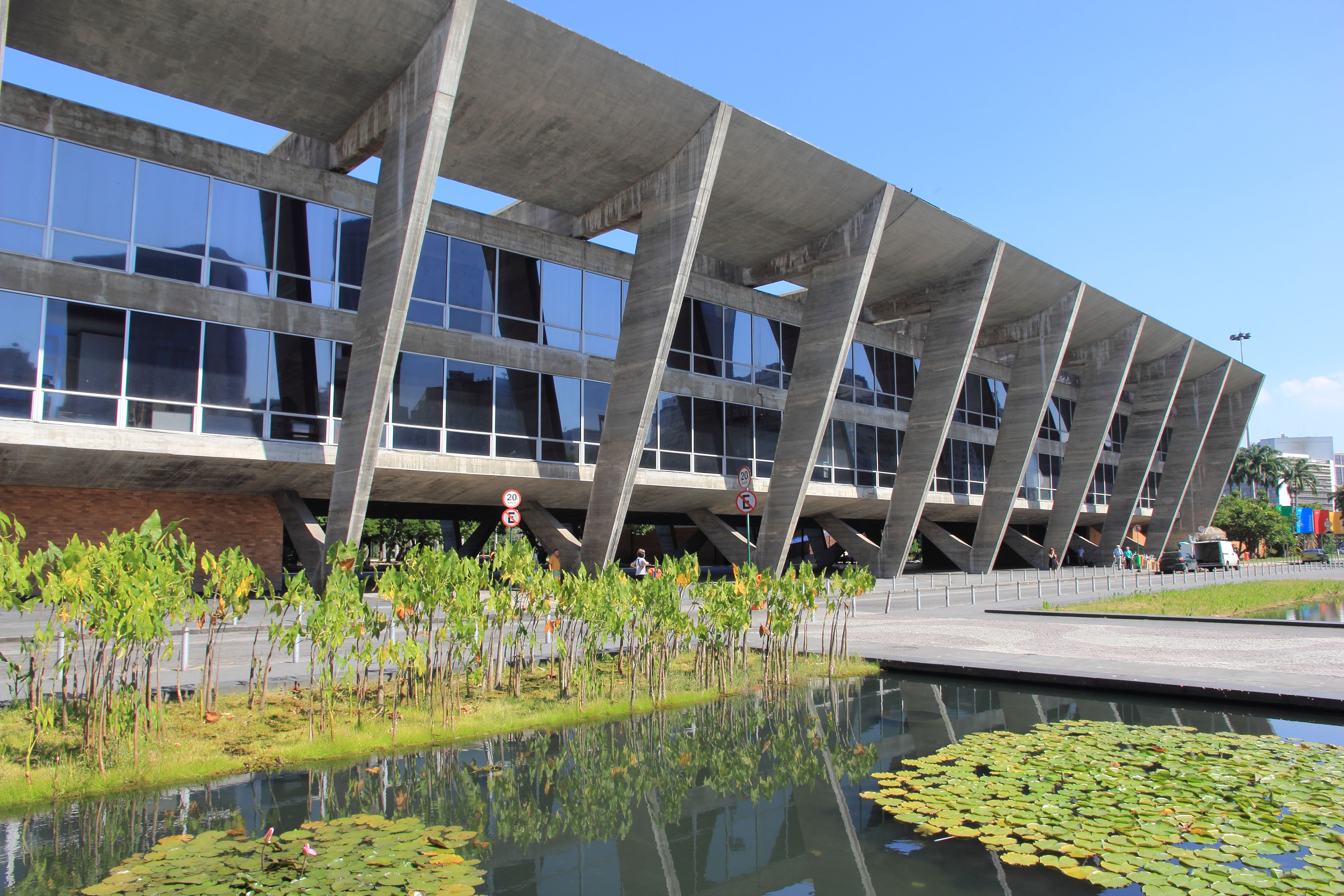
Museum of Modern Art

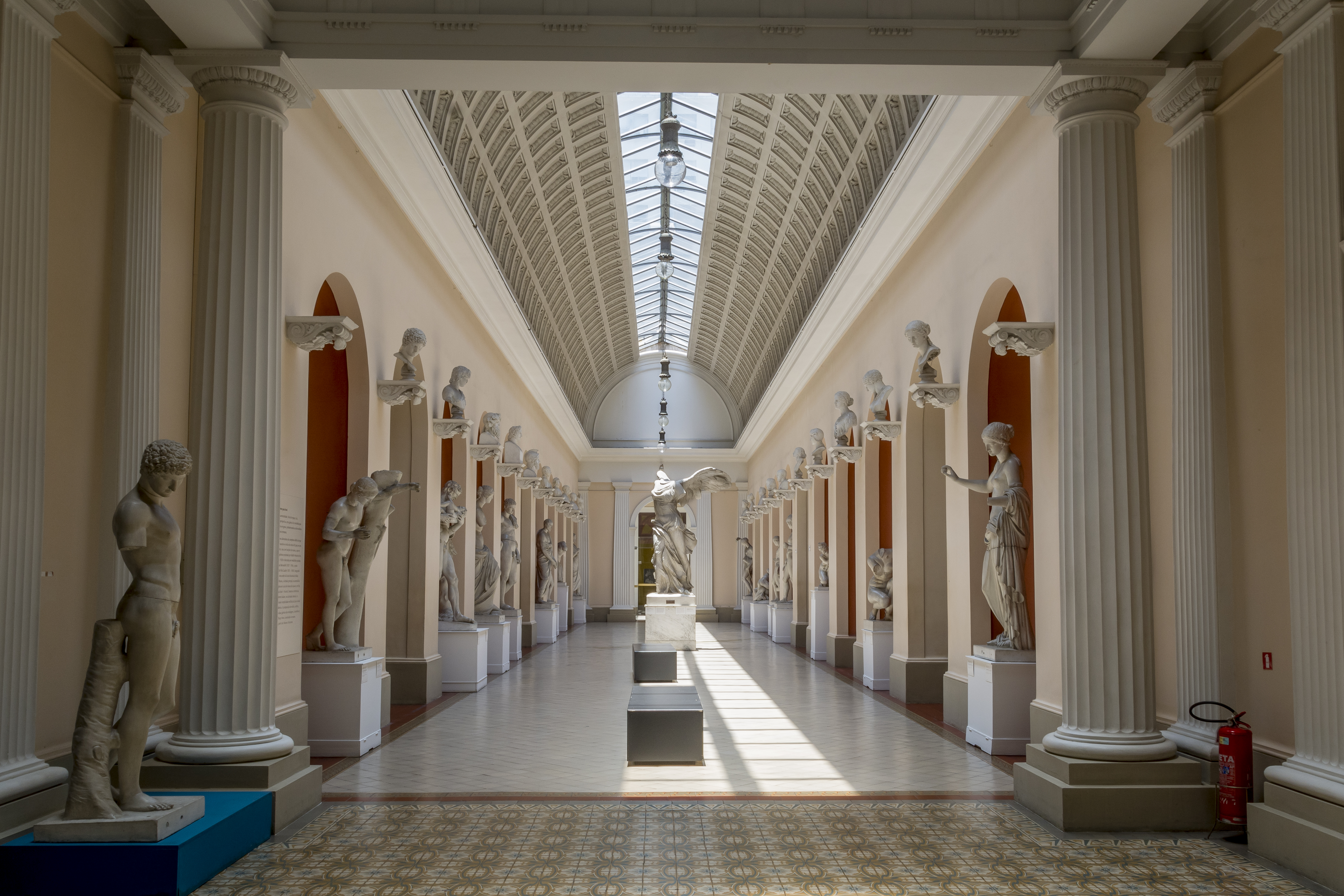
National Museum of Fine Arts

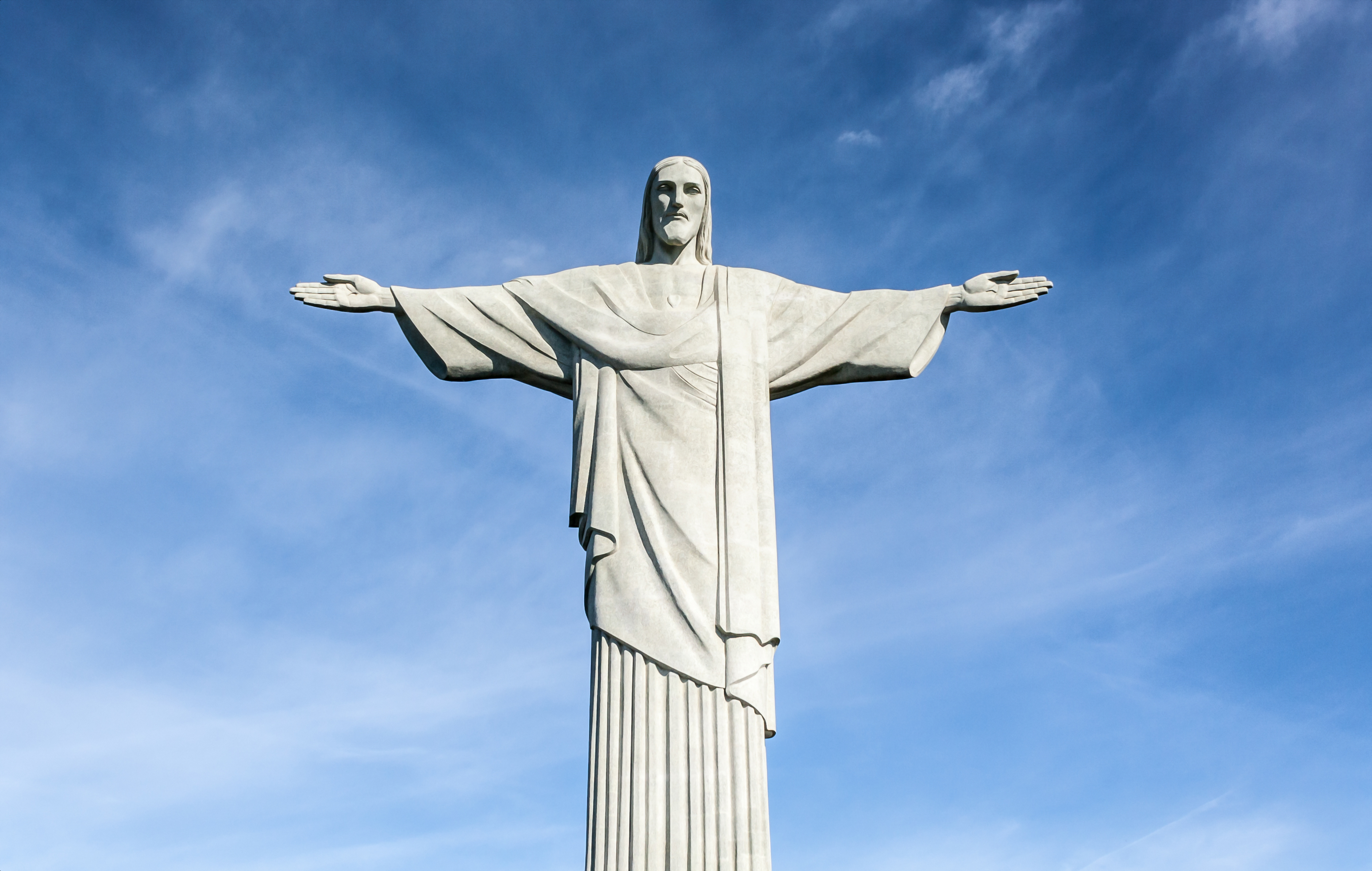
Christ the Redeemer

Rio de Janeiro is a main cultural hub in Brazil. Its architecture embraces churches and buildings dating from the 16th to the 19th centuries, blending with the world-renowned designs of the 20th century. Rio was home to the Portuguese Imperial family and capital of the country for many years, and was influenced by Portuguese, English, and French architecture.

Rio de Janeiro has inherited a strong cultural role from the past. In the late 19th century, there were sessions held of the first Brazilian film, and since then, several production cycles have spread out, eventually placing Rio at the forefront of experimental and national cinema. The Rio de Janeiro International Film Festival has been held annually since 1999.

Rio currently brings together the main production centers of Brazilian television. Major international films set in Rio de Janeiro include Blame it on Rio; the James Bond film Moonraker; the Oscar award-winning, critically acclaimed Central Station by Walter Salles, who is also one of Brazil's best-known directors; and the Oscar award-winning historical drama, Black Orpheus, which depicted the early days of Carnaval in Rio de Janeiro. Internationally distributed Brazilian-made movies illustrating a darker side of Rio de Janeiro include Elite Squad and City of God.

Rio has many important cultural landmarks, such as the Biblioteca Nacional (National Library), one of the largest libraries in the world with collections totaling more than 9 million items; the Theatro Municipal; the National Museum of Fine Arts; the Carmen Miranda Museum; the Rio de Janeiro Botanical Garden; the Parque Lage; the Quinta da Boa Vista; the Imperial Square; the Brazilian Academy of Letters; the Museu de Arte Moderna do Rio de Janeiro; and the Natural History Museum.

=== Literature ===
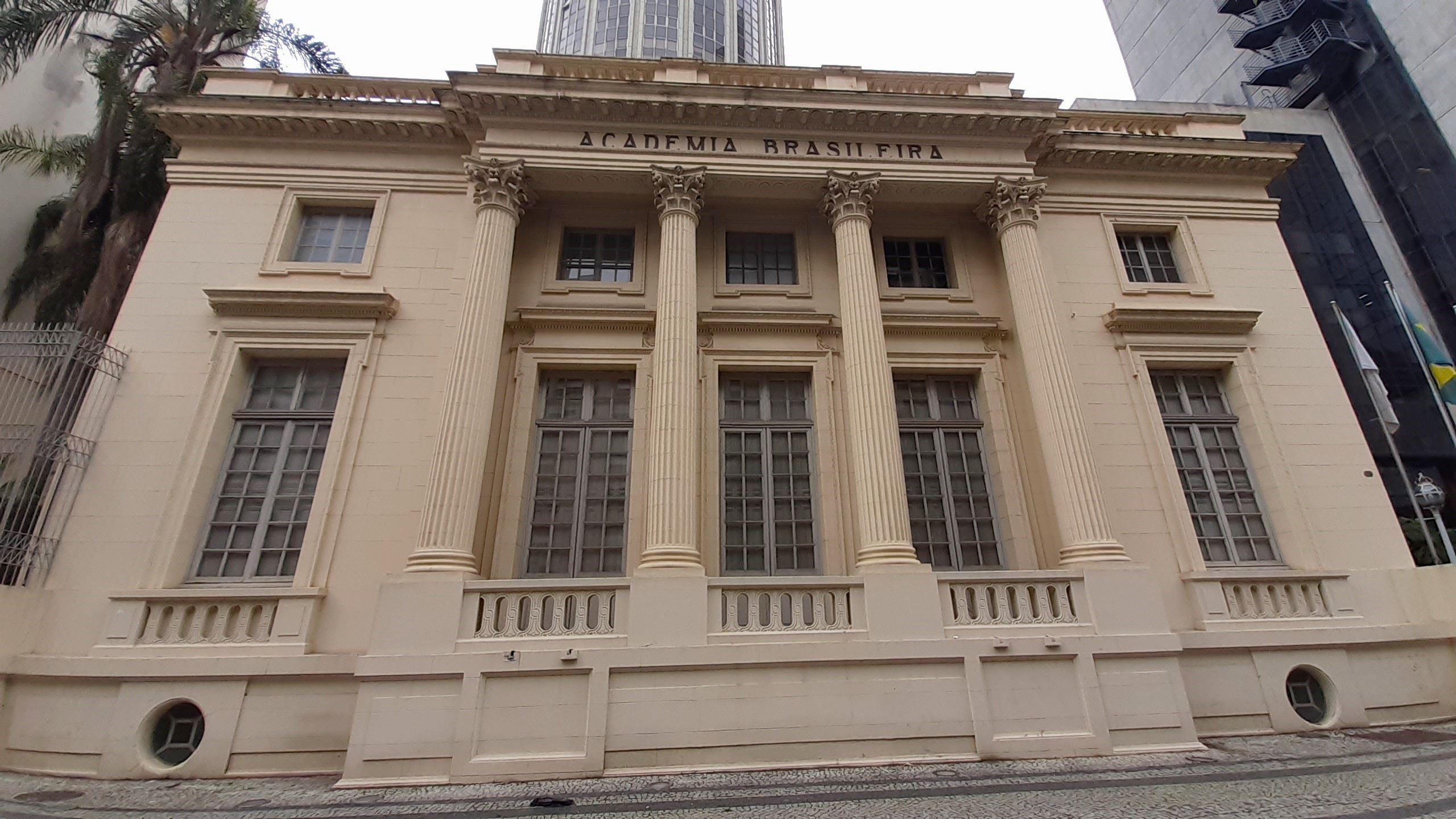
Brazilian Academy of Letters

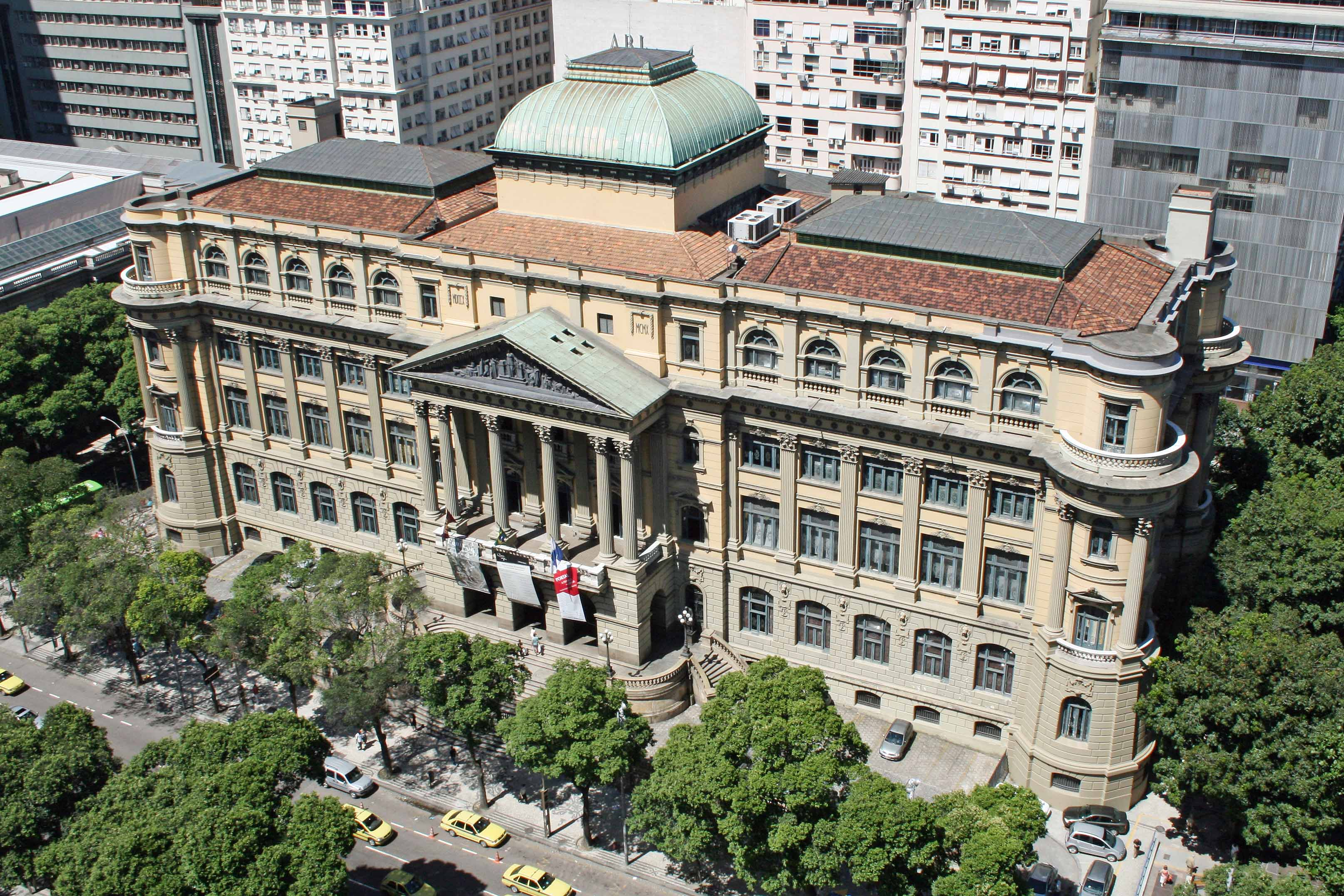
National Library of Brazil

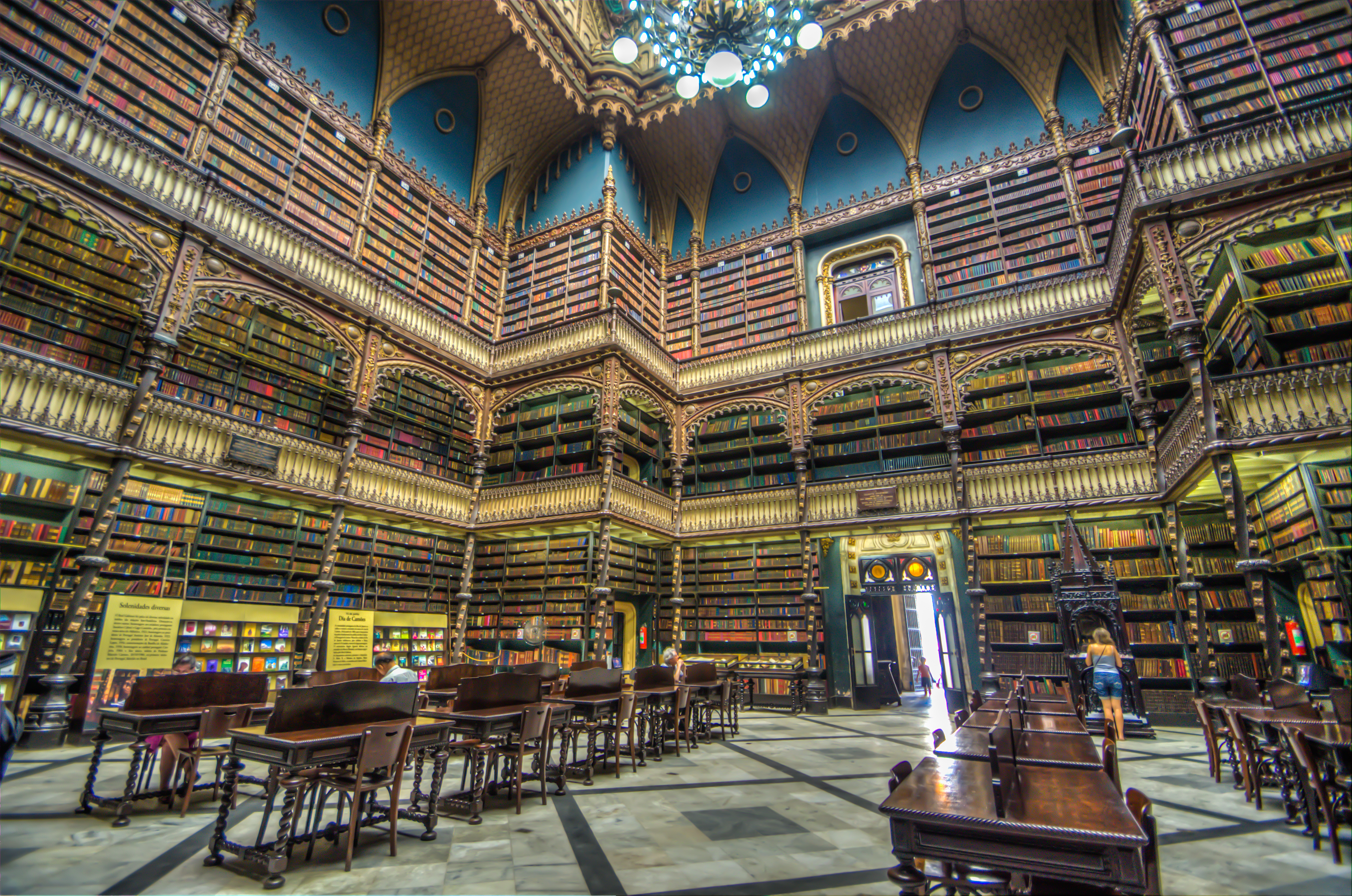
Royal Portuguese Cabinet of Reading

After Brazilian independence from Portugal in 1822, Rio de Janeiro quickly developed a European-style bourgeois cultural life, including numerous newspapers, in which most 19th-century novels were initially published in serial form. Joaquim Manuel de Macedo's A Moreninha (1844) was perhaps the first successful novel in Brazil and inaugurates a recurrent 19th-century theme: a romantic relationship between idealistic young people in spite of the cruelties of social fortune.

The first notable work of realism focusing on the urban lower-middle class is Manuel Antônio de Almeida's Memórias de um sargento de milícias (1854), which presents a series of picaresque scenes and evokes the transformation of a town into a city with suggestive nostalgia. Romantic and realist modes both flourished through the late 19th century and often overlapped within works.

Machado de Assis is from Rio de Janeiro, and is widely regarded as the greatest writer of Brazilian literature and considered the founder of Realism in Brazil, with the publication of The Posthumous Memoirs of Bras Cubas (1881). He commented on and criticized the political and social events of the city and country, such as the abolition of slavery in 1888 and the transition from Empire to Republic, with his numerous chronicles published in newspapers of the time. Many of his short stories and novels, like Quincas Borba (1891) and Dom Casmurro (1899), are placed in Rio. The headquarters of the Brazilian Academy of Letters is based in Rio de Janeiro. It was satirized by the novelist Jorge Amado in Pen, Sword, Camisole. Amado himself went on to be one of the 40 members of the academy.

The Biblioteca Nacional (National Library of Brazil) ranks as one of the largest libraries in the world. It is also the largest library in all of Latin America. Located in Cinelândia, the National Library was created by the King of Portugal, in 1810. As with many of Rio de Janeiro's cultural monuments, the library was originally off-limits to the general public. The most valuable collections in the library include: 4,300 items donated by Barbosa Machado including a precious collection of rare brochures detailing the History of Portugal and Brazil; 2,365 items from the 17th and 18th centuries that were previously owned by Antônio de Araújo de Azevedo, the "Count of Barca", including the 125-volume set of prints "Le Grand Théâtre de l'Univers;" a collection of documents regarding the Jesuítica Province of Paraguay and the "Region of Prata;" and the Teresa Cristina Maria Collection, donated by Emperor Pedro II. The collection contains 48,236 items. Individual items of special interest include a rare first edition of Os Lusíadas by Luis de Camões, published in 1584; two copies of the Mogúncia Bible; and a first edition of Handel's Messiah.

The Real Gabinete Português de Leitura (Portuguese Royal Reading Library) is located at Rua Luís de Camões, in the Centro (Downtown). The institution was founded in 1837 by a group of forty-three Portuguese immigrants, political refugees, to promote culture among the Portuguese community in the then capital of the Empire. The history of the Brazilian Academy of Letters is linked to the Real Gabinete, since some of the early meetings of the academy were held there.

=== Music ===
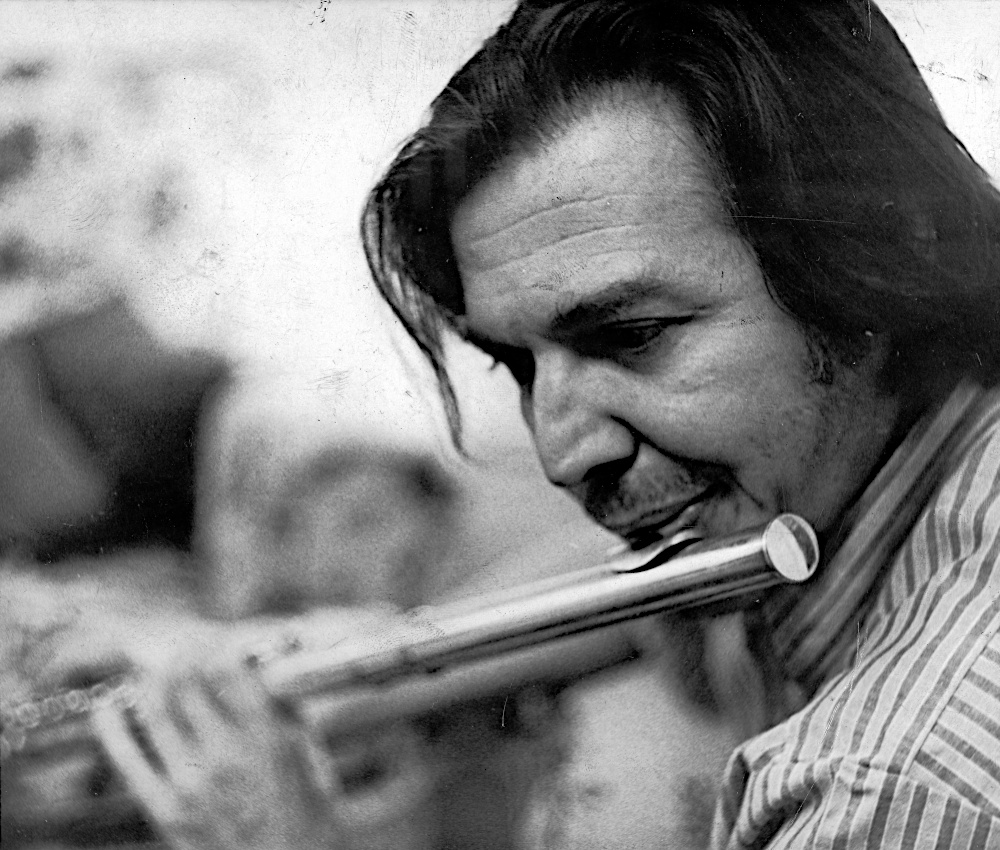
Tom Jobim in 1972. Considered one of the great exponents of Brazilian music, Jobim internationalized bossa nova with the help of important American artists.

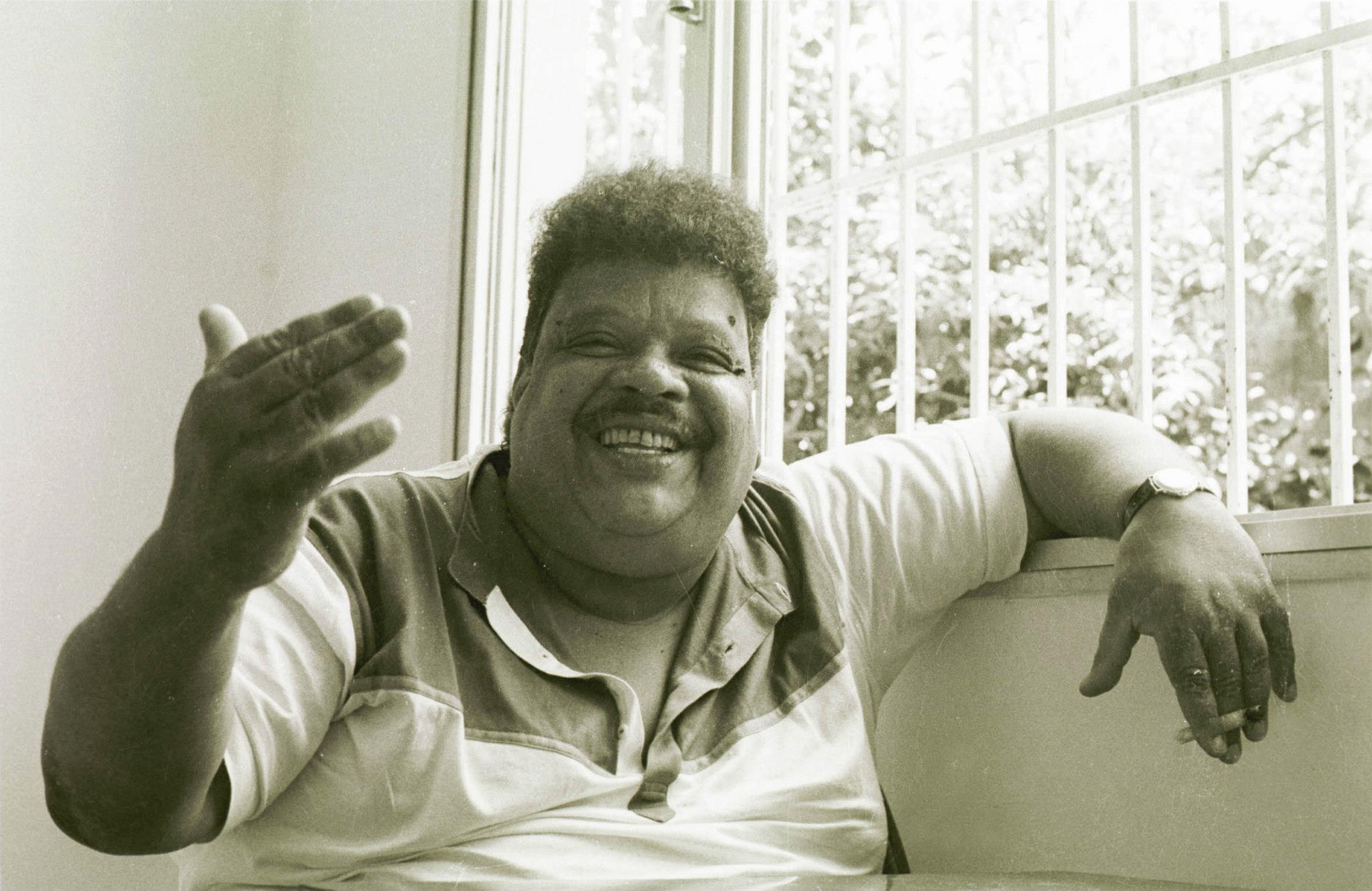
Tim Maia, the greatest representative of soul music in the country's history, from Rio de Janeiro

The official song of Rio de Janeiro is "Cidade Maravilhosa", which means "marvelous city". The song is considered the civic anthem of Rio, and is always the favorite song during Rio's Carnival in February. Rio de Janeiro and São Paulo are considered the center of the urban music movement in Brazil.

"Rio was popularized by the hit song "The Girl from Ipanema", composed by Antônio Carlos Jobim and Vinicius de Moraes and recorded by Astrud Gilberto and João Gilberto, Frank Sinatra, and Ella Fitzgerald. It is also the main key song of the bossa nova, a music genre born in Rio. A genre unique to Rio and Brazil as a whole is Funk Carioca. While samba music continues to act as the national unifying agent in Rio, Funk Carioca found a strong community following in Brazil. With its genesis in the 1970s as the modern black pop music from the United States, it evolved in the 1990s to describe a variety of electronic music associated with the current US black music scene, including hip-hop, modern soul, and house music."

Brazil's return to democracy in 1985 allowed for a new music expression which promoted creativity and experimentation in expressive culture, in a wave of Rock'n'roll that swept the 80s. Lobão emerged as the most legendary rocker in Brazil. Commercial and cultural imports from Europe and North America have often influenced Brazil's own cultural output. For example, the hip-hop that has stemmed from New York is localized into forms of musical production such as Funk Carioca and Brazilian hip-hop. Bands from Rio de Janeiro also influenced the mid-to-late development of the Punk in Brazil, and that of Brazilian thrash metal. Democratic renewal also allowed for the recognition and acceptance of this diversification of Brazilian culture.

Some of the best artists in the history of Brazilian popular music hail from Rio de Janeiro, including aforementioned Lobão, Tim Maia, Agepê, Emílio Santiago, Carlos Lyra, Sandra de Sá, Erasmo Carlos, Wilson Simonal, Cazuza, Ivan Lins, Marcos Valle, Jorge Ben Jor and Anitta.

=== Theater ===
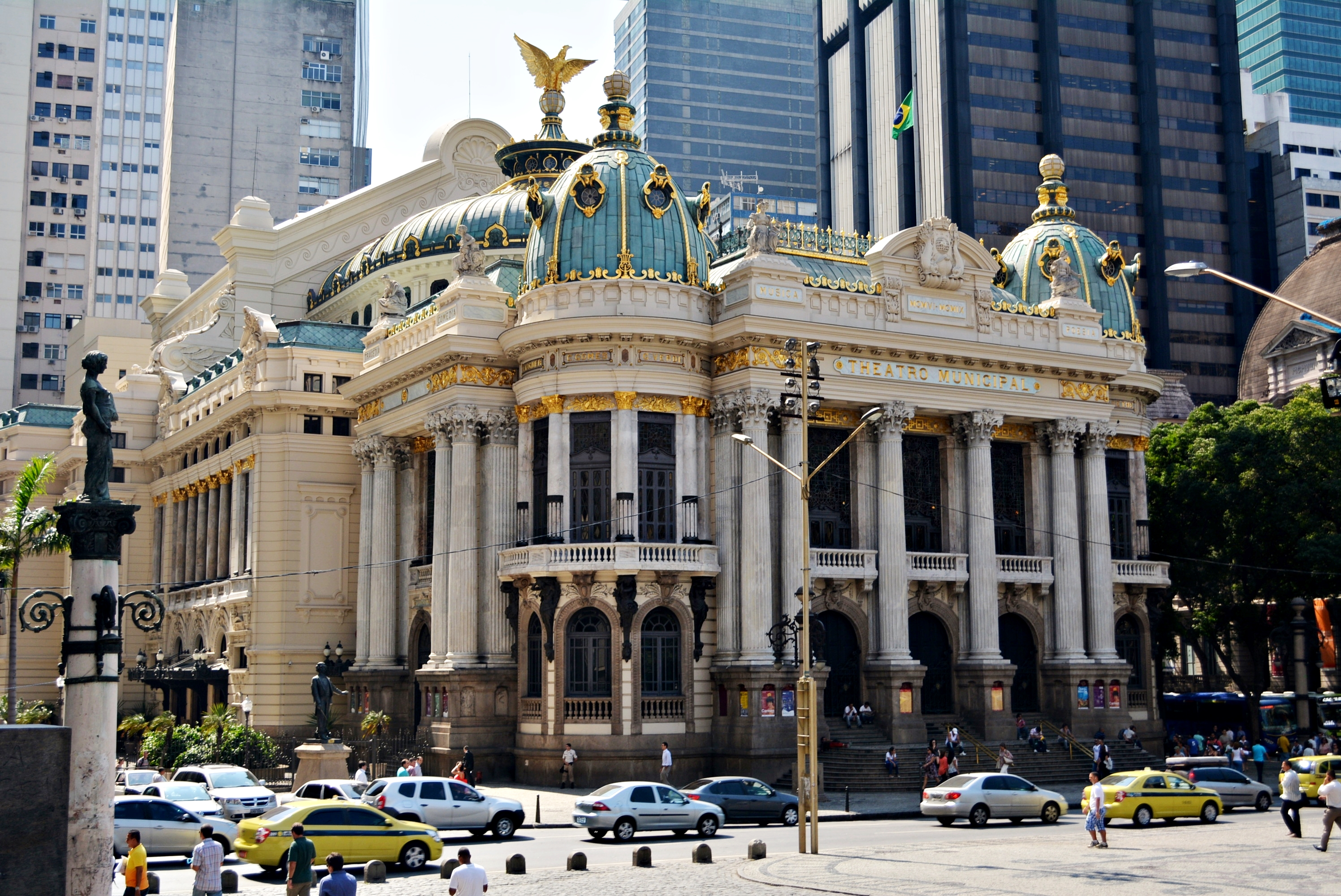
Municipal Theater of Rio de Janeiro

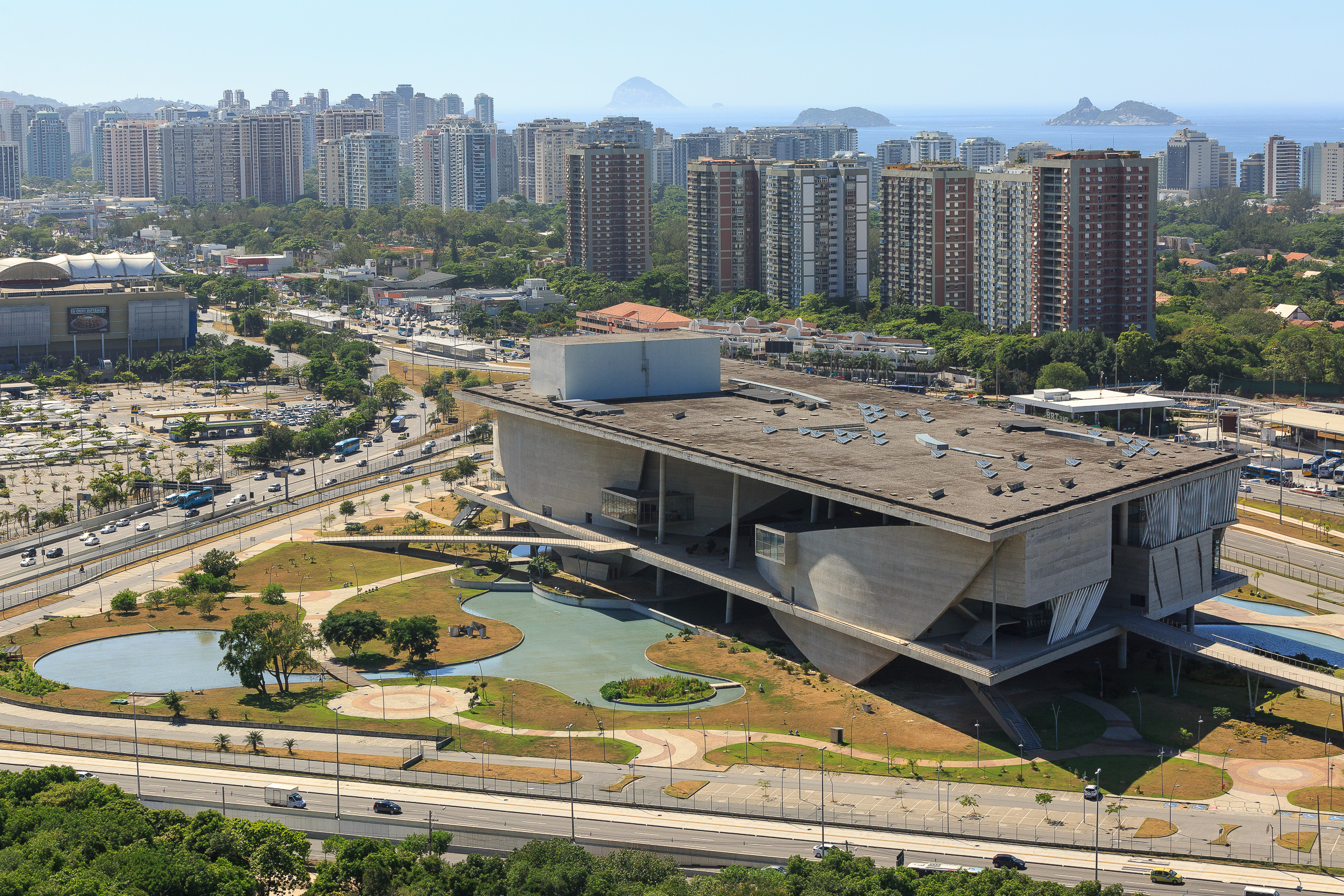
City of Arts

Rio de Janeiro's Theatro Municipal is one of the most attractive buildings in the central area of the city. Home of one of the largest stages in Latin America and one of Brazil's best-known venues for opera, ballet, and classical music, the building was inspired by the Palais Garnier, home of the Paris Opera. Construction of the Theatro Municipal began in 1905 following the designs of the architect Francisco Pereira Passos. The statues on the top, of two women representing Poetry and Music, are by Rodolfo Bernardelli, and the interior is rich with furnishings and fine paintings. Inaugurated in 1909, the Teatro Municipal has close to 1,700 seats. Its interior includes turn-of-the-century stained glass from France, ceilings of rose-colored marble, and a 1,000 pound crystal bead chandelier surrounded by a painting of the "Dance of the Hours". The exterior walls of the building are dotted with inscriptions bearing the names of famous Brazilians as well as many other international celebrities.

Cidade das Artes (City of Arts) is a cultural complex in Barra da Tijuca in the Southwest Zone of Rio de Janeiro, which was originally planned to open in 2004. Formally known as "Cidade da Música" (City of Music), it was finally inaugurated at the beginning of 2013. The project will host the Brazilian Symphony Orchestra, becoming a main center for music, as well as the largest modern concert hall in South America, with 1,780 seats. The complex spans approximately 90×10^{3} m^{2} (1×10^{6} ft^{2}) and also features a chamber music hall, three theaters, and 12 rehearsal rooms. From the terrace, there is a panoramic view of the zone. The building was designed by the French architect Christian de Portzamparc, and construction was funded by the city of Rio de Janeiro.

A series of covered theaters collectively known as Lona Cultural, administered by the city's Municipal Secretary of Culture, serve throughout the city as venues for cultural activities such as concerts, plays, workshops, art and craft fairs, and courses.

=== Events ===
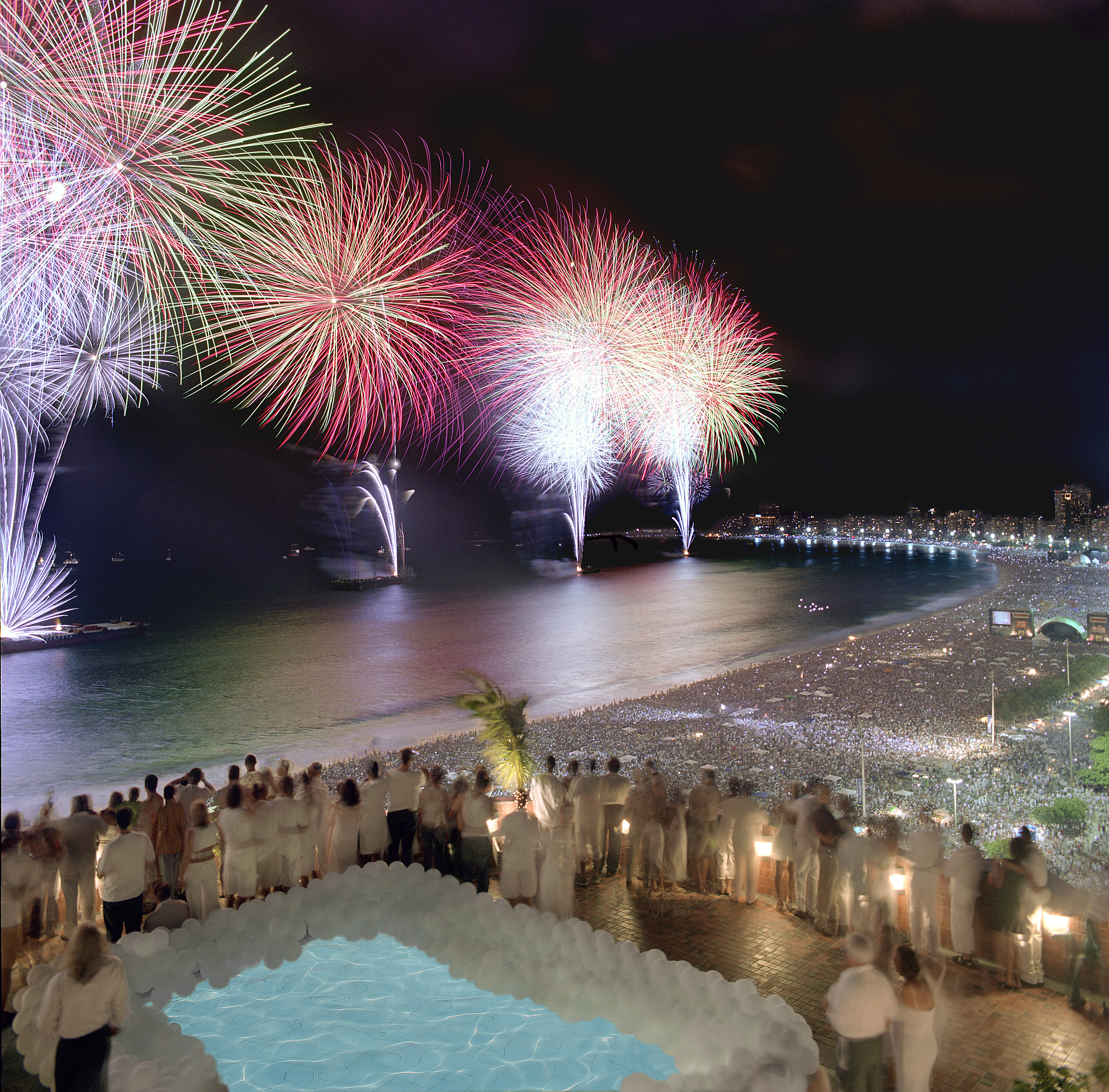
New Year's Eve fireworks at Copacabana Beach

Every 31 December, 2.5 million people gather at Copacabana Beach to celebrate New Year's in Rio de Janeiro. The crowd, mostly dressed in white, celebrates all night at the hundreds of different shows and events along the beach. It is the second-largest celebration, only next to the Carnival. People celebrate the New Year by sharing chilled champagne. It is considered good luck to shake the champagne bottle and spray it around at midnight. Chilled champagne adds to the spirit of the festivities. In January 2026, Rio de Janeiro was awarded the Guinness world record for the largest New Year's Eve celebration by a city.

Rio Carnival is an annual celebration in the Roman Catholic tradition that allows merry-making and red meat consumption before the more sober 40 days of Lent penance, which culminates with Holy or Passion Week and Easter. The French or German courts probably influenced the tradition of Carnaval parades, and the custom was brought by the Portuguese or Brazilian Imperial families who had French and Austrian German ancestors. Up until the time of the marchinhas, the revelry was more of a high-class and Caucasian-led event. The influence of the African-Brazilian drums and music became more noticeable from the first half of the 20th century. Rio de Janeiro has many Carnaval choices, including the samba school (Escolas de Samba) parades in the sambadrome exhibition center and the popular blocos de carnaval, street revelry, which parade in almost every corner of the city. In 1840, the first Carnival was celebrated with a masked ball. As years passed, adorned floats and costumed revelers became a tradition among the celebrants. Carnival is known as a historic root of Brazilian music.

Rock in Rio is a music festival conceived by entrepreneur Roberto Medina for the first time in 1985, and since its creation, recognized as the largest music festival in the Latin world and the largest in the world, with 1.5 million people attending the first event, 700,000 attending the second and fourth, about 1.2 million attending the third, and about 350,000 people attending each of the 3 Lisbon events. It was originally organized in Rio de Janeiro, from where the name comes, and has become a world-level event and, in 2004, had its first edition abroad in Lisbon, Portugal, before Madrid, Spain, and Las Vegas, United States. The festival is considered the eighth best in the world by the specialized site Fling Festival.

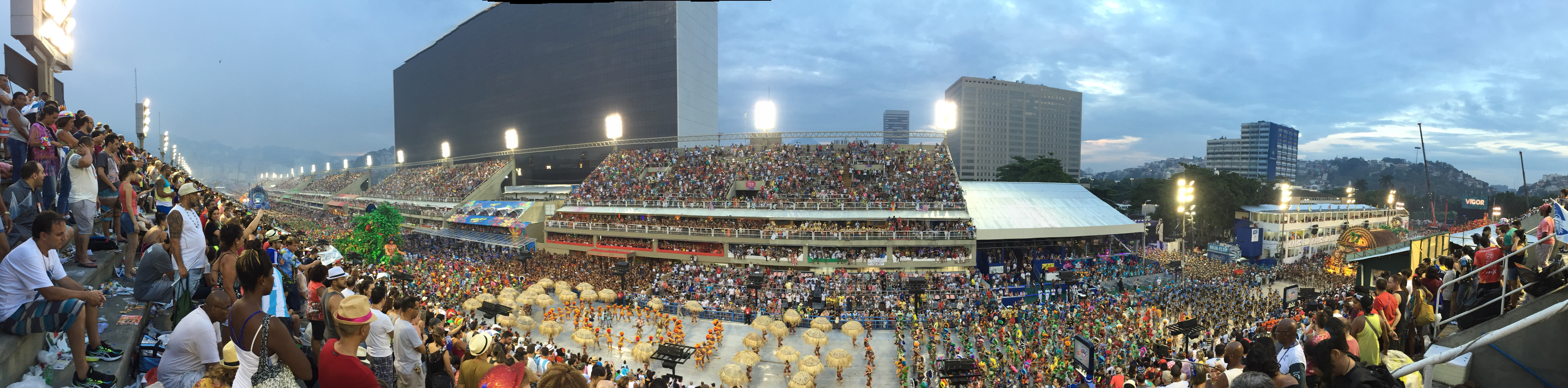
Samba Parade at the Sambódromo (Sambadrome) during the Rio Carnival

=== Sports ===
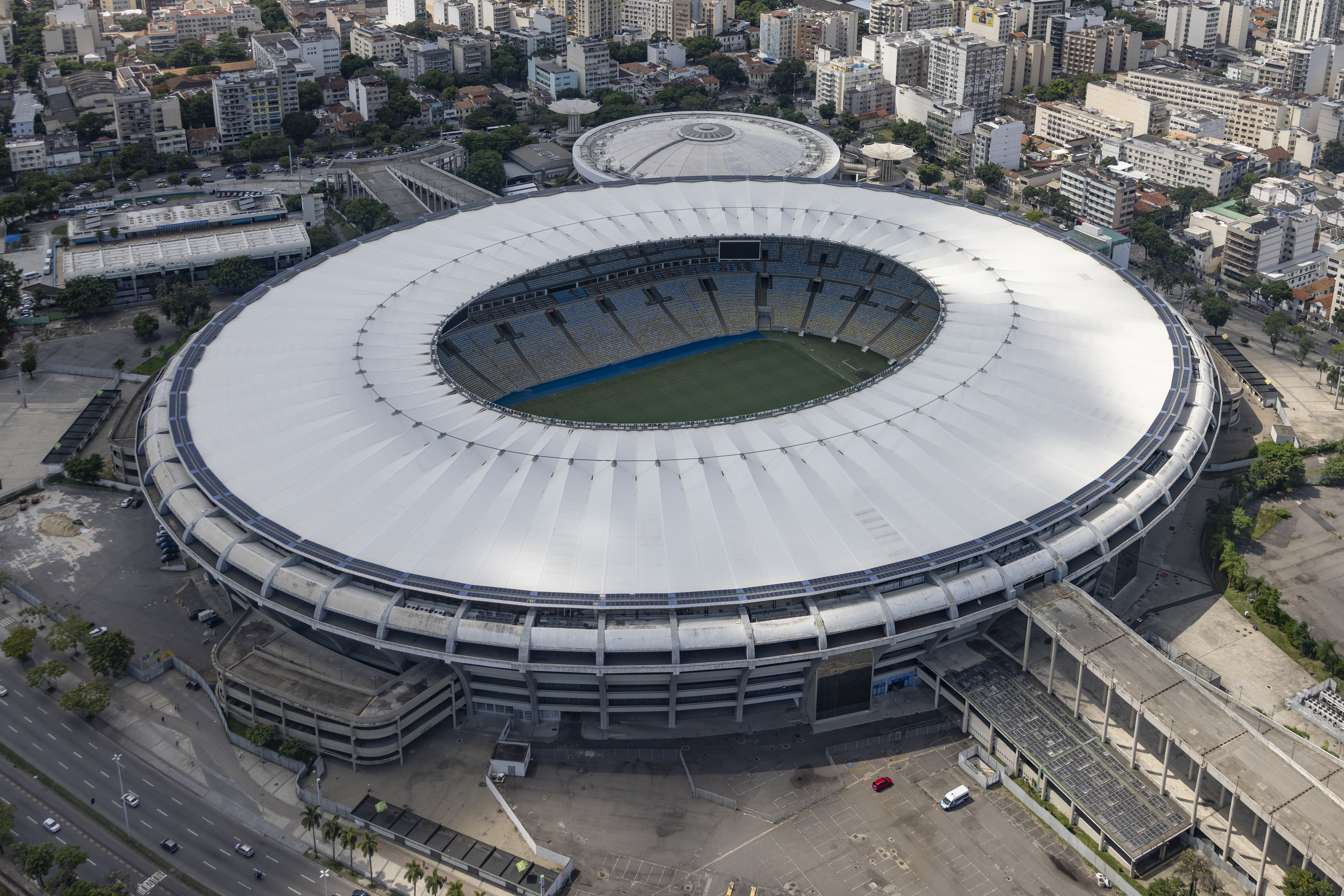
Maracanã Stadium

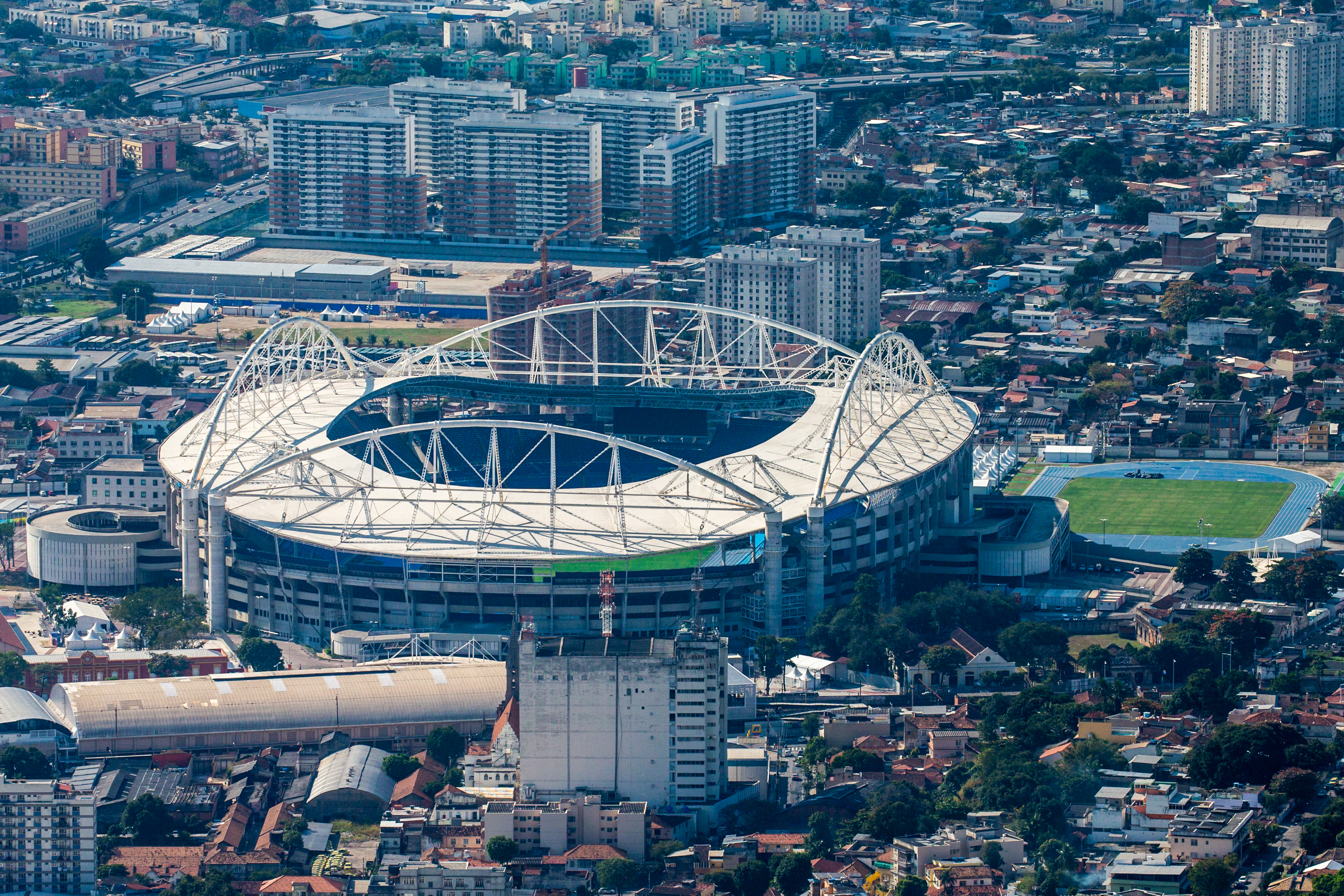
Nilton Santos Olympic Stadium

As in the rest of Brazil, association football is the most popular sport. The city's major teams are Flamengo, Vasco da Gama, Fluminense and Botafogo. Madureira, Bangu, Portuguesa, America and Bonsucesso are small clubs. Players born in the city include Zico, Romário and Ronaldo. Rio de Janeiro was one of the host cities of the 1950 and 2014 FIFA World Cups, for which on both occasions Brazil was the host nation. In 1950, the Maracanã Stadium hosted 8 matches, including all but one of the host team's matches. The Maracanã was also the location of the tournament-deciding match between Uruguay and Brazil, where Brazil only needed a draw to win the final group stage and the whole tournament. Brazil ended up losing 2–1 in front of a home crowd of more than 199,000. In 2014, the Maracanã hosted seven matches, including the final, where Germany beat Argentina 1–0.

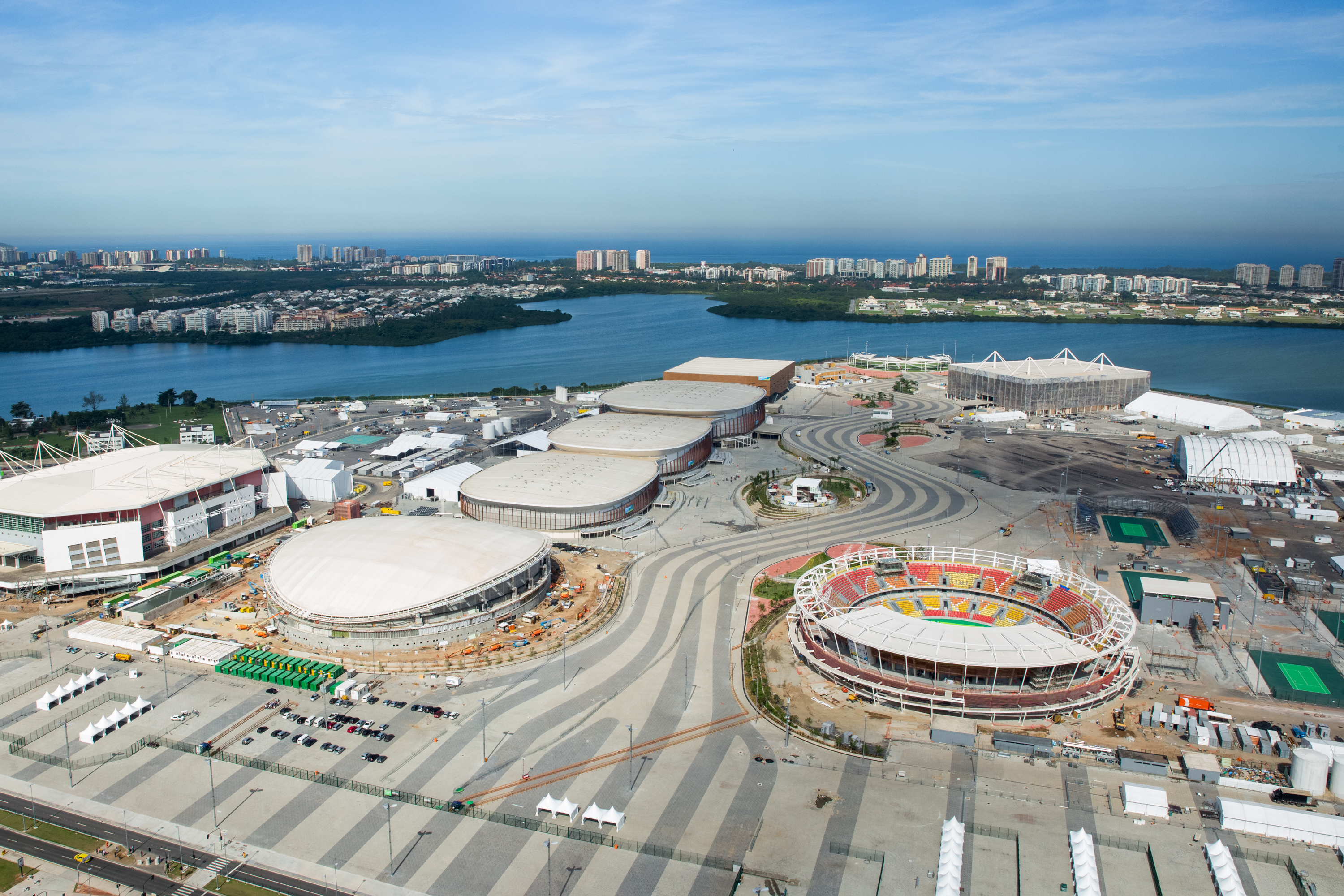
Barra Olympic Park, built for 2016 Summer Olympics

On 2 October 2009, the International Olympic Committee selected Rio de Janeiro to host the 2016 Summer Olympics. Rio made their first bid for the 1936 Summer Olympics, but lost to Berlin. They later made bids for the 2004 and 2012 Games, but failed to become a candidate city both times. Those games were awarded to Athens and London respectively. Rio is the first Brazilian and South American city to host the Summer Olympics. Rio de Janeiro also became the first city in the southern hemisphere outside of Australia to host the games – Melbourne in 1956 and Sydney in 2000. In July 2007, Rio successfully organized and hosted the XV Pan American Games. Rio de Janeiro also hosted the 2011 Military World Games from 15 to 24 July 2011. The 2011 Military World Games were the largest military sports event ever held in Brazil, with approximately 4,900 athletes from 108 countries competing in 20 sports. Rio de Janeiro hosted the 2016 Olympics and Paralympics. The Olympic Games were held from 5 to 21 August 2016. The Paralympics were held from 7 to 18 September 2016.

The city has a history as host of major international sports events. The Ginásio do Maracanãzinho was the host arena for the official FIBA Basketball World Championship for its 1954 and 1963 editions. Later, the Jacarepaguá circuit in Rio de Janeiro was the site for the Formula One Brazilian Grand Prix from 1978 to 1989. Rio de Janeiro also hosted the MotoGP Brazilian Grand Prix from 1995 to 2004 and the Champ Car event from 1996 to 1999. WCT/WQS surfing championships were contested on the beaches from 1985 to 2001. The Rio Champions Cup Tennis tournament is held in the spring. As part of its preparations to host the 2007 Pan American Games, Rio built a new stadium, Estádio Olímpico João Havelange, to hold 45,000 people. It was named after Brazilian ex-FIFA president João Havelange. The city of Rio de Janeiro owns the stadium, but it was rented to Botafogo de Futebol e Regatas for 20 years. Rio de Janeiro has also a multi-purpose arena, the HSBC Arena.

The Brazilian martial art capoeira is very popular. Other popular sports are basketball, beach football, beach volleyball, Beach American Football, footvolley, surfing, kite surfing, hang gliding, motor racing, Brazilian Jiu-Jitsu, Luta Livre, sailing, and competitive rowing. Another sport that is highly popular on the beaches of Rio is called frescobol (pronounced [fɾeʃkoˈbɔw]), a type of beach tennis. Rio de Janeiro is also a popular location for rock climbing, with hundreds of routes all over the city, ranging from easy boulders to technical climbs. Sugarloaf Mountain is an example, with routes from the easy third grade (American 5.4, French 3) to the extremely difficult ninth grade (5.13/8b), up to 280 m (919 ft).

== See also ==
- List of people from Rio de Janeiro
- List of tallest buildings in Rio de Janeiro
- Outline of Rio de Janeiro

== Notes ==
Preceded by Salvador	Capital of Brazil; 1763–1960	Succeeded by Brasília
