= Praça Quinze de Novembro =

Public square in Rio de Janeiro, Brazil

Praça XV de Novembro
- City square
- {{{other_names}}}
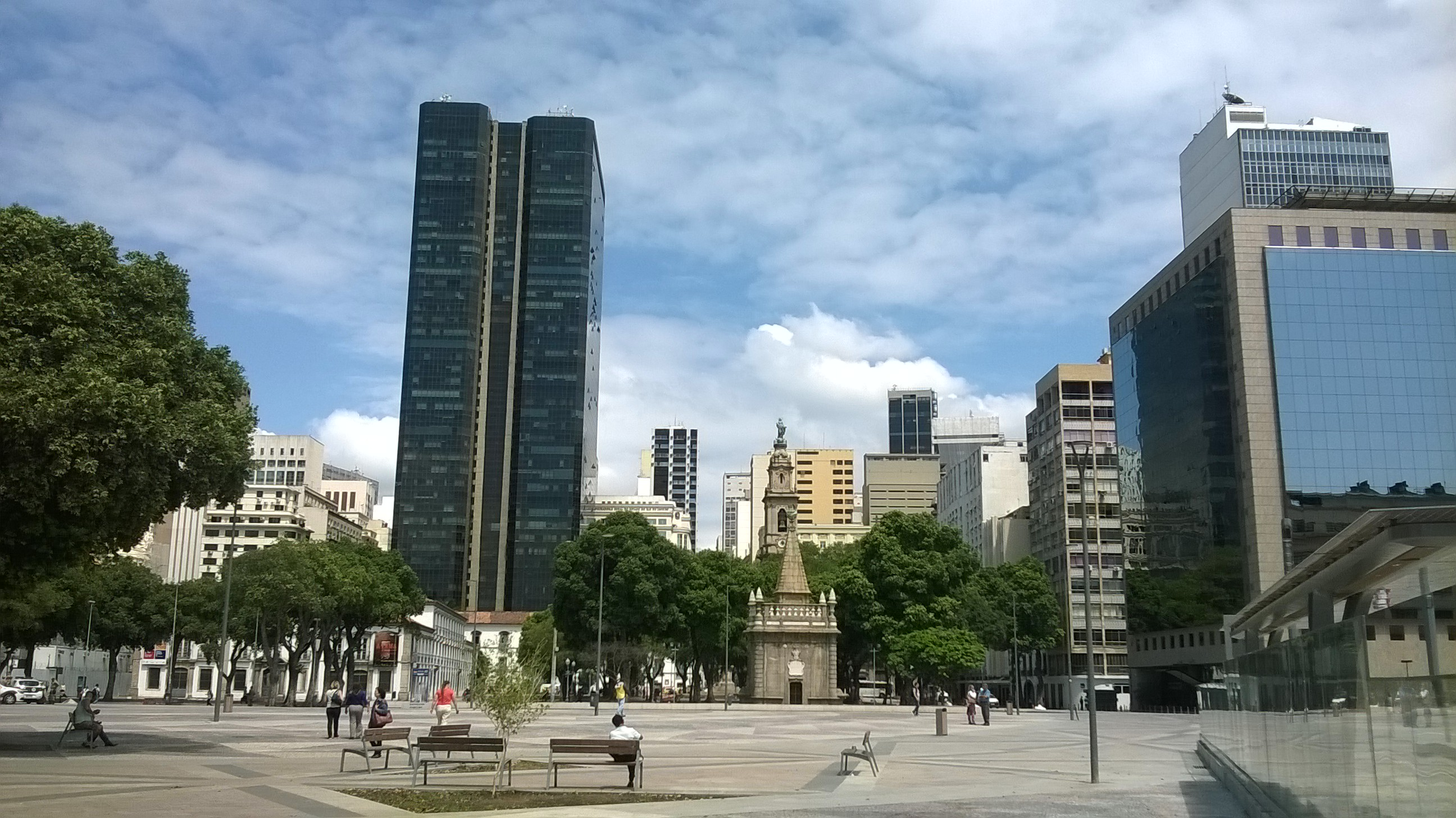
- Dedicated to: Proclamation of the Republic of Brazil, 15 November 1889
- Location: Rio de Janeiro, Brazil
- Location within Rio de Janeiro
- Coordinates: 22.9028°S 43.1729°W

The Praça XV de Novembro, (English: 15 November Square) is a public square in the Centro section of the city of Rio de Janeiro, Brazil. In addition to being located on Rua Primeiro de Março, the square is part of Orla Conde, a public promenade that runs along Guanabara Bay.

== Location ==
The square is located in the historical centre of Rio de Janeiro and is flanked by the Tiradentes Palace, the seat of the Legislative Assembly of Rio de Janeiro; and the Paço Imperial. The Praça XV Station is a ferry terminal servicing a number of destinations in the city of Rio de Janeiro and Niterói.
