= Praça Quinze Station =

Praça XV Station Estação Praça XV
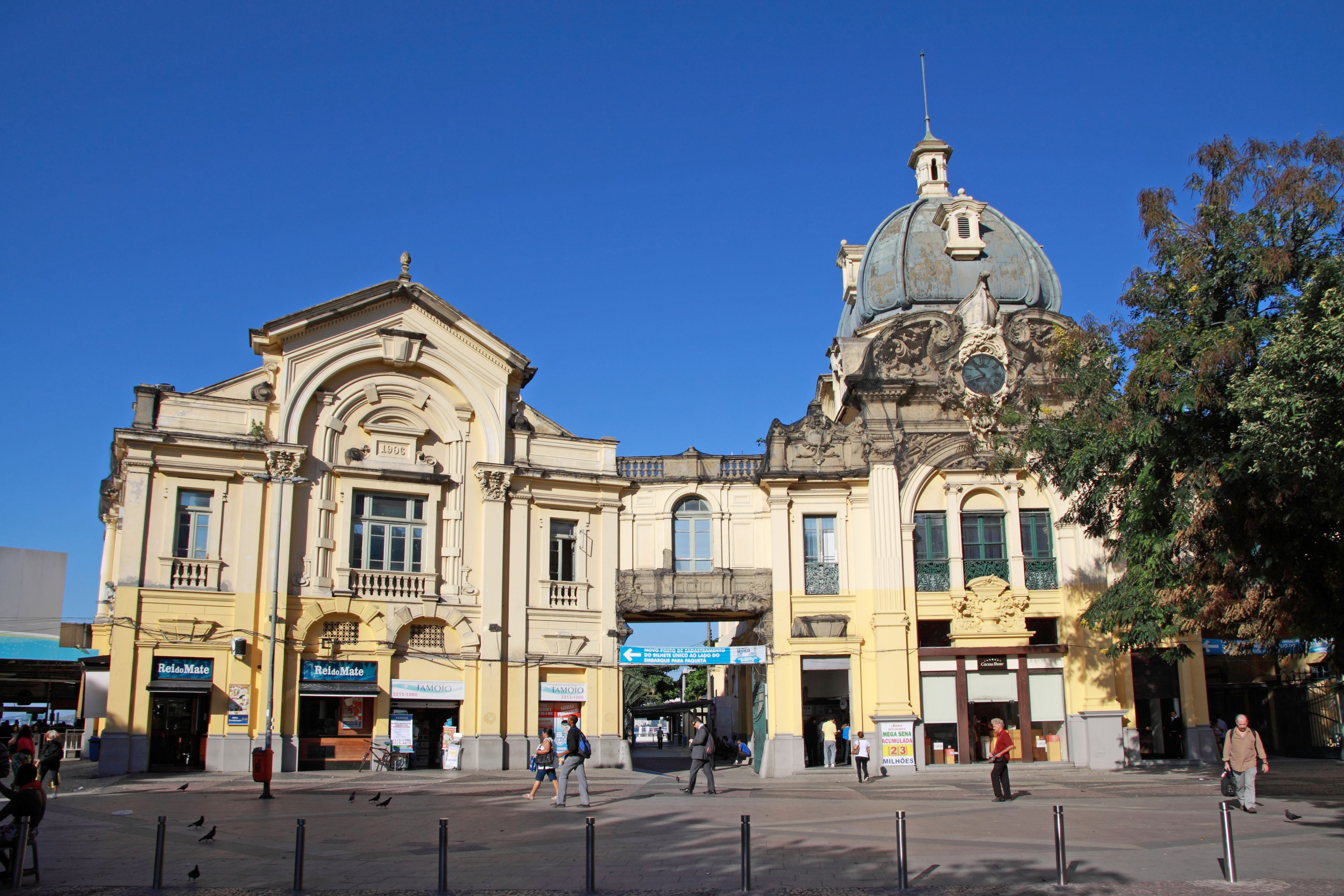
- Praça XV Station building

General information
- Location: Praça 15 de Novembro, 21; Centro, Rio de Janeiro; Brazil
- Coordinates: 22.9027562°S 43.1724094°W
- System: Ferry terminal
- Operator: CCR Barcas
- Bus routes: Niterói; Paquetá; Cocotá; Charitas
Location

Praça XV Station (Portuguese: Estação Praça XV) is a ferry terminal in Rio de Janeiro, Brazil. The terminal is located on the Praça XV de Novembro and is operated by CCR Barcas.

== Destinations ==
Routes serviced by the terminal include Niterói, Paquetá, Cocotá and Charitas.

== Connections ==
Connections can be made to the municipal bus system at the nearby Praça Marechal Âncora after the closure of Misericórdia Bus Terminal in November 2014.

This place is also served by Rio de Janeiro VLT tram.
