= Paço Imperial =

Building in Rio de Janeiro, Brazil

Coordinates: 22°54′12.63″S 43°10′27.24″W

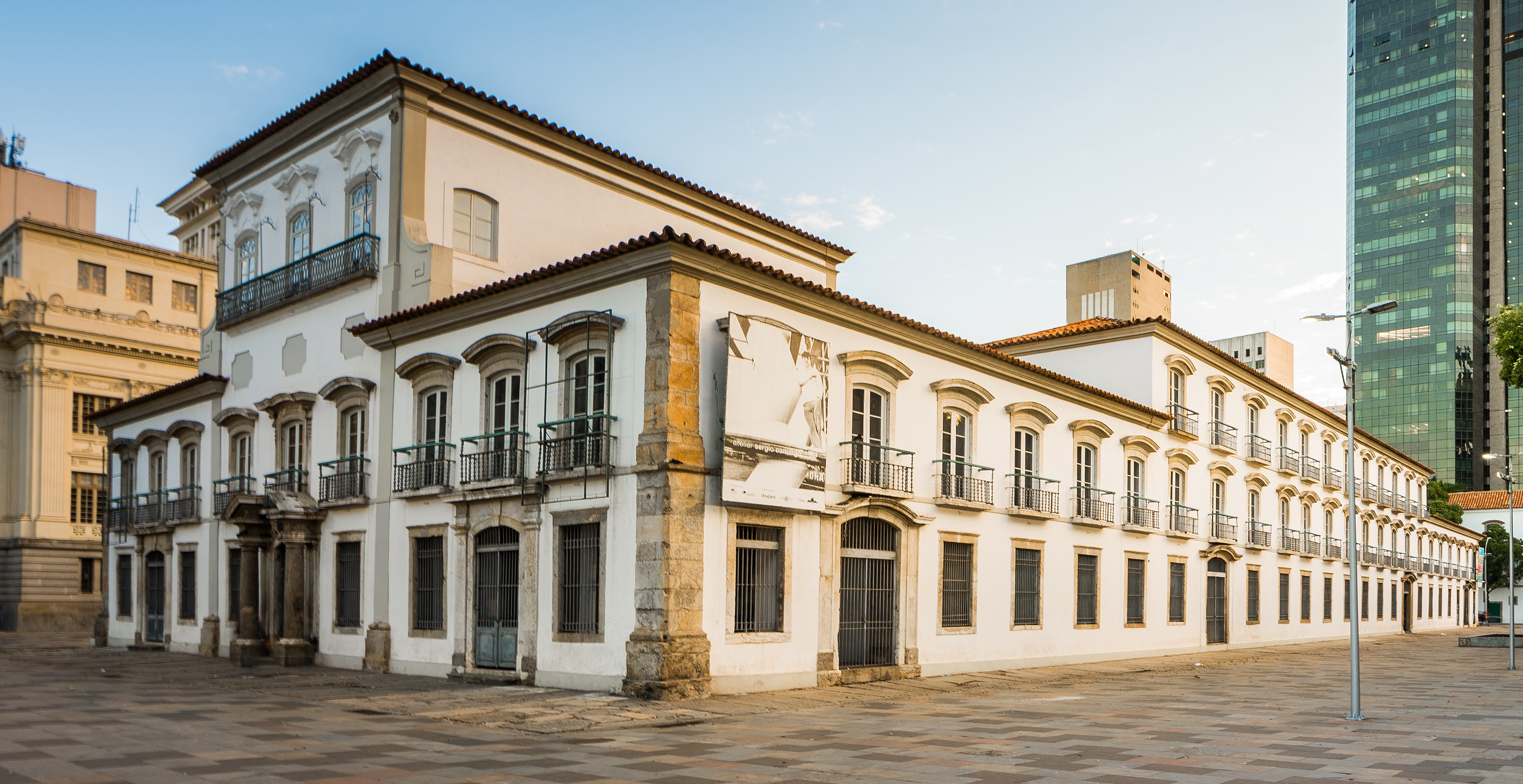
- Main façade of the Paço Imperial
- Interactive map of the Paço Imperial area

General information
- Architectural style: Portuguese Colonial
- Location: Rio de Janeiro, Brazil
- Construction started: 1738

Design and construction
- Architect: José Fernandes Pinto Alpoim

The Paço Imperial (Brazilian Portuguese: [ˈpasu ĩpeɾiˈaw]), or Imperial Palace, previously known as the Royal Palace of Rio de Janeiro and Palace of the Viceroys, is a historic building in the center of the city of Rio de Janeiro, Brazil. The Paço Imperial was built in the 18th century to serve as a residence for the governors of colonial Brazil. From 1808, it was used as a royal residence by King John VI of Portugal as King of Portugal and later also as King of Brazil. In 1822 it became the city palace of the monarchs of the Empire of Brazil, Pedro I and Pedro II, who used it not as a residence, but as a workplace. It was one of the main political centers of Brazil for nearly 150 years, from 1743 to 1889.

The Paço Imperial is located in the Praça XV de Novembro in central Rio. Due to its architectural and historical significance, it is one of Brazil's most important historic buildings. Today it serves as a cultural center.

== History ==
=== Origins ===
The current building was constructed by the order of Gomes Freire de Andrade, governor of the Capitania (colonial administrative region) of Rio de Janeiro. The architect was the Portuguese military engineer José Fernandes Pinto Alpoim, a close collaborator of the governor, who greatly enlarged the existing buildings of the Royal mint and the Royal storage house which existed in the same place. This new Governor’s House (Casa dos Governadores) was finished in 1743 in a plain Baroque style and, except for some details, had the same appearance as the building that exists today. The Palace, very similar to contemporary Portuguese manor houses, has a beautiful Baroque portal made of Portuguese marble, several inner courtyards and a stairway to reach the upper storeys.

The whole area beside the Governors’s House was also remodelled by Pinto Alpoim and turned into a spacious square (known today as Praça XV) including a marble fountain brought from Lisbon. On the opposite side of the square, a large residential building for the Teles de Menezes family was built (a portion of this building still exists).

In 1763, as the seat of the colonial government of Brazil was transferred from Salvador to Rio de Janeiro, the building was turned into the Viceroy’s Palace (Paço dos Vice-Reis), used by the Viceroy of Brazil as administrative center. Around this period, the square beside the Palace gained a stone harborside quay and a new fountain (Fonte de Mestre Valentim) which still exists today.

=== Royal Palace ===
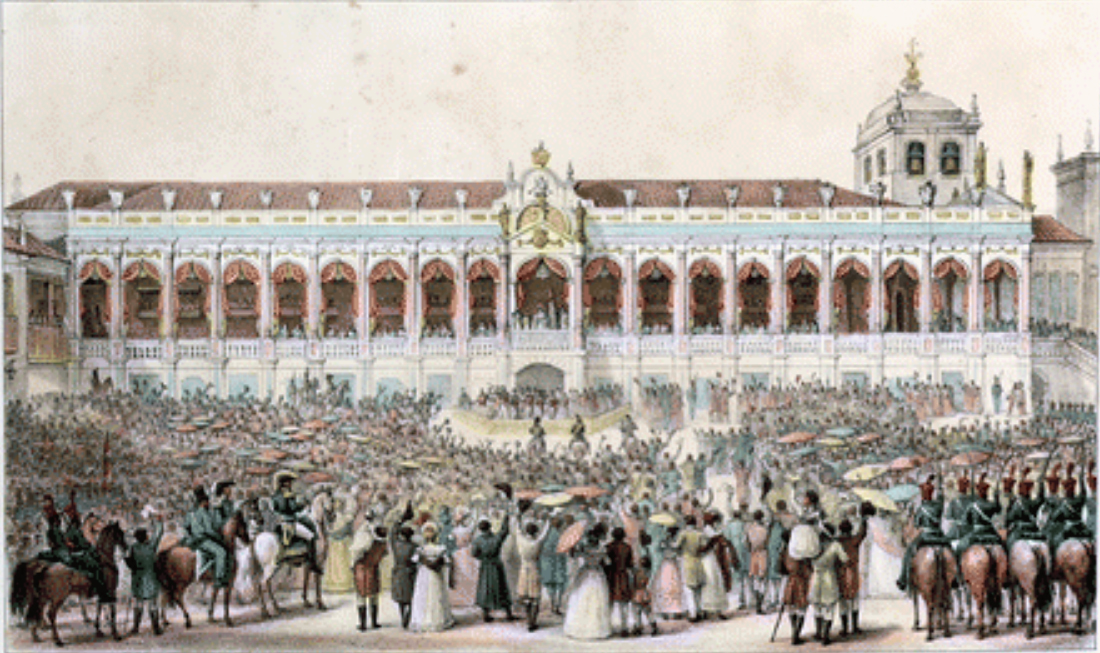
Acclamation of King John VI of Portugal on February 6, 1818

The Palace became a Royal Palace (Paço Real) in 1808, when the court of prince regent John of Braganza arrived in Rio, escaping the invasion of Portugal by Napoleon. Here the Prince Regent (later King John VI) ruled the newly named United Kingdom of Portugal, Brazil and the Algarves. Around this time, a third floor was added to the central portion of the façade of the Palace which faced the sea. At the back of the Palace, an elevated passageway was built to link the Palace with the Carmelite Convent, where Queen Mary I of Portugal was housed. A throne room was arranged on the second floor of the Palace, and there the traditional ceremony of beija-mão (hand-kissing) took place.

=== Imperial Palace ===
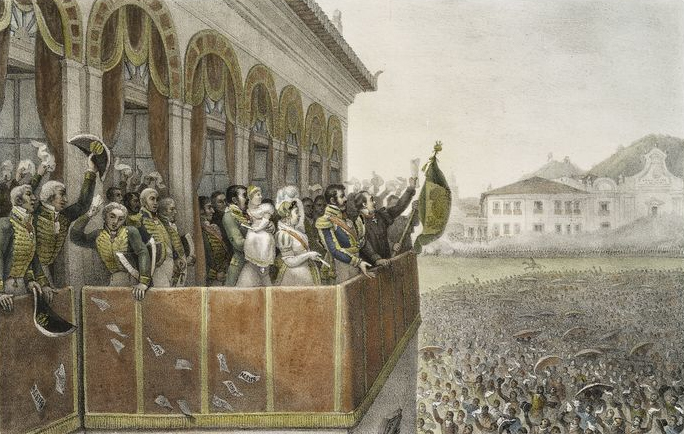
Prince Regent Pedro of Braganza greets people from a balcony at the palace

In 1822, Brazil became an independent nation as the Empire of Brazil. The Palace continued as an administrative center under Emperor Pedro I and his successor Pedro II. At this time it was renamed the Imperial Palace (Paço Imperial). The Emperors resided at the São Cristóvão Palace (Palace of St. Christopher), but the Imperial Palace remained the formal seat of the Court and the monarch's workplace.

Several important events in the History of Brazil are associated with the Paço Imperial. On 9 January 1822, Pedro I announced from one of the balconies of the Palace facing the square that he would refuse Portuguese orders and remain on in an independent Brazil (the so-called Dia do Fico). During 1888 in one of the Palace chambers, Pedro II's daughter Princess Isabel, acting as regent, signed the famous Lei Áurea, which definitively banned slavery from Brazil. In addition, the Palace and its adjacent square and chapel were the scene for the coronations of John VI, Pedro I and Pedro II and other public celebrations.

=== Decay and restoration ===
With the establishment of the Republic of Brazil in 1889, the Paço Imperial lost its former importance and was converted into the central Mail Office for Rio de Janeiro. The interior decorations of the rooms were dispersed, and the façades were modified. In 1980 a major restoration returned the building to the appearance it had around 1818. This task was made easier as an enormous number of images from the 18th and 19th centuries depict the Palace in detail.

Since 1984 the Paço Imperial has been an important cultural center, hosting temporary art exhibitions of painting, sculpture, cinema, music, etc. It also houses the Paulo Santos Library, specializing in art, architecture and engineering, and also containing several rare books from the 16th to the 18th centuries.

== Gallery ==
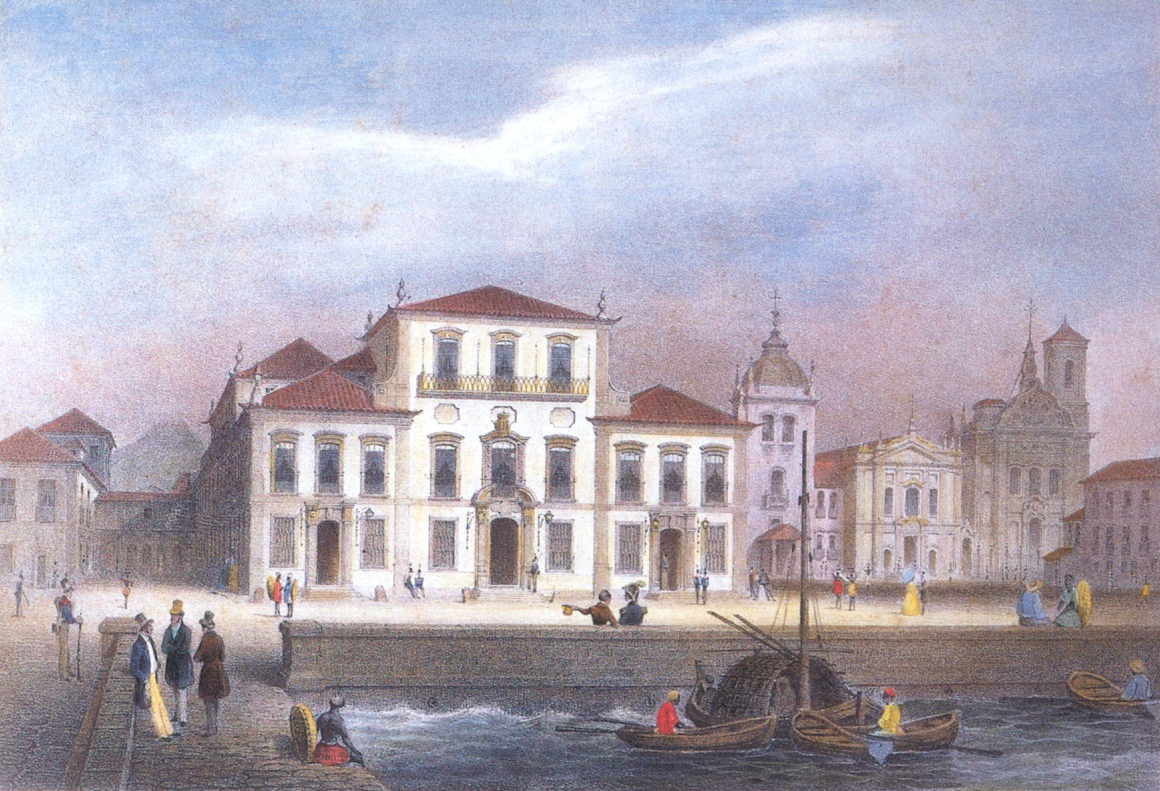
The Paço Imperial in 1818

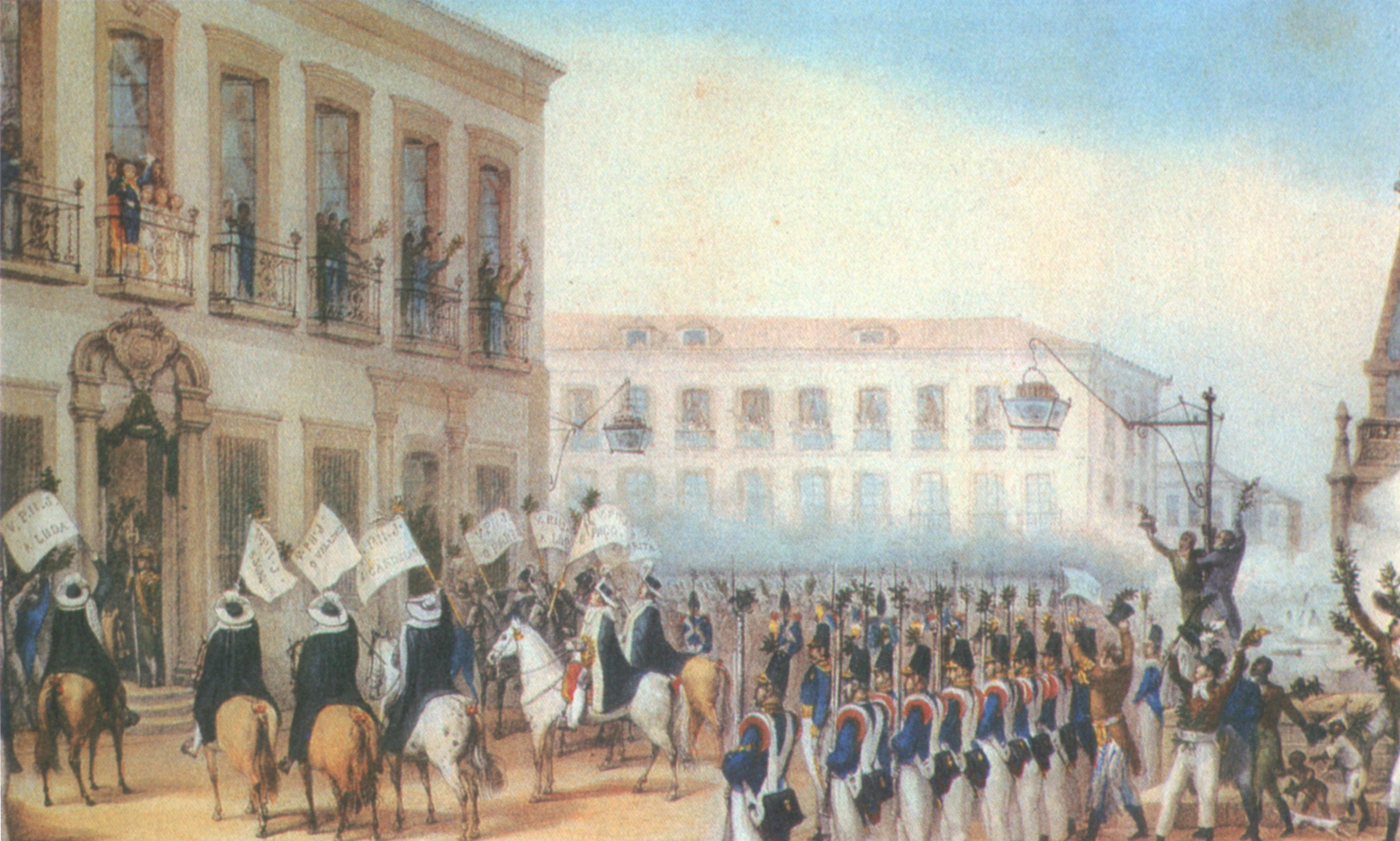
Acclamation of Pedro II, 1831

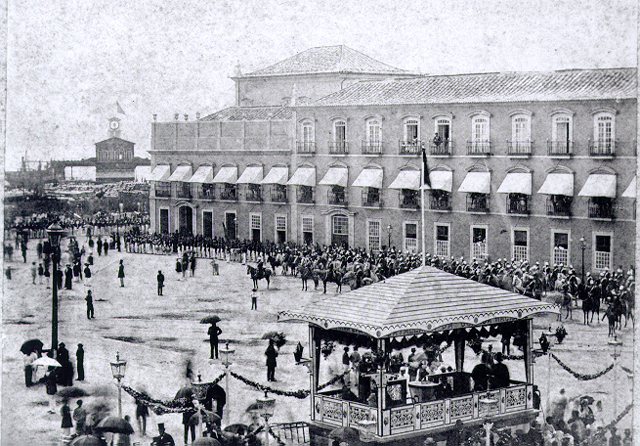
The palace being prepared for the wedding ceremony of Isabel, Princess Imperial and Prince Gaston of Orléans, 1864

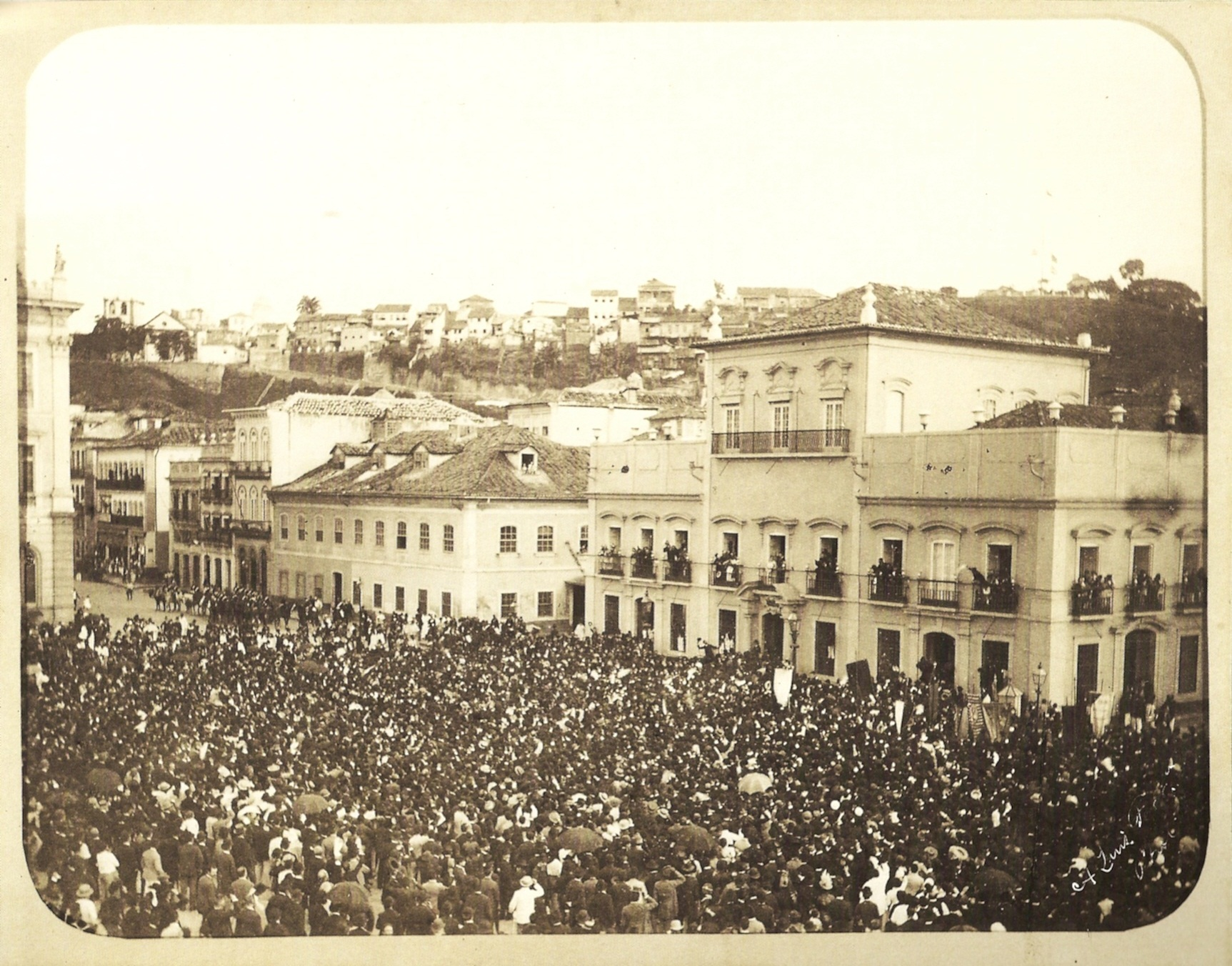
Princess Isabel is cheered from the central balcony by a crowd in the streets, moments after having signed the Golden Law, 1888

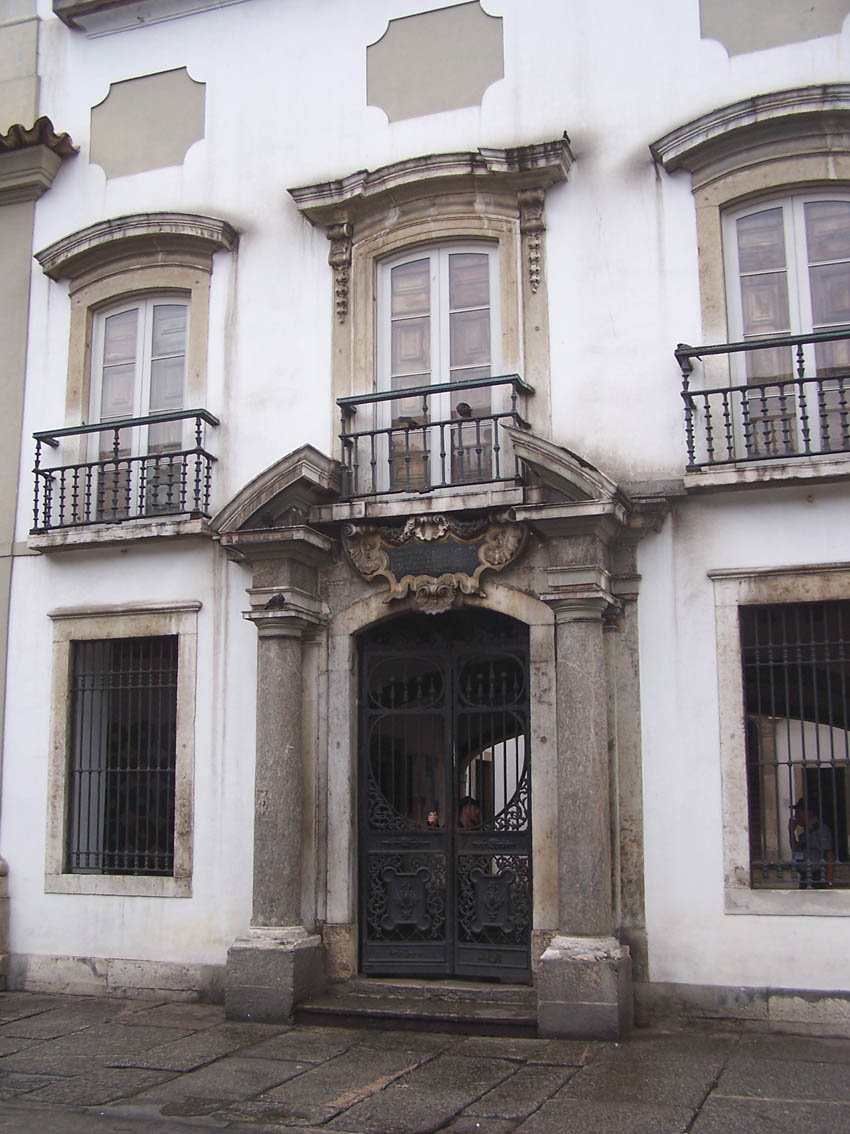
Main portal of the Paço Imperial

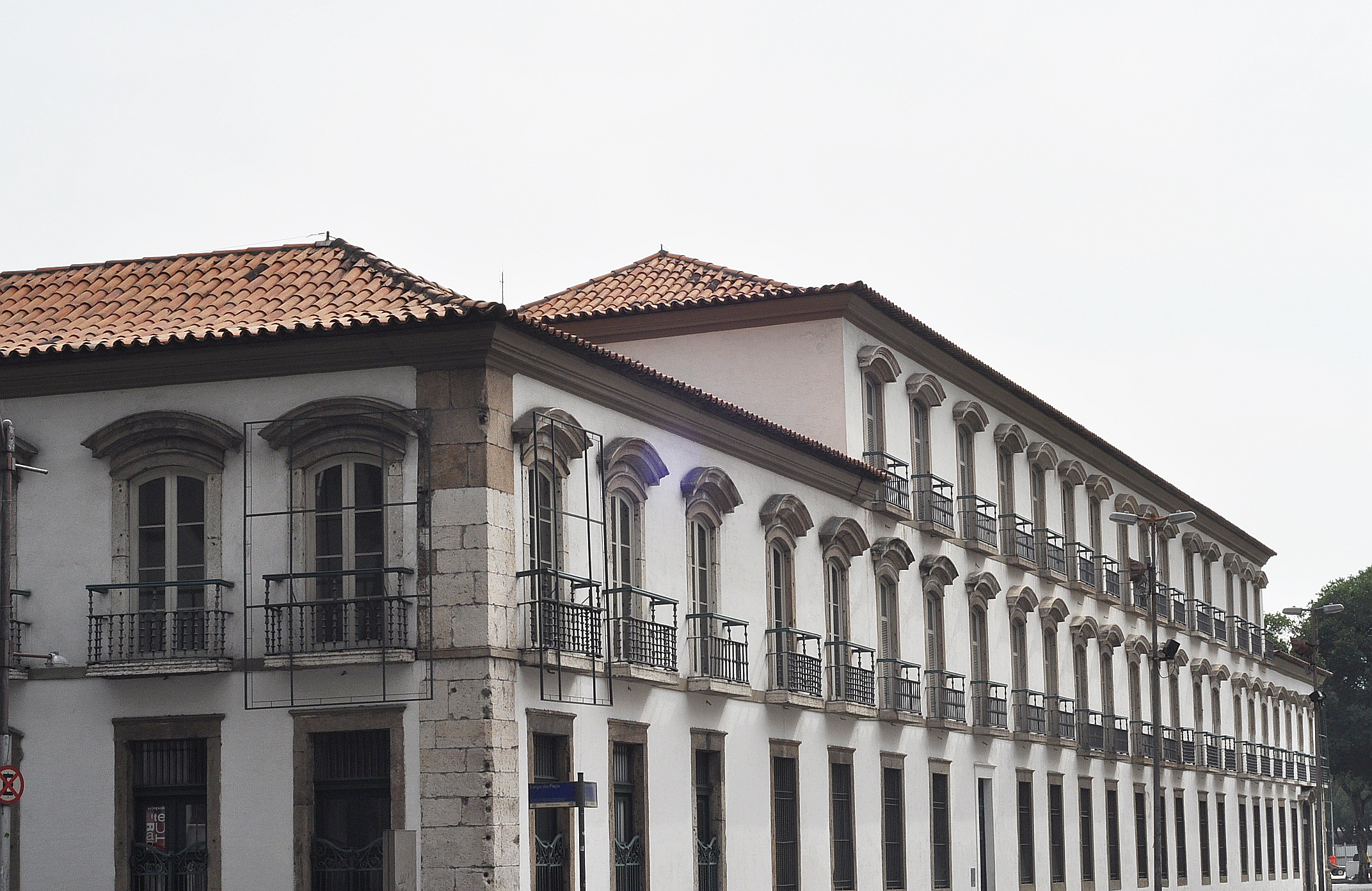
Side view

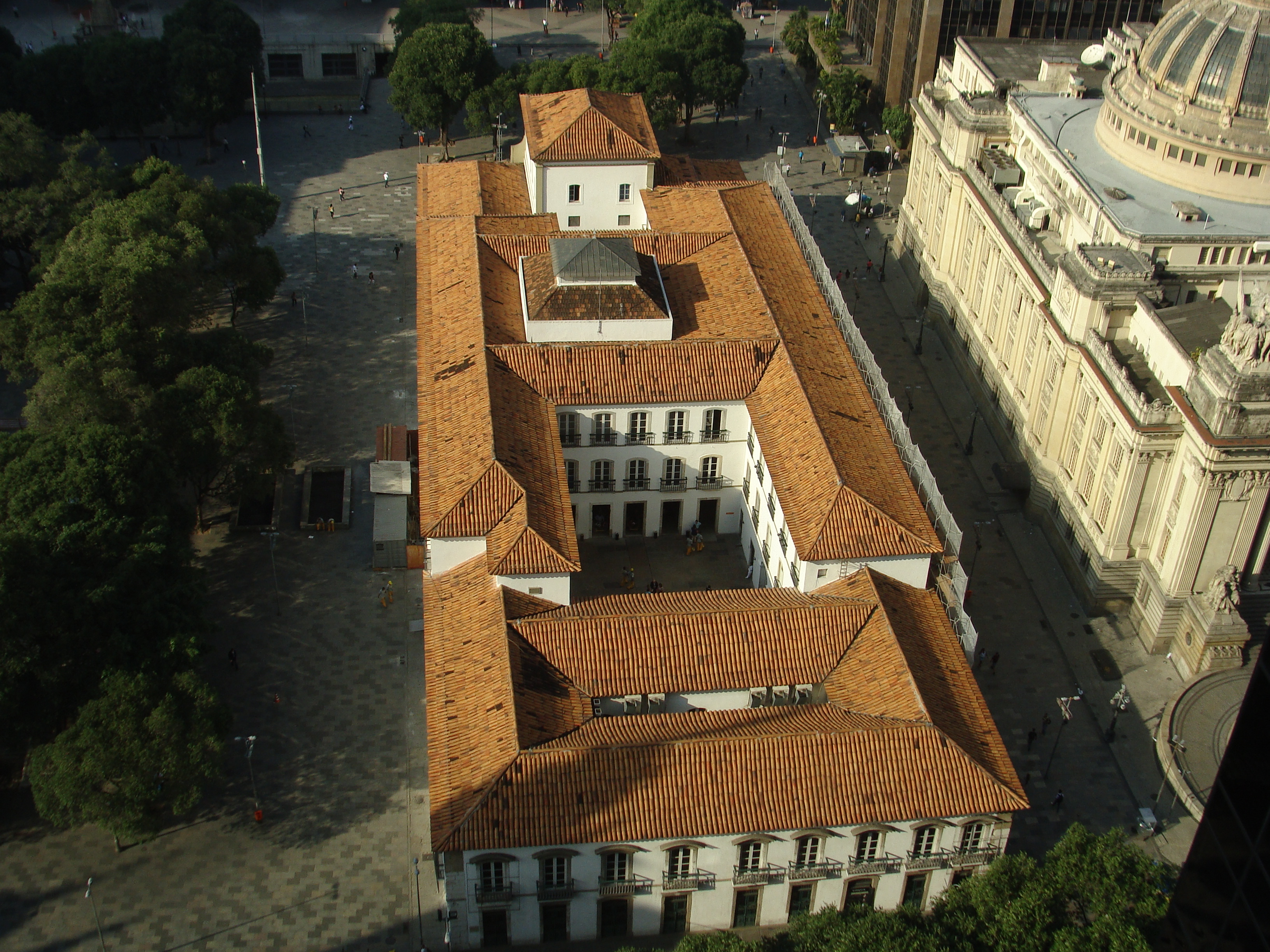
The Imperial Palace as seen from the Candido Mendes building, with the Tiradentes Palace to the right

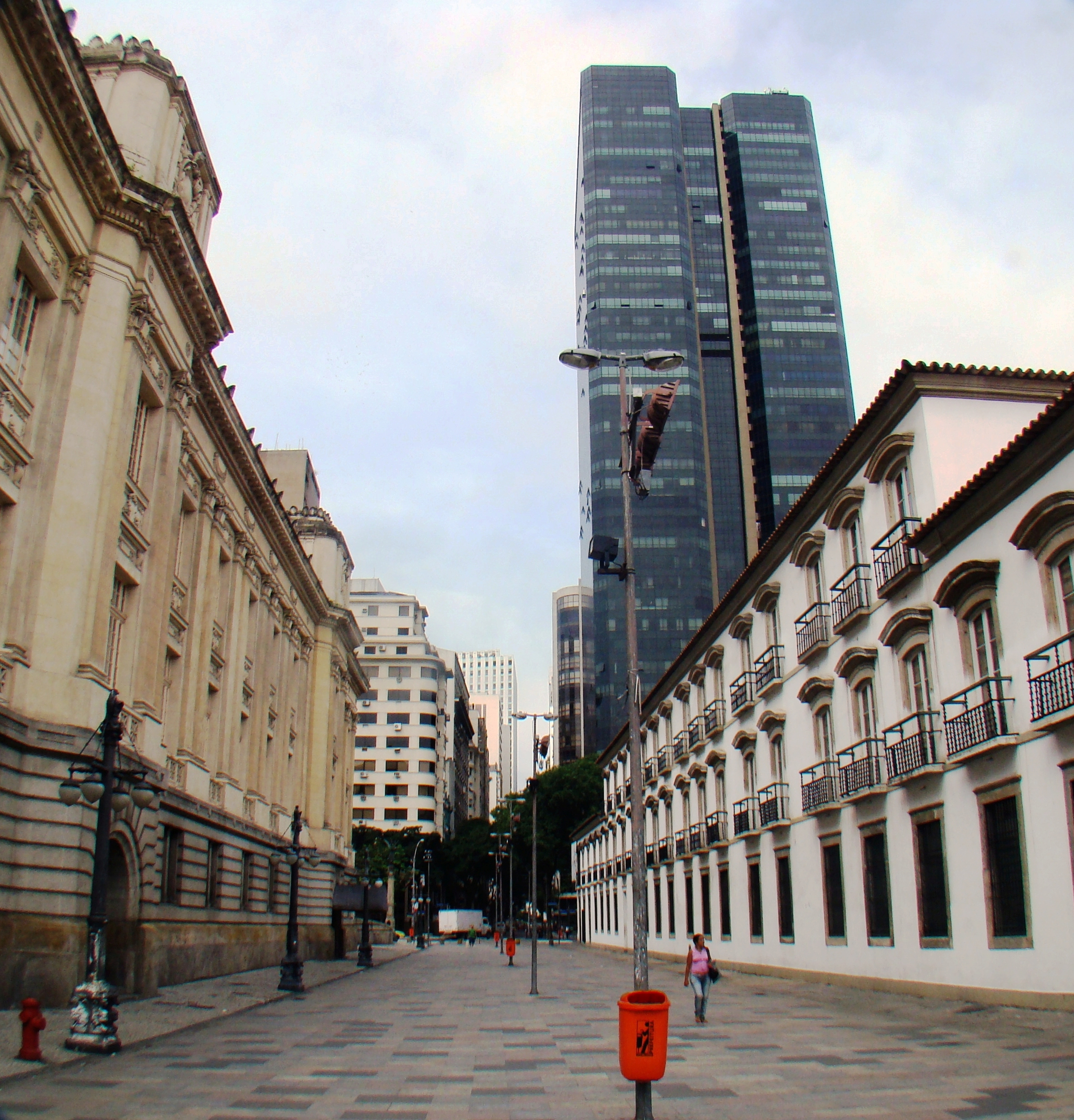
Seen from Assembléia Street

== See also ==
- Paço de São Cristóvão, the imperial palace – residence of the Emperors of Brazil
- Baroque architecture
