= Archimedes Memória =

Brazilian architect

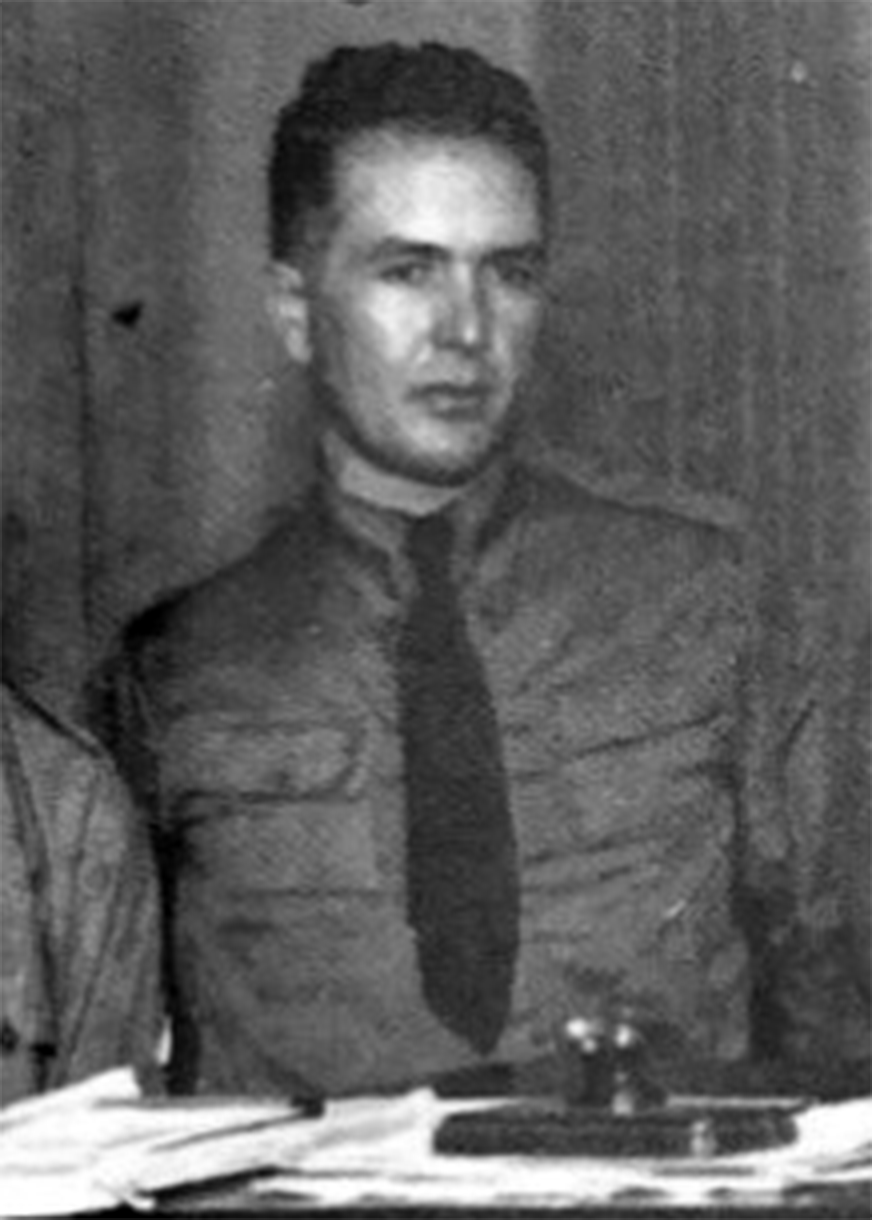
Archimedes Memória

Archimedes Memória (March 7, 1893 – September 20, 1960) was a Brazilian architect and professor. His best known project is the Tiradentes Palace, the former seat of the Chamber of Deputies, which he designed together with Francisque Couchet.

In 1935, he won a public competition to design the Gustavo Capanema Palace, with a project blending Classical and Art Deco styles with native Marajoara elements. However, the project was rejected by the Ministry of Education, which then commissioned Lúcio Costa, one of Memória's former students, to design the building, which would become a landmark of modernist architecture in Brazil. After this episode, he gradually withdrew from participation in major commissions, dedicating his final decades to professorship.

== Biography ==
Born in Ipu on a small farm, he moved to Fortaleza as a child to study at the traditional Liceu do Ceará, where he befriended Gustavo Barroso. His talent for drawing was noticed by his father, and he developed it throughout his school years. He then moved to Rio de Janeiro in 1911 to enroll in the course of drawing at the Escola Nacional de Belas Artes, later switching to the architecture program, from which he graduated in 1917. The following year, he began his professional career at the architectural office of Heitor de Mello, who became his master. In 1920, Memória was appointed professor at his alma mater, where he taught architectural composition. In 1931, he became director of the National Faculty of Architecture of the University of Brazil.

From the early 1920s to the mid 1930s, he worked on large public commissions, including the urban planning for the International Exhibition of the Centenary of Independence, the design of the Hipódromo da Gávea, the clubhouse of Botafogo, the National Historical Museum, the urban plan of his hometown of Ipu, and the high altar of the Candelária Church. He also architected private houses.

In the 1930s, he joined the Brazilian Integralist Action, for which he ran for federal deputy in 1935. Memória inaugurated a course at artistic culture for the movement's activists, offering classes on ''music, dance, literature, painting, sculpture, and theater''.
