= Tiradentes Palace =

- Palácio Tiradentes
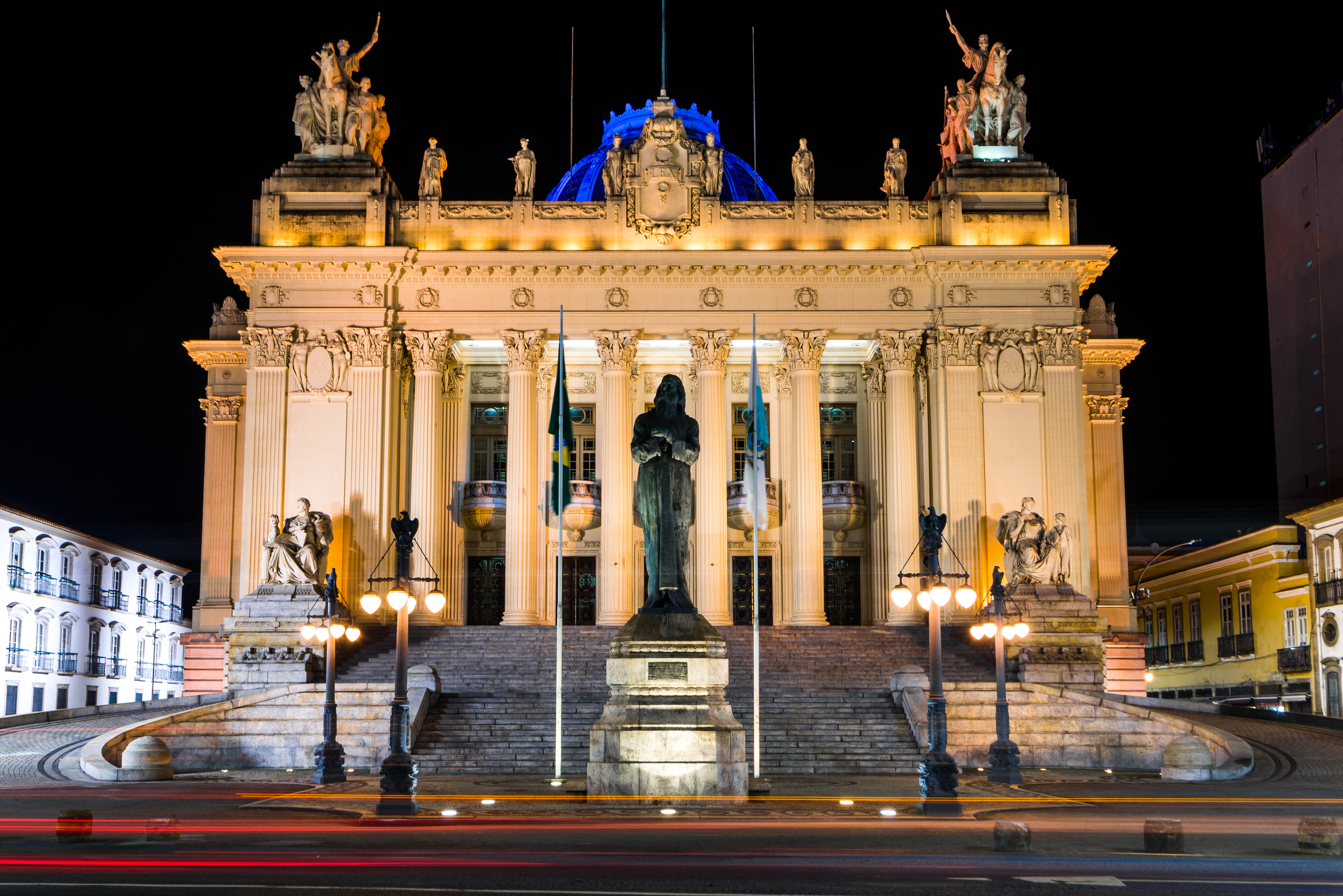

- Location within Rio de Janeiro

General information
- Status: Seat of the Legislative Assembly of Rio de Janeiro
- Architectural style: Eclecticism
- Location: Rio de Janeiro, Rua Primeiro de Março s/n, Brazil
- Coordinates: 22°54′13.932317″S 43°10′25.957203″W
- Construction started: 1922
- Inaugurated: 6 May 1926
- Owner: Rio de Janeiro state government

Design and construction
- Architects: Archimedes Memoria; Francisque Couchet

Website
- palaciotiradentes.rj.gov.br

The Tiradentes Palace (Portuguese: Palácio Tiradentes) is an eclectic government building located in the Centro neighborhood (bairro), next to the Paço Imperial in Rio de Janeiro, Brazil. It was inaugurated on 6 May 1926 and was the former seat of the Chamber of Deputies of Brazil, between 1926 and 1960, and is the current seat of the Legislative Assembly of the State of Rio de Janeiro.

== History ==
=== First building ===
The Tiradentes Palace replaced another building that once occupied the same spot. The construction of the first building, called Casa de Câmara e Cadeia (literally: House of Chamber and Jail), was requested by the local government of Rio de Janeiro in 1631. It was built in 1640 and housed the three aldermans of Rio de Janeiro and a jail. They were elected by indirect vote, for a one year term, and took care of the city's finances. The aldermans worked on the upper floor while the jail functioned on the lower one. As time passed the building became known as Cadeia Velha (Old Jail). It was in this jail that one of the leading figures of the Minas Gerais Conspiracy, Joaquim José da Silva Xavier, known as Tiradentes, was imprisoned. Tiradentes was imprisoned there for three years, until his execution by hanging on 21 April 1792.

The upper floor served as the seat of the Chamber of Deputies and later the Senate, until 1808, when it was then used to house the Portuguese royal family's servants after the transfer of the Portuguese court to Brazil. At the time of Brazil's Independence in 1822, Rio de Janeiro was the country's capital and the building became the seat of the General Constituent Assembly, tasked with creating Brazil's first constitution, in 1823.

It later became the seat of the General Assembly of the Empire of Brazil, the lower house of the country's legislative branch (the Senate being the upper one). From 1825 onwards, the street to the right of the building, then known as Rua da Cadeia, became known as Rua da Assembleia, a name it retains to this day. It was in that building, at that time serving as the General Assembly, that the Golden Law that abolished slavery in Brazil was voted and approved in 1888.

After the proclamation of the republic, in 1889, the building became the seat of the Chamber of Deputies until 1914, at which point it already had serious structural problems due to its old age; the Chamber of Deputies was then transferred to the Monroe Palace.

=== The palace ===
On 6 December 1921 then president Epitácio Pessoa authorized the construction of a new seat for the Chamber of Deputies via Decree No. 4,381-A; the construction had been requested by the president of the Chamber, Arnolfo Azevedo. On 25 December 1921 a project was approved which provided for the construction of the new building. The old imperial building was demolished in 1922, giving way to the Tiradentes Palace, a monumental building designed in the eclectic style by Archimedes Memoria and Francisque Couchet; its inauguration took place on 6 May 1926, the same date in which the first Legislative Chamber of the Empire of Brazil was established a hundred years earlier. The total cost was around 14 million réis. Other Brazilian states helped in its construction by donating money and materials. It was named in honor of Tiradentes, who was hanged for conspiring against the Portuguese crown; the conspirators wanted to establish a republic in Minas Gerais in 1789.

With the establishment of the Estado Novo in 1937, Getúlio Vargas closed the Congress and the Tiradentes Palace became the headquarters of the Department of Press and Propaganda, which was responsible for censorship during the Vargas regime. With the end of the Estado Novo, in 1945, the palace returned to house the Chamber of Deputies until 20 April 1960.

In 1960, with the move of the federal capital to Brasília during the government of Juscelino Kubitschek, the city of Rio de Janeiro ceased to be the Federal District, becoming the state of Guanabara and the Tiradentes Palace began to house the Legislative Assembly of the State of Guanabara. The state of Guanabara existed between 1960 and 1975, when it merged with the state of Rio de Janeiro and the Tiradentes Palace began to house the Legislative Assembly of the State of Rio de Janeiro, a function it holds to this day.

All presidents of Brazil between 1926 and 1960 took office at the Tiradentes Palace: from Washington Luís (the first one to do so) to Juscelino Kubitschek.

== Style ==
Construction of the Tiradentes Palace took place during the celebrations of the centenary of the independence of Brazil. An International Exposition was held to celebrate the event from 7 September 1922 to 23 March 1923. In this context the palace's style and motives, including internal decoration elements such as the paintings, reflect the republican government's goal of consolidating the image and aesthetics of a Brazilian national past, with several references to historical events in Brazil. The paintings on the dome reflect this idea and present Brazil's history with the idea of a natural evolution: beginning with European discovery and finishing in the Republic.

The dome is divided into eight panels, four large and four minor ones; the larger panels depict the evangelization of the indigenous peoples; governor-general Tomé de Sousa; the Empire of Brazil era represented by figures such as José Bonifácio, Diogo Antônio Feijó and the Emperor Pedro II; and finally the Republic, represented by presidents Deodoro da Fonseca, Floriano Peixoto and Prudente de Morais. The four minor panels depict the landing of Portuguese navigator Pedro Álvares Cabral in Brazil; the expulsion of the Dutch colonists from Pernambuco; the bandeirantes; and finally the Baron of Rio Branco, responsible for Brazil's acquisition of some of its disputed territories, such as Acre in 1903. The building's dominant style is the eclecticism, with classical and renaissance features. In front of the building lies a large statue of Tiradentes, made by sculptor Francisco de Andrade, mirroring the representation that was made by painter Décio Villares, who intentionally portrayed Tiradentes as a Christian martyr-like figure.

== Gallery ==
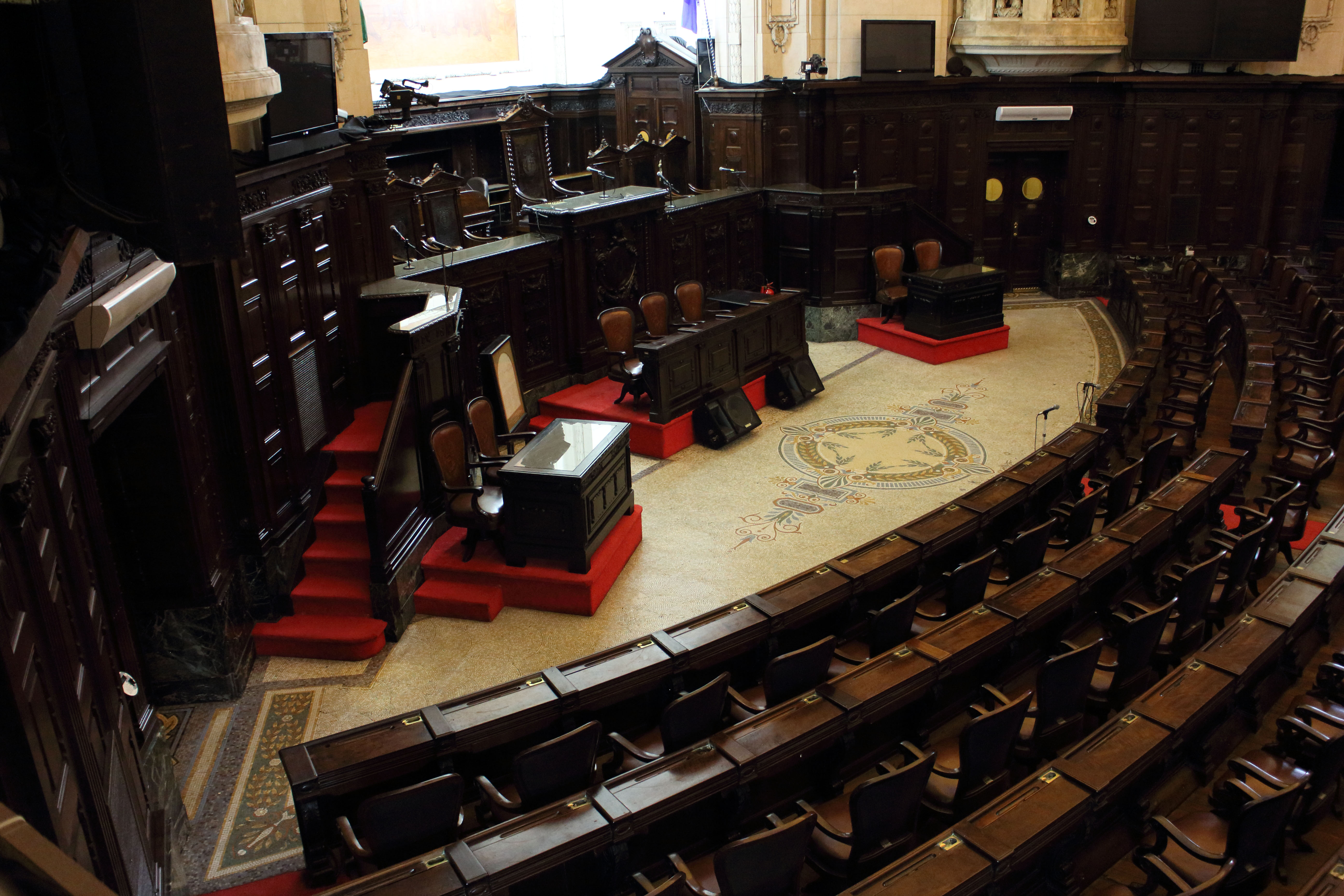
Interior

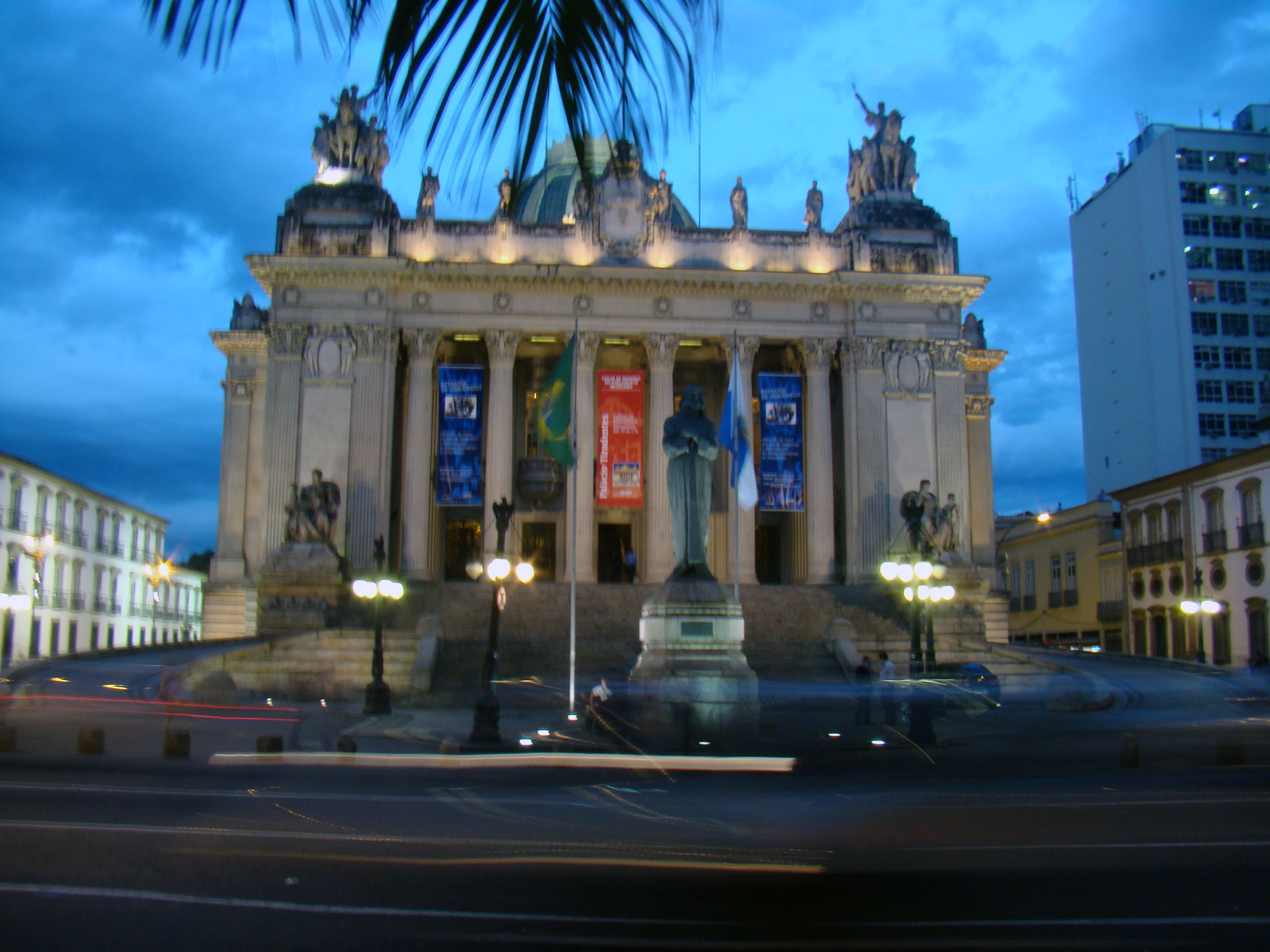
Façade

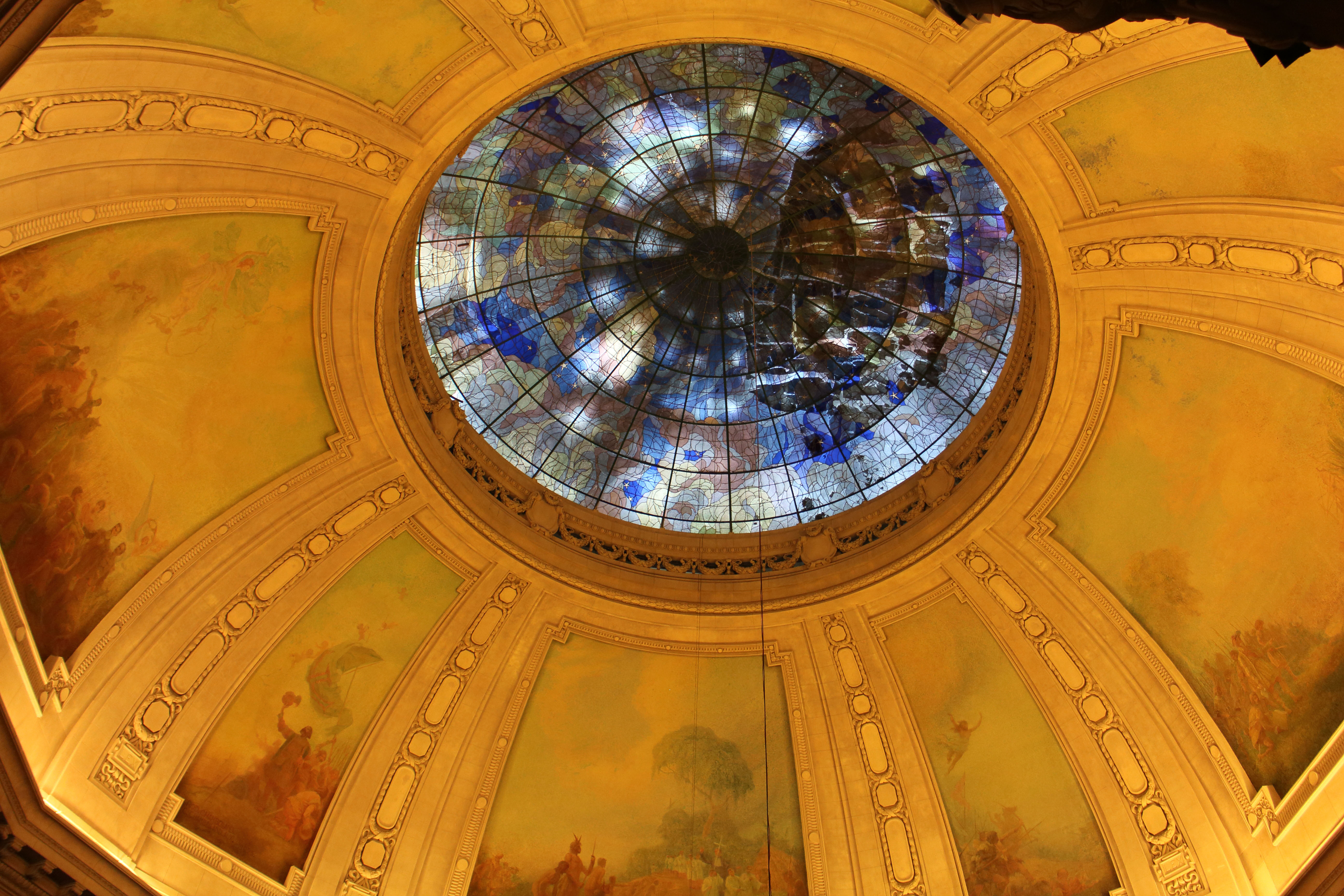
Dome

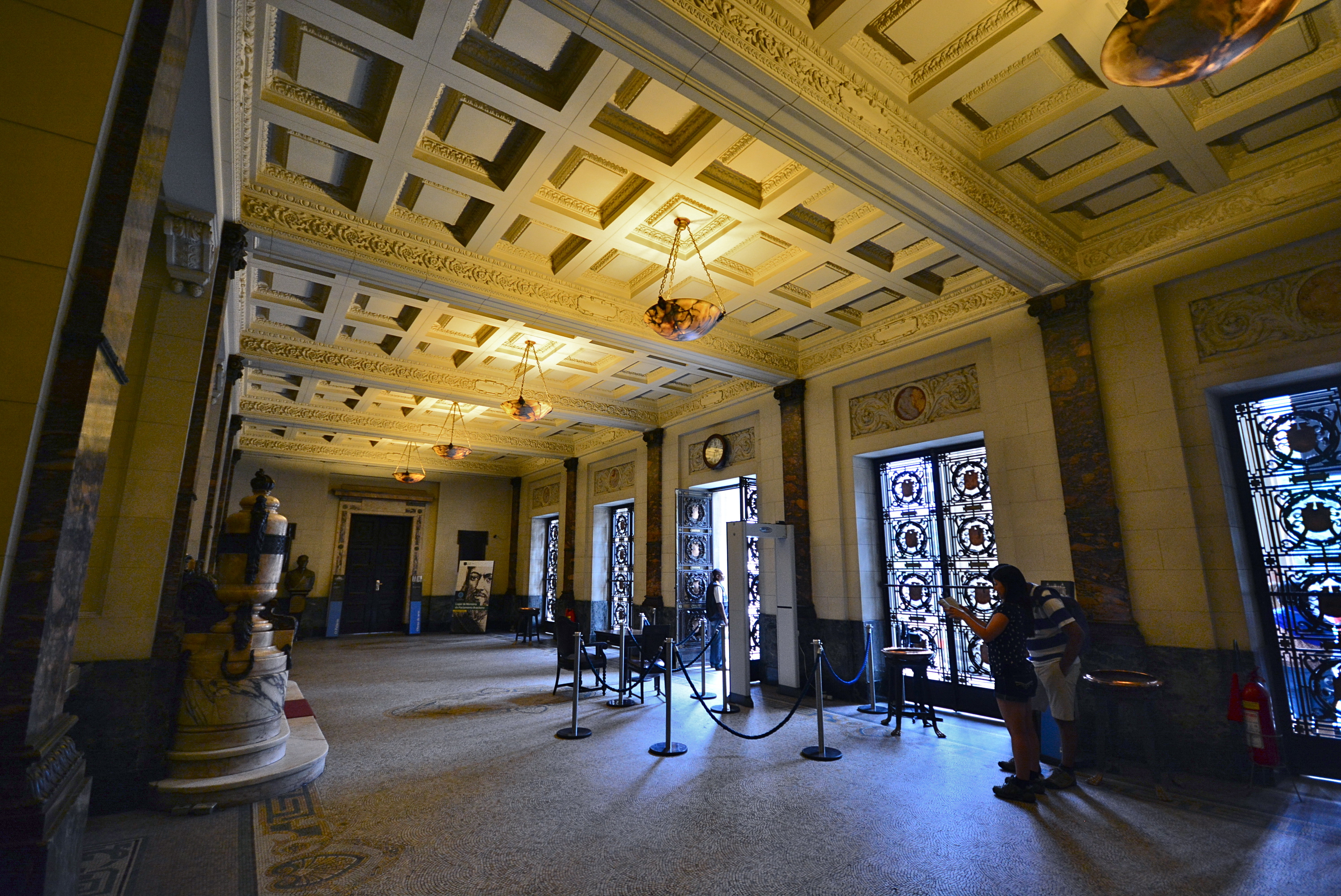
Interior

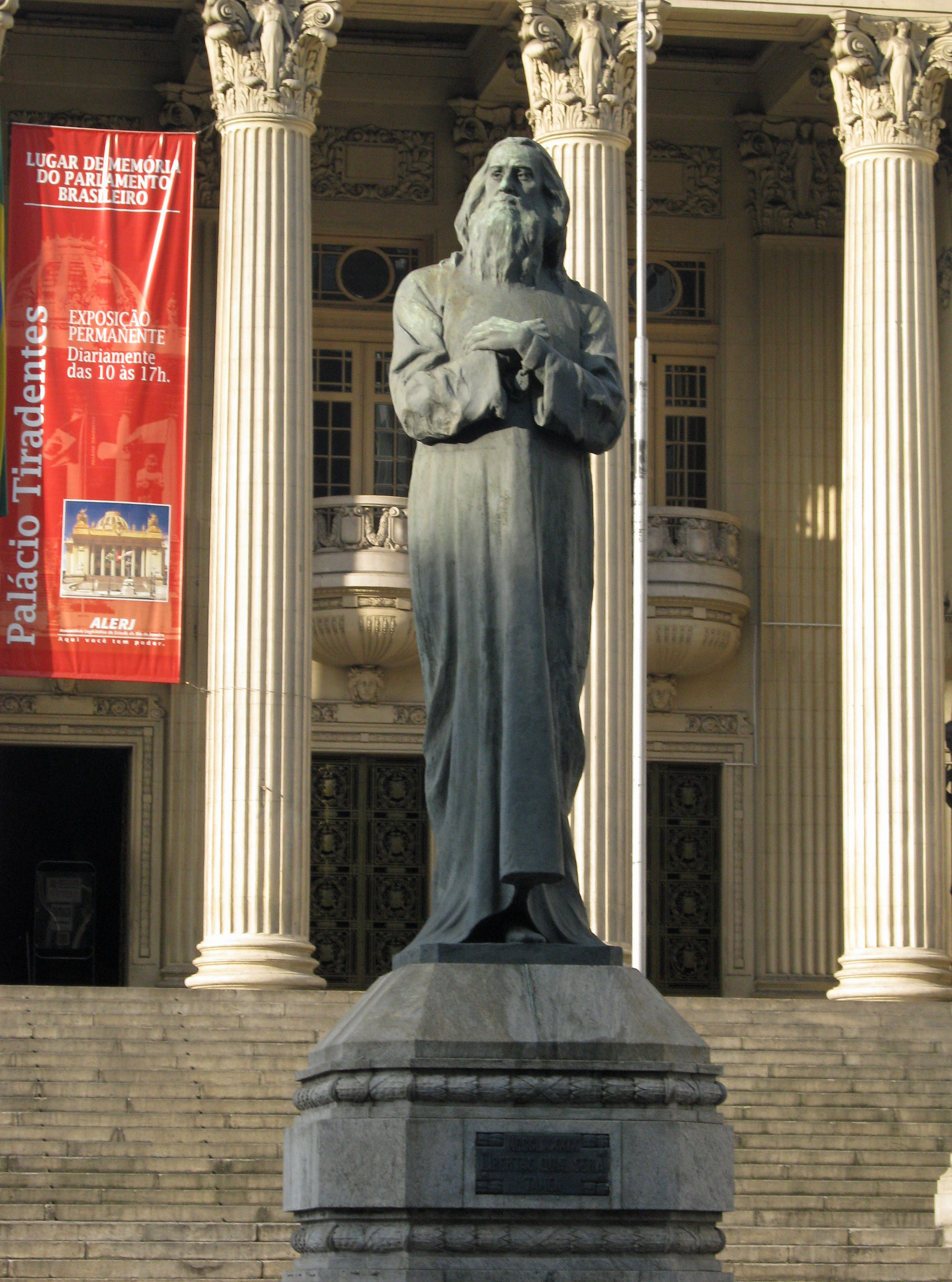
Tiradentes statue

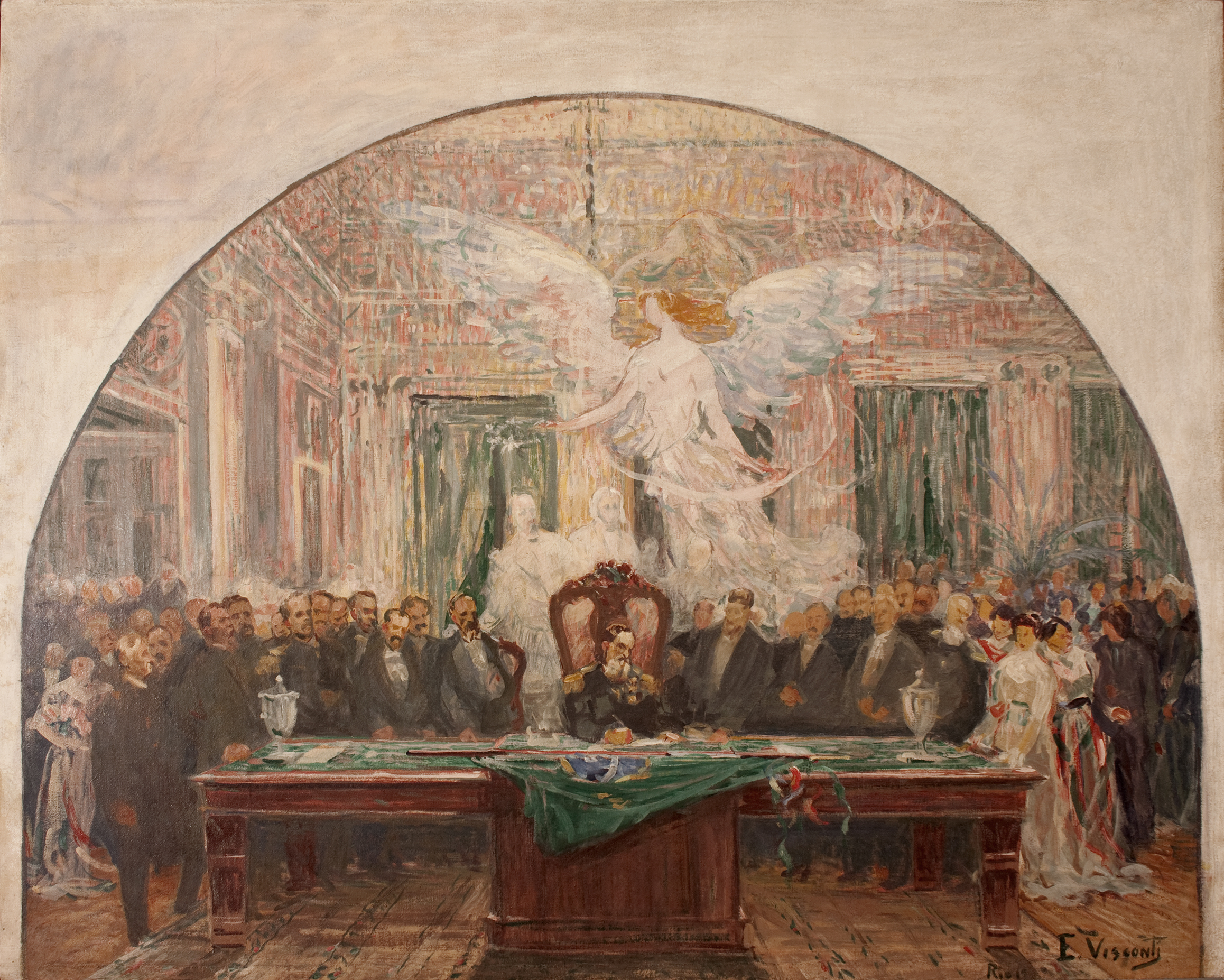
Mural by Eliseu Visconti

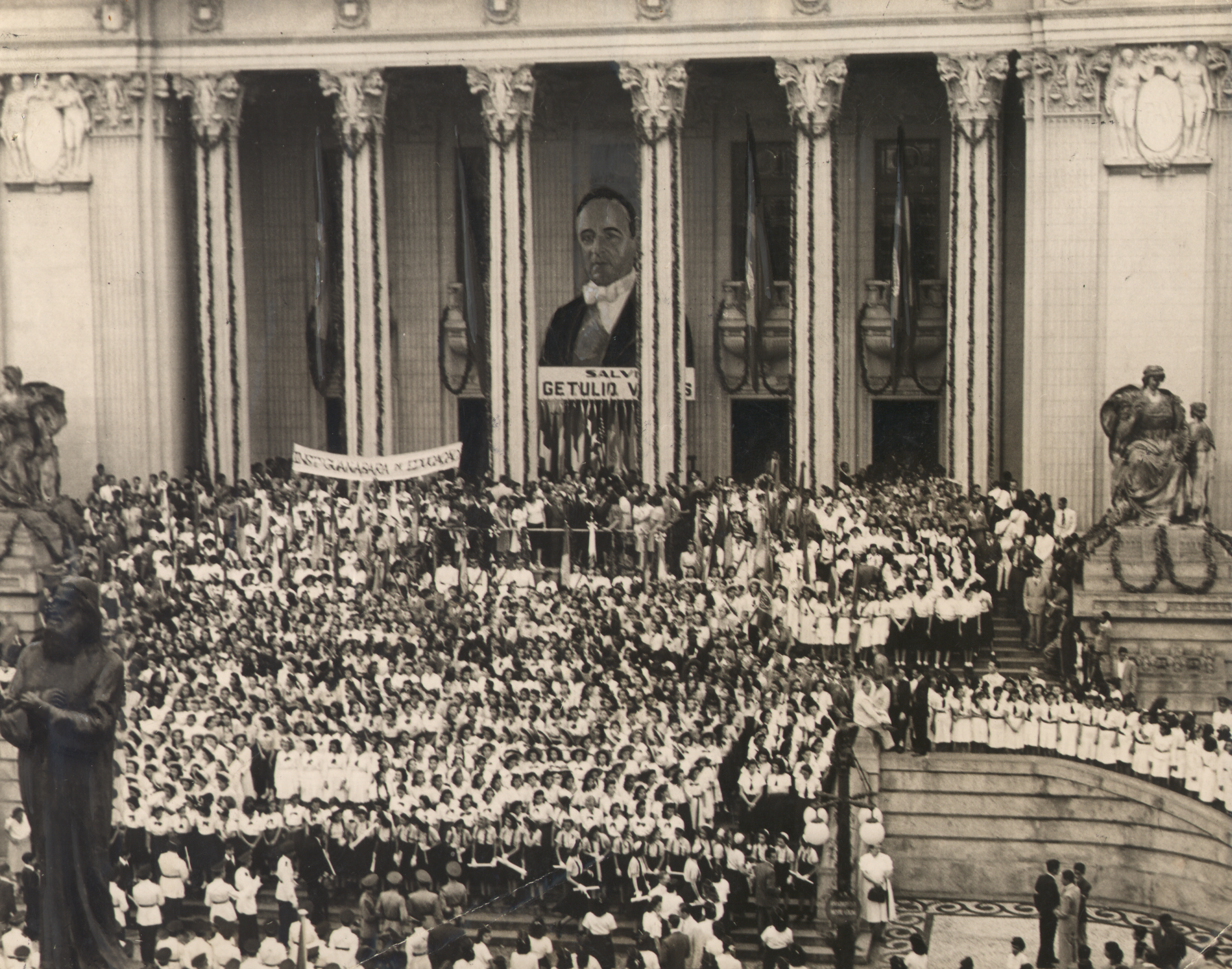
Demonstration in favor of Getúlio Vargas, 1942

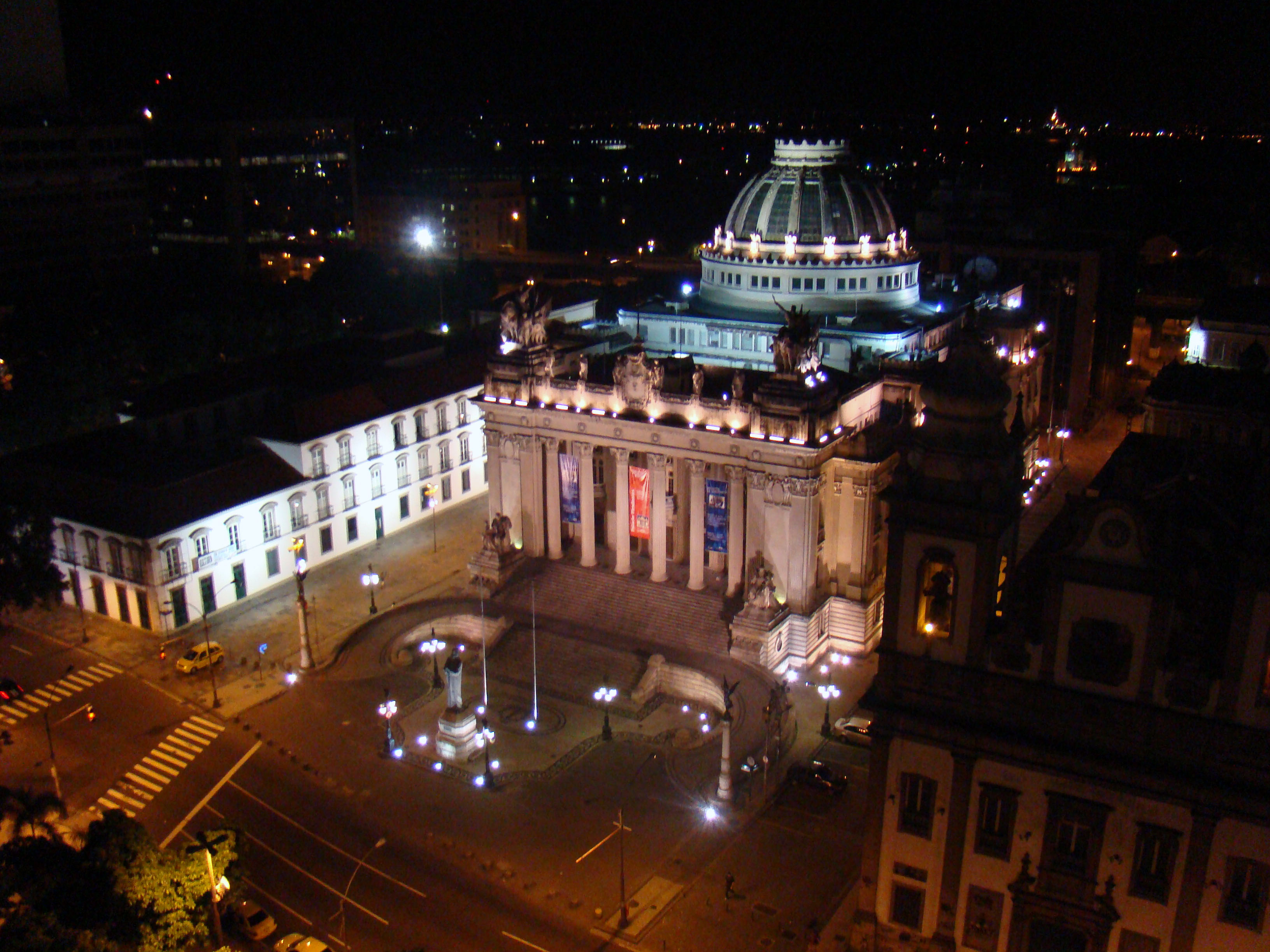
At night

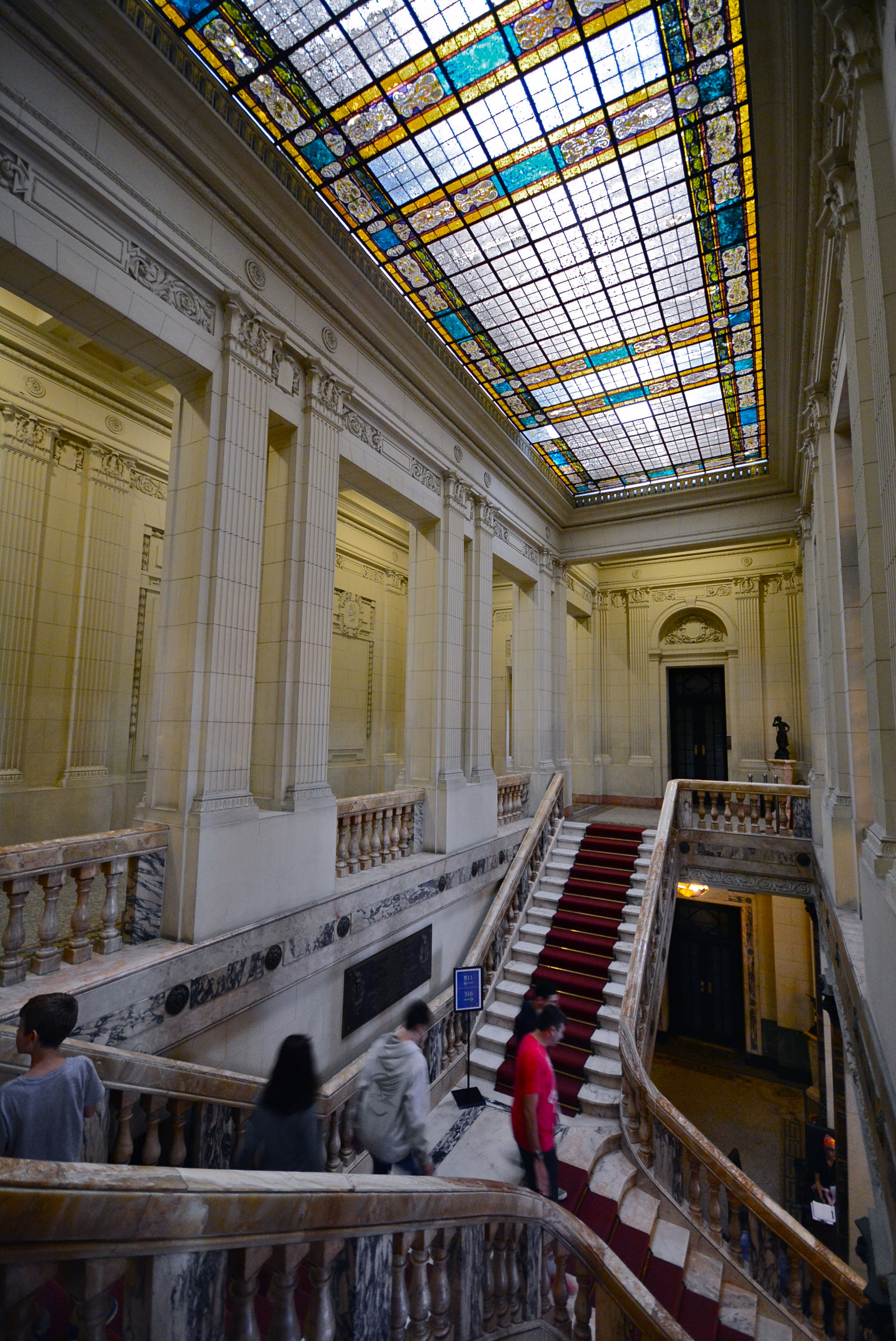
Staircase

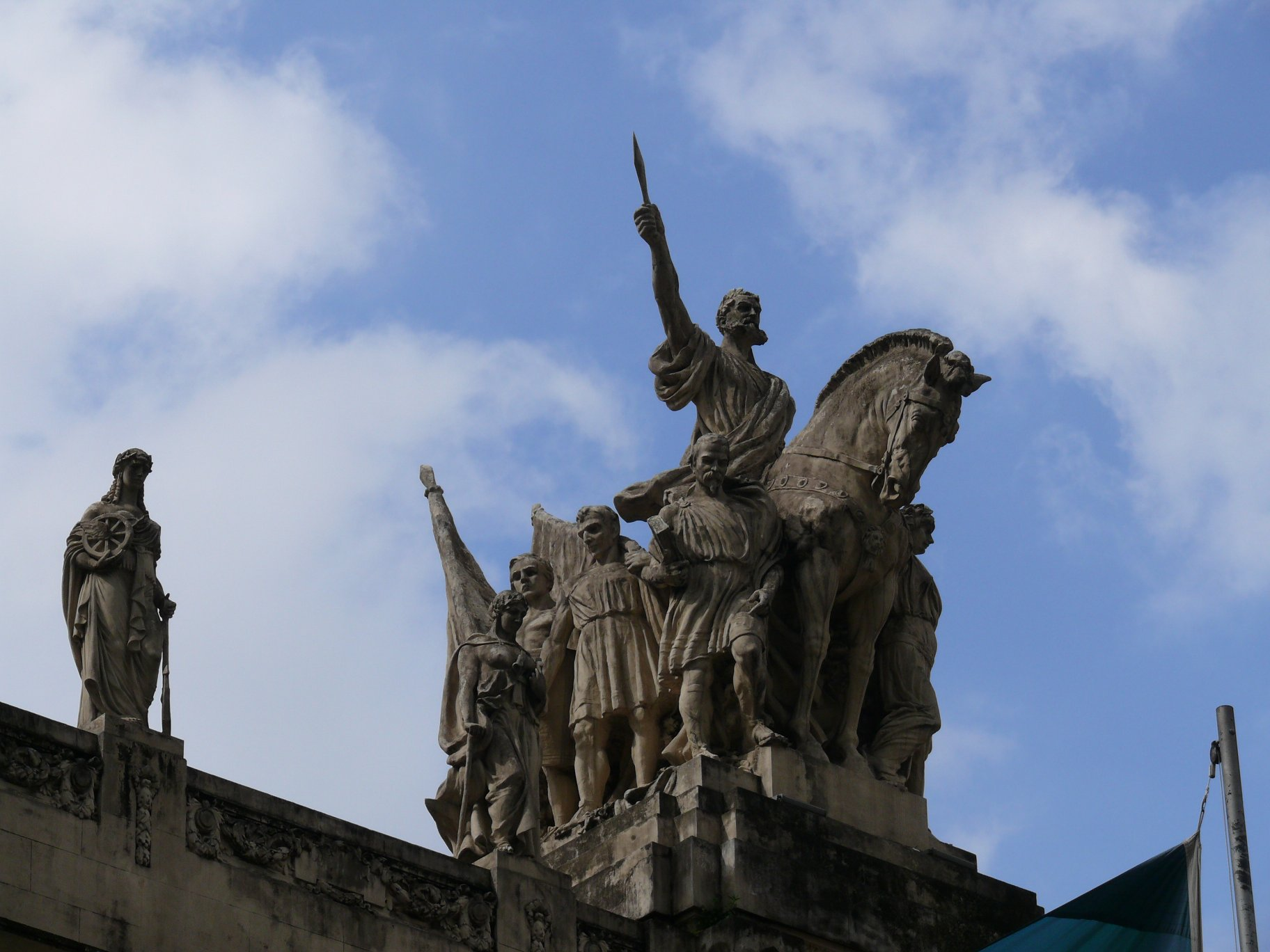
Ornament statues

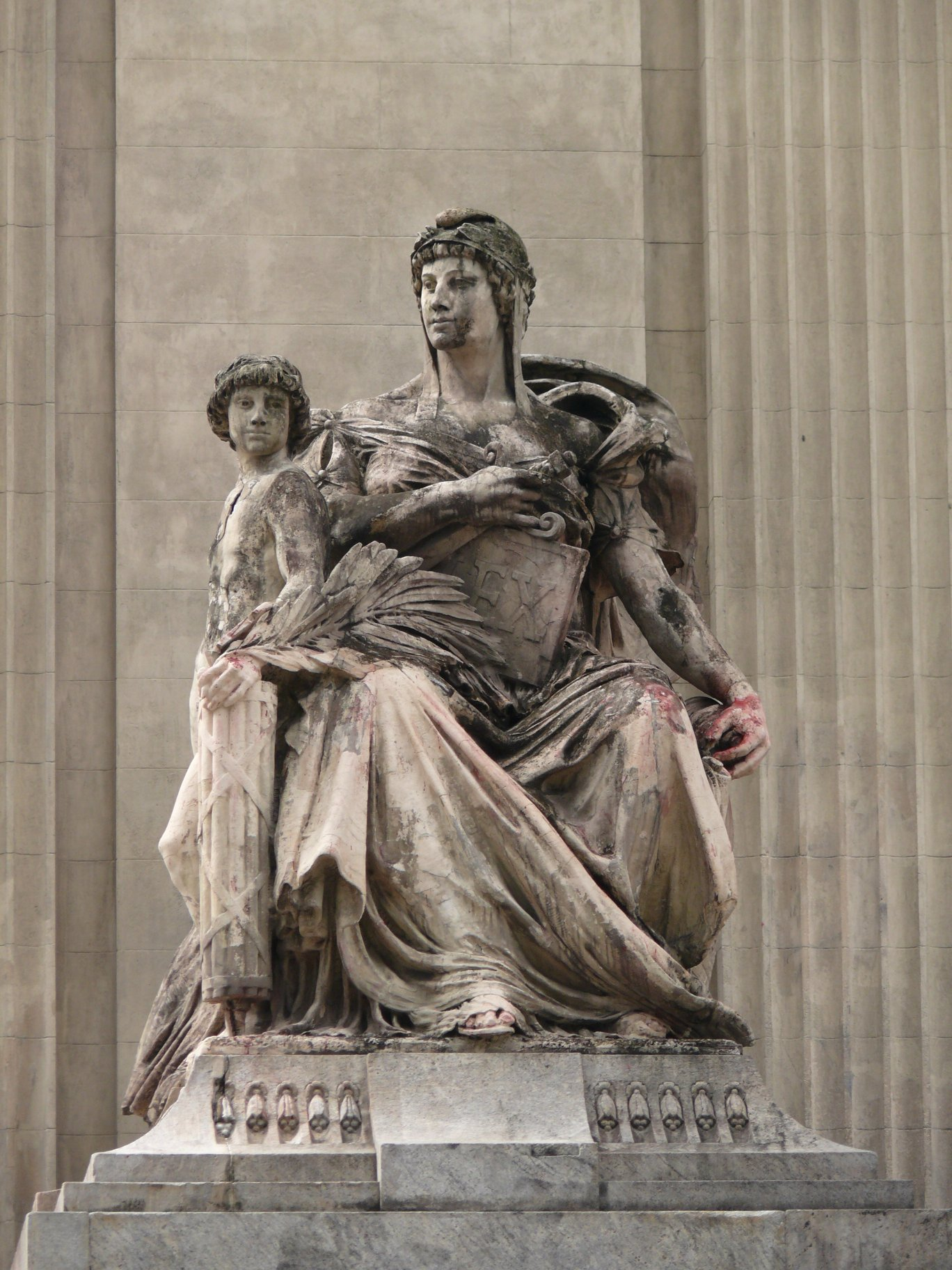
Ornament statue

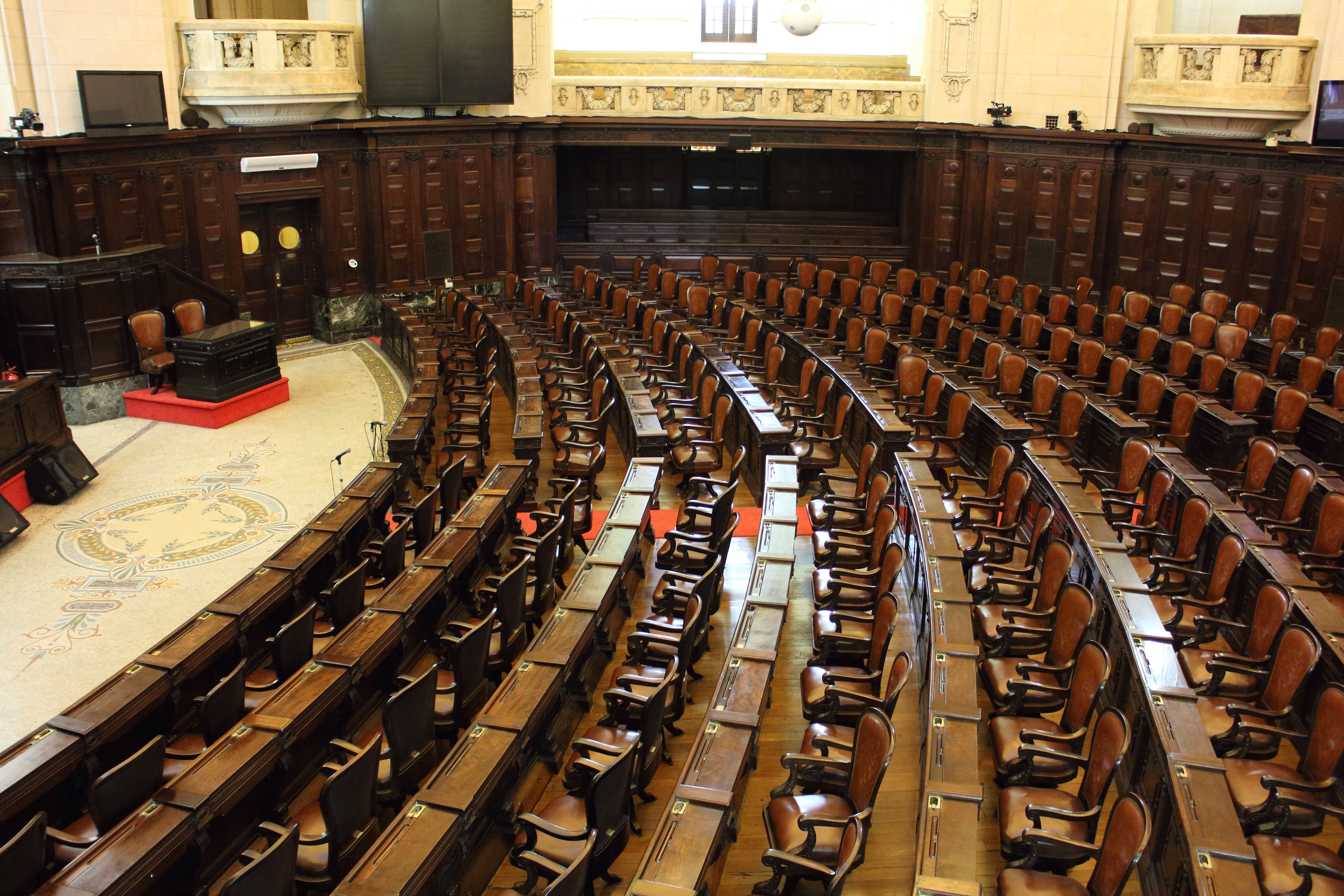
Interior

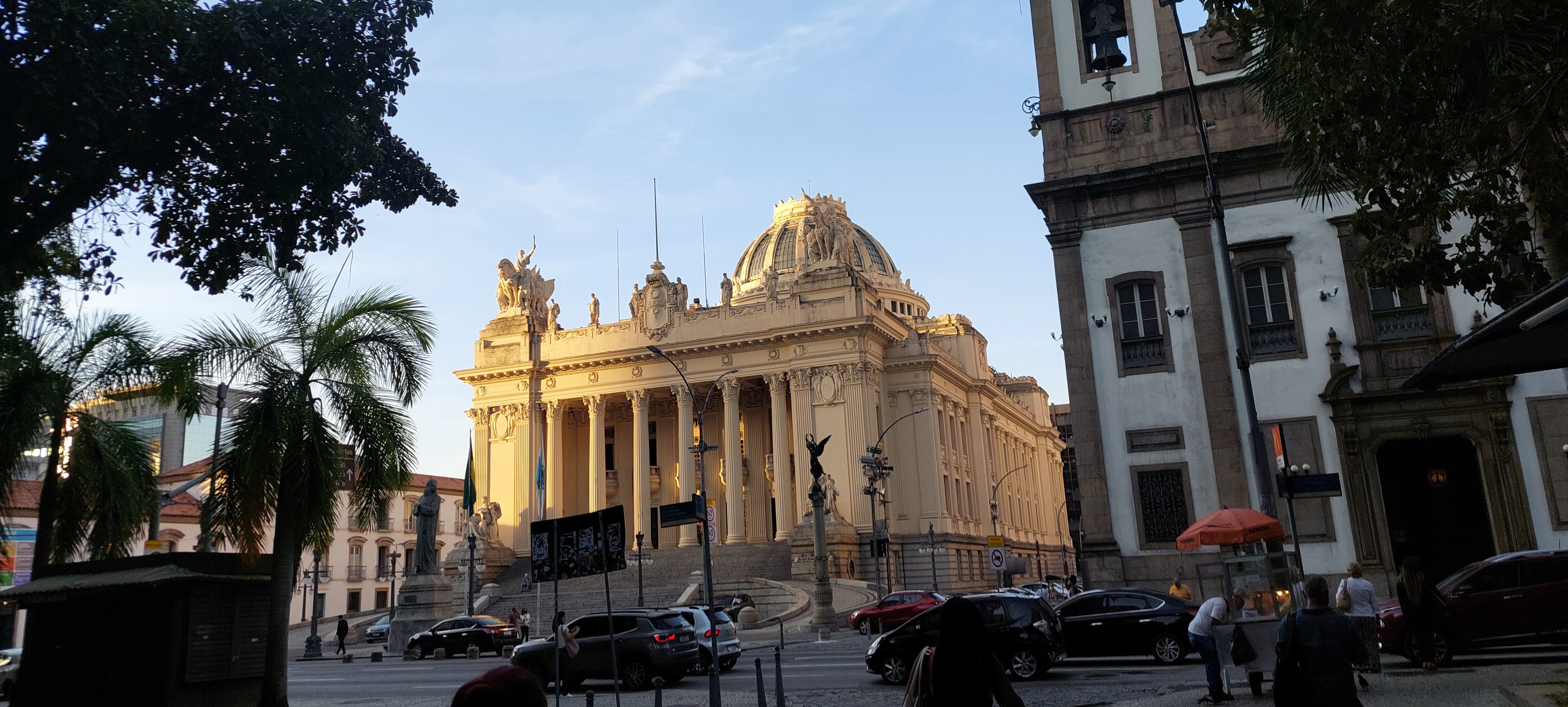
Surroundings

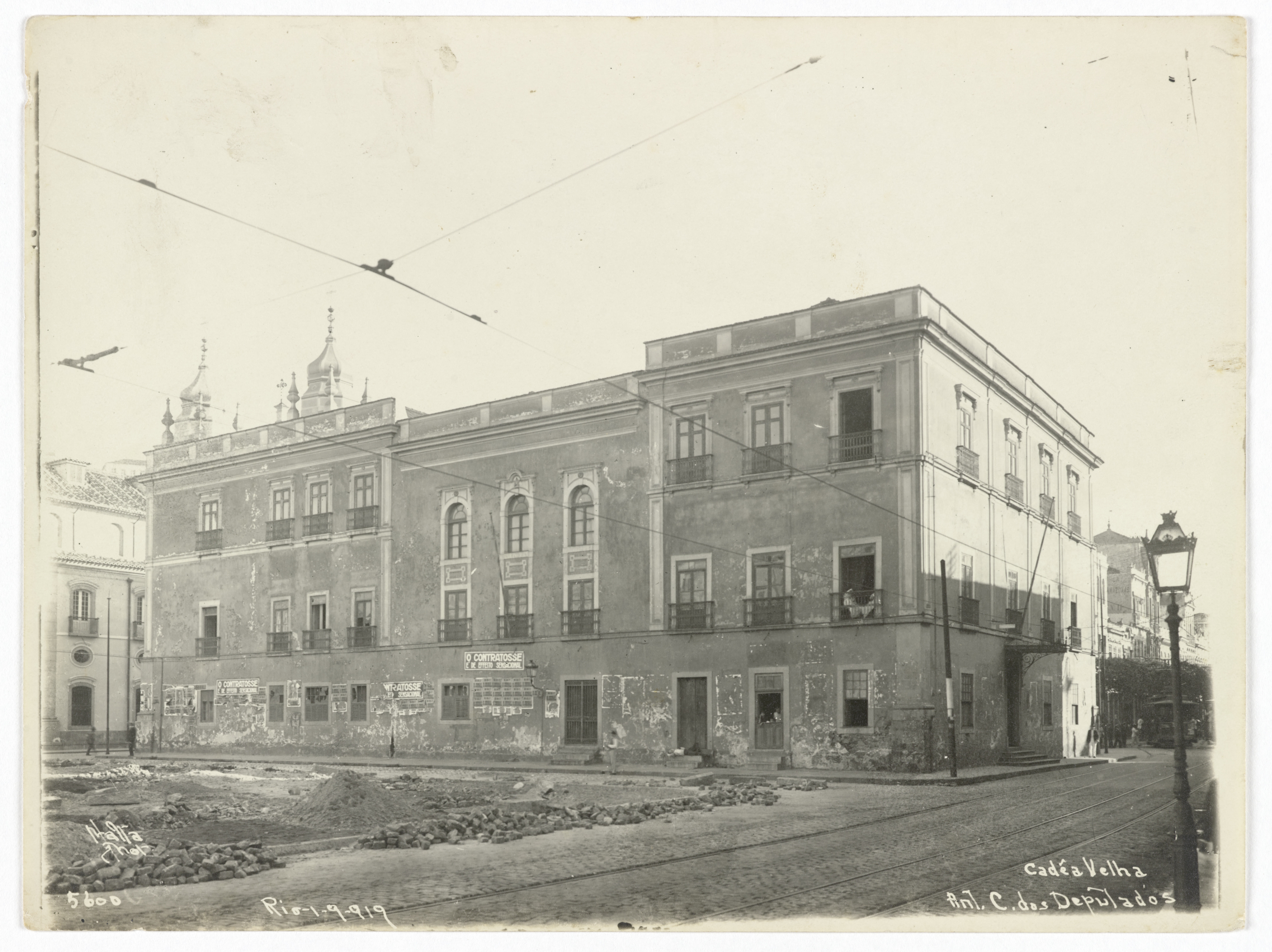
The old building, or Cadeia Velha, demolished in 1922

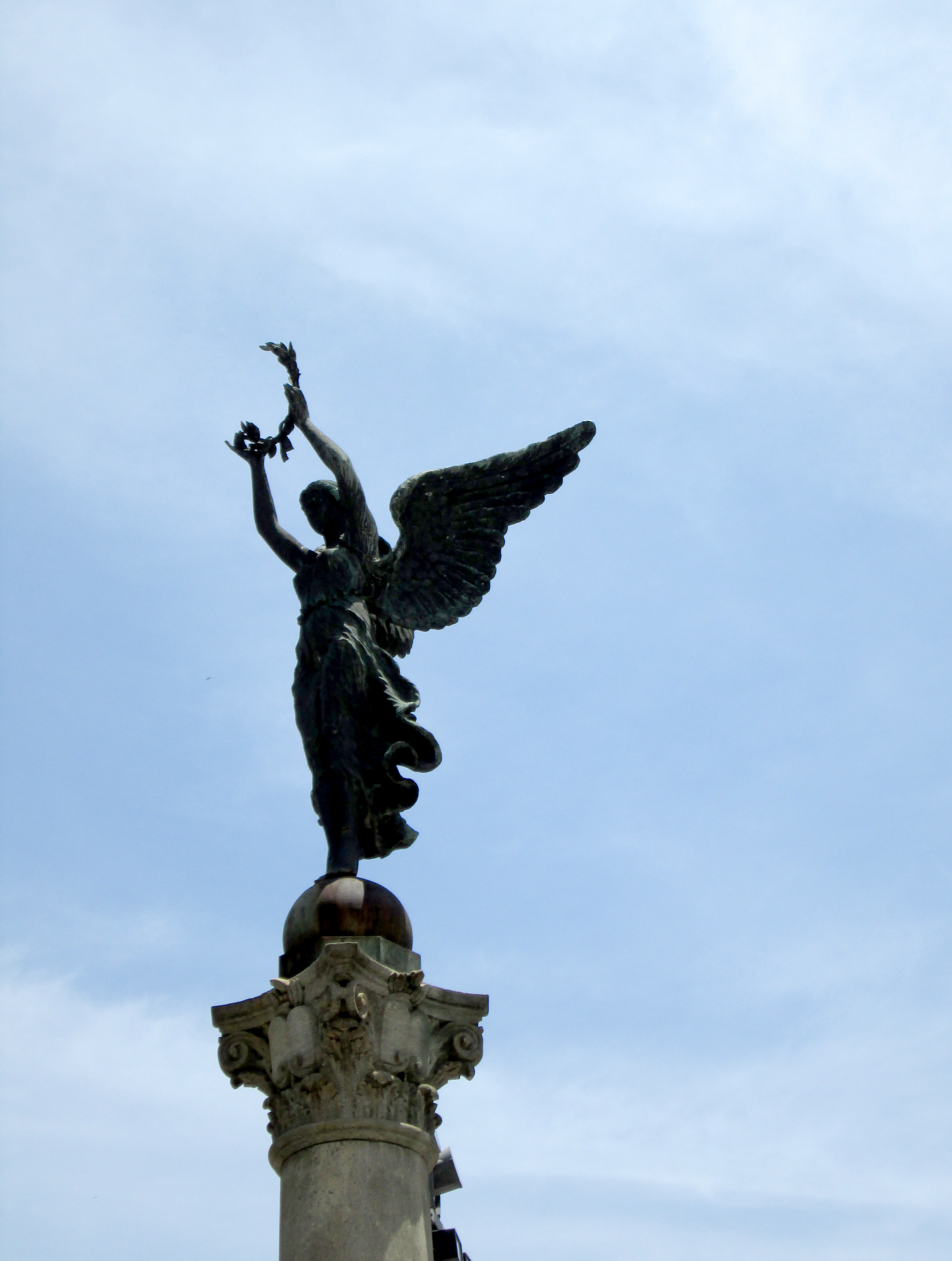
Statue in front of the Tiradentes Palace
