= Cocotá =

- Neighborhood
- Location in Rio de Janeiro Cocotá (Brazil)
- Coordinates: 22°48′18″S 43°10′58″W
- Country: Brazil
- State: Rio de Janeiro (RJ)
- Municipality/City: Rio de Janeiro
- Zone: North Zone

Cocotá is a neighborhood in the North Zone of Rio de Janeiro, Brazil.
