= Lona Cultural =

Theatres in Rio de Janeiro

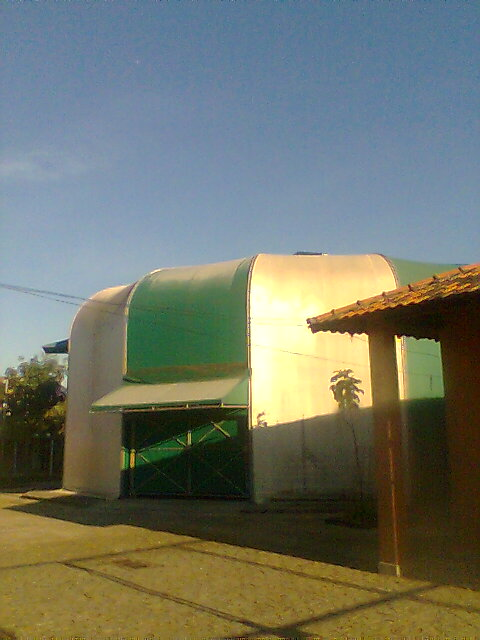
Lona Cultural Sandra de Sá

Lona Cultural is the common name of a series of covered arena theaters in Rio de Janeiro, Brazil, administered by the city's Municipal Secretary of Culture. The theatres serve as venues for cultural activities such as concerts, plays, workshops, art and craft fairs, and courses.
